= Francis McLean (British Army officer) =

British Army officer

Brigadier-General Francis McLean
- Born: c. 1717
- Died: 4 May 1781; Halifax, Nova Scotia

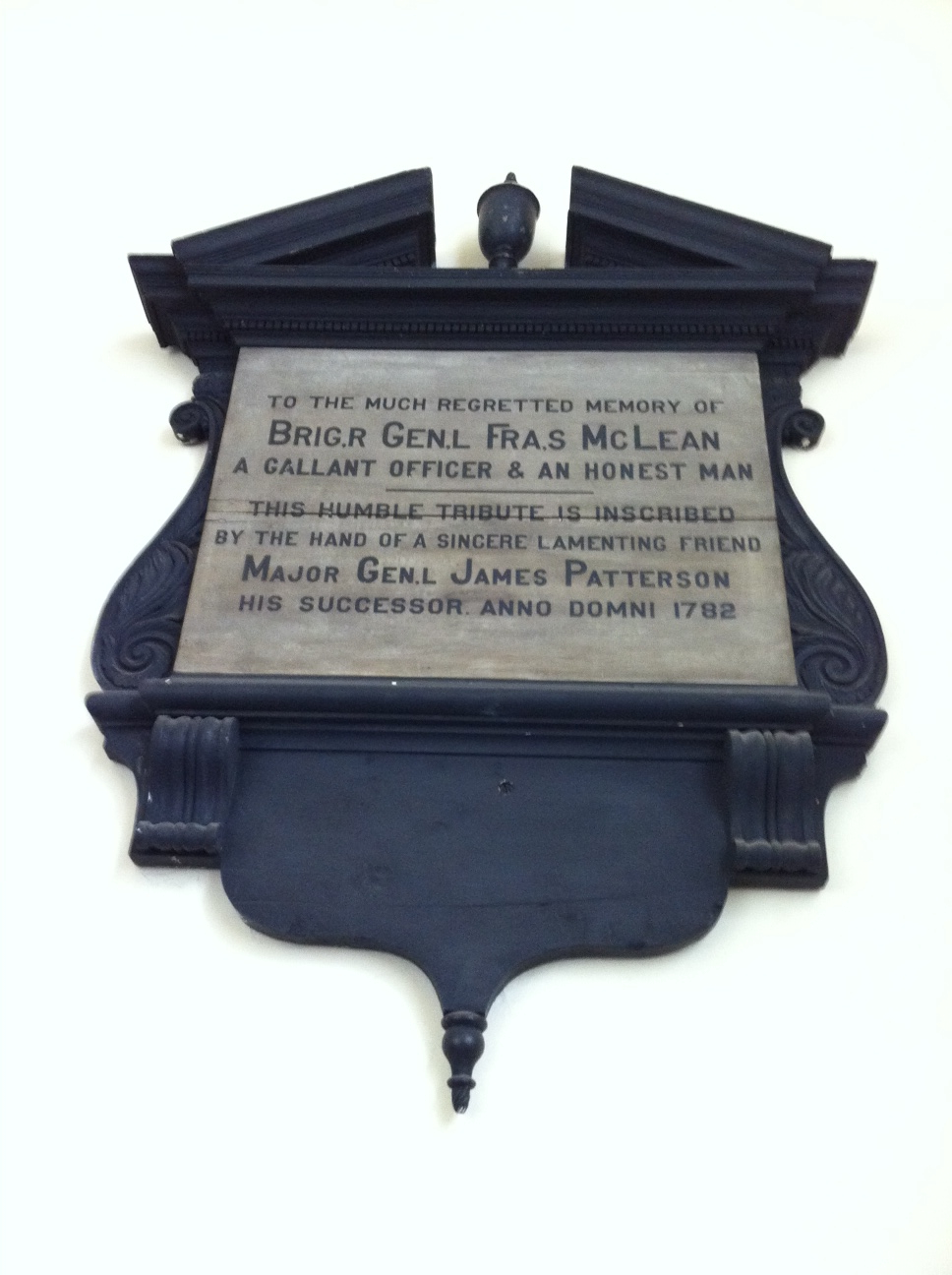
Francis McLean Plaque, St. Paul's Church (Halifax), Nova Scotia

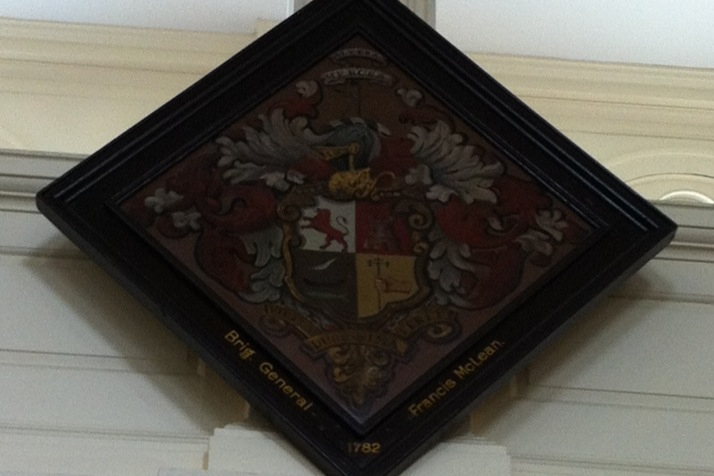
Francis McLean's hatchment, St Pauls Church, Halifax, Nova Scotia

Brigadier-General Francis McLean (c. 1717 – 4 May 1781) was a British Army officer. One of two sons of Captain William Maclean and Anne Kinloch, he became famous for defending New Ireland against the Penobscot Expedition during the American Revolutionary War. The defeat of the Expedition was a crushing British victory. He was in command of the 74th Regiment of Foot and 82nd Regiment of Foot. He died 4 May 1781 at Halifax, Nova Scotia and is buried in the crypt of St. Paul's Church. McLean never married.

== War of the Austrian Succession ==
During the War of the Austrian Succession, Francis McLean served with his more famous kinsman Allan Maclean of Torloisk in the Scots Brigade in the Dutch service and was captured at Bergen op Zoom in 1747, where Maréchal Löwendal, the French commander, praised him for his bravery. In October 1758 McLean joined the British army as a captain in the 2nd battalion, 42nd Foot, and was wounded in the capture of Guadeloupe in 1759. He exchanged into the 97th Foot in 1761, became lieutenant-colonel in 1762. From 1762 to 1778 he was in the Portuguese service, attaining the rank of major-general and appointment to the government of Lisbon. At the same time he dabbled in real estate in North America. He acquired a lot on St John's (Prince Edward) Island and in 1773 was among several petitioners for 250,000 acres in upper New York.

== American Revolution ==
In 1777 the 82nd Foot was raised for service in the North American British colonies and Francis McLean was its lieutenant-colonel. He sailed with the regiment for Nova Scotia in spring 1778 and arrived in September. He replaced Major-General Eyre Massey as military commander at Halifax and was appointed to the local rank of brigadier in Nova Scotia by Sir Henry Clinton, the commander-in-chief in North America. McLean was also responsible to Clinton for overseeing Indian affairs and looking after arriving loyalists.

=== Penobscot Expedition ===
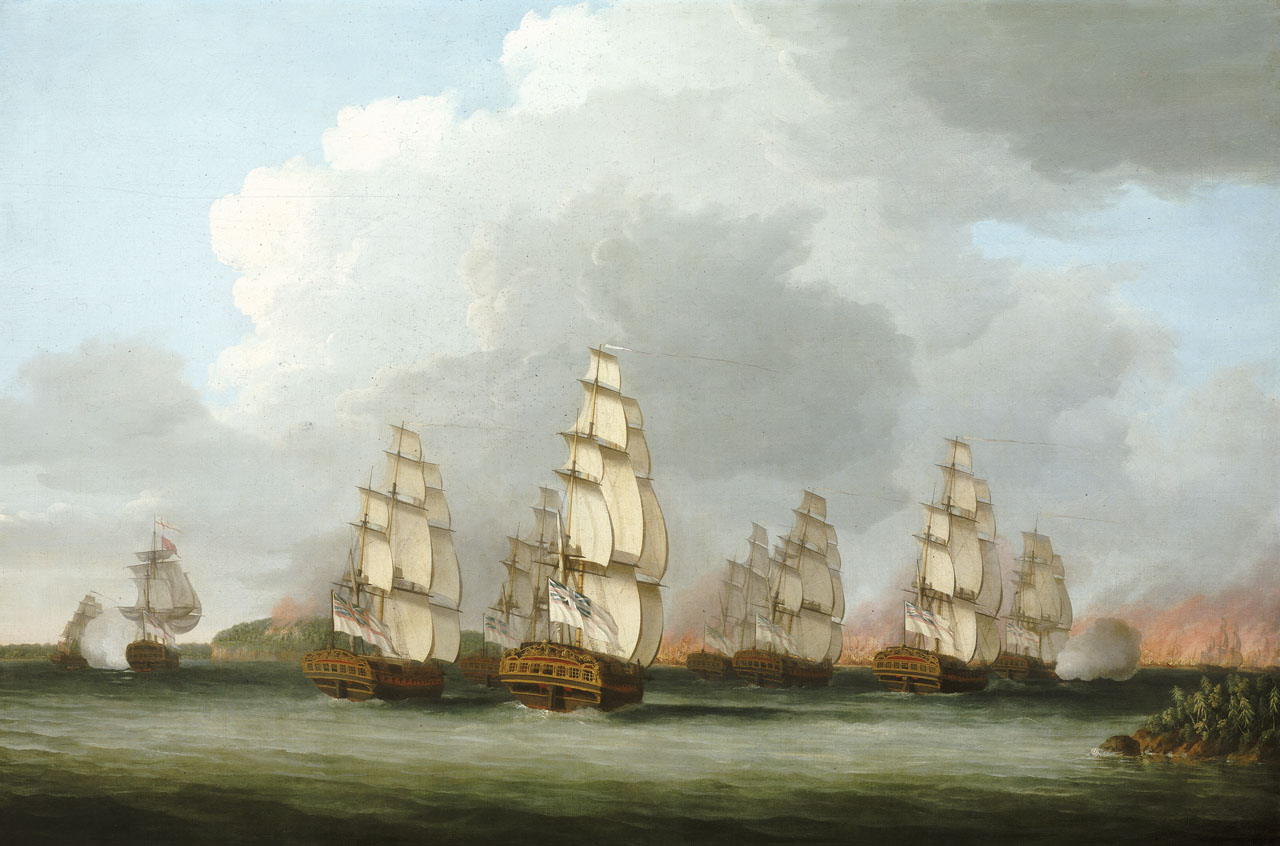
Destruction of the American Fleet at Penobscot Bay by Dominic Serres. Britain defending New Ireland from the Penobscot Expedition during the American Revolution

On 16 June 1779, under Clinton's orders, McLean took an expedition of about 650 men and several ships to Fort Majebigwaduce at Castine to find a refuge for loyalists and to forestall an anticipated attack on Nova Scotia by troops from New England. From 25 July an American force of between 2,000 and 3,000 soldiers and sailors in some 40 vessels under the command of Solomon Lovell and Dudley Saltonstall besieged him there. McLean faced desperate odds and prepared to surrender his forces after putting up a respectable fight. His fortifications, especially the newly established Fort George, were under construction and weak. The American commanders disagreed on how the siege should proceed and many of their ground troops were too inexperienced to follow up on small tactical victories. McLean resolved to stand his ground when the American forces failed to attack the British fleet or Fort George and he sent for help. A gale drove back one relief force from Halifax, but Sir George Collier sailed from Sandy Hook, New Jersey on 3 August and engaged the Americans on the 14th, routing them completely. This defeat was one of the most embarrassing American defeats of the war; they retreated up the Penobscot and burned most of their fleet to prevent capture. McLean's casualties were light. He returned to Halifax in the late fall.

McLean was viewed by his contemporaries as a brave and resolute soldier. John Moore, later a famous general, served as a subaltern under him at Majebigwaduce.

As an administrator, some found McLean controversial. Superintendent of Indian Affairs Michael Francklin stated that in 1781 McLean refused to release trade goods to him without explicit instructions from Clinton. However, until the fall of 1779 the government had allowed Francklin to draw all provisions from military stores, but in 1780 he was required to obtain the permission of the commander-in-chief. Another contemporary, the Reverend Jacob Bailey, asserted that McLean arbitrarily took rations away from 200 or 300 loyalist refugees, allowing them to only about 20 people. But Clinton checked McLean's expenditures on loyalists closely and at the same time approved heartily some of McLean's administrative arrangements, such as the establishment of regimental hospitals.

McLean grew visibly ill during the winter of 1780–81, and died on 4 May 1781 at Halifax, where he was buried two days later.

== See also ==
- Nova Scotia in the American Revolution
- Military history of Nova Scotia
- Benjamin Milliken
