= 74th Regiment of (Highland) Foot =

British infantry regiment in the American Revolutionary War

The 74th Regiment of (Highland) Foot or 74th Regiment of Foot (Argylshire Highlanders) was a British Army line infantry regiment from 1777 to 1784 which was raised to fight in the American Revolutionary War.

== History ==
In December 1777, John Campbell of Barbreck received letters of service from King George III to raise a regiment of infantry in the county of Argyll for service in the regular army. Campbell had held a commission in the old 78th, or Fraser's Highlanders during the French and Indian War. Most regimental officers were commissioned in 1777, but the first muster of the regiment was not held until April 1778. It was inspected at Glasgow in May 1778 and sailed for Halifax, Nova Scotia, in August 1778.

The regiment's flank companies (the grenadier and light infantry companies) joined the main British army in New York in the spring of 1779, while the remainder of the regiment moved to Bagaduce in Massachusetts (now the town of Castine, Maine) to establish the colony New Ireland. The regiment, together with a detachment of the 82nd Regiment of Foot, began construction of a post to be called Fort George, which they held through July and early August against attacks by an American expeditionary force from Massachusetts under Commodore Dudley Saltonstall and General Solomon Lovell. On 13 August, a relief force of British ships arrived from New York under the command of Commodore Sir George Collier, and the Americans gave up their siege and withdrew.

The regiment remained at Fort George until January 1784, when the fort was evacuated and the troops returned to Halifax. There they were reunited with the regiment's flank companies; these had served with General Sir Henry Clinton in South Carolina in 1779 and 1780. The Light Company had also served in Virginia in 1781, ending as part of Lord Cornwallis' army that had surrendered at Yorktown in October 1781 and remaining as prisoners until the end of the war in 1783, when they had returned to New York. The regiment, now complete, returned to Great Britain in 1784, landing at Portsmouth and marching from there to Stirling, where it was disbanded on 24 May 1784.

A set of bagpipes, believed to have been played at the mustering of the regiment in 1778 by one Piper MacCorquodale are in the collection of the National Museums of Scotland.

After the war, many of the soldiers settled in St. Andrews, New Brunswick.
