= Peleg Wadsworth =

American politician

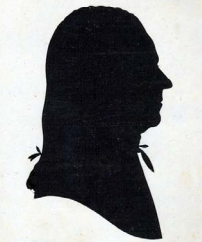

Member of the U.S. House of Representatives from Massachusetts
- In office March 4, 1793 – March 3, 1807 Serving with Henry Dearborn and George Thatcher (4th District-GT)
- Preceded by: Theodore Sedgwick
- Succeeded by: Daniel Ilsley
- Constituency: 4th district (1793–95); 13th district (1795–1803); 15th district (1803–07)

Personal details
- Born: May 6, 1748 Duxbury, Massachusetts, British America
- Died: November 12, 1829 (aged 81) Hiram, Maine, U.S.
- Party: Federalist
- Relations: Henry Wadsworth Longfellow (grandson)
- Children: at least ten, including Zilpha Wadsworth, Henry Wadsworth, Alexander Scammel Wadsworth
- Education: Harvard College
- Occupation: Merchant

Military service
- Allegiance: Massachusetts; United States
- Branch/service: Massachusetts Militia; Continental Army
- Rank: Brigadier general
- Battles/wars: American Revolutionary War; Battle of Long Island; Penobscot Expedition

Peleg Wadsworth (May 6, 1748 – November 12, 1829) was an American Patriot officer during the American Revolutionary War and a Congressman from Massachusetts representing the District of Maine. He was also grandfather of American poet Henry Wadsworth Longfellow.

== Early life ==
Wadsworth was born in Duxbury in the Province of Massachusetts Bay (now Duxbury, Massachusetts) to Peleg and Susanna (Sampson) Wadsworth. He graduated from Harvard College with an A.B. (1769) and an A.M. (1772), and taught school for several years in Plymouth, Massachusetts, with his former classmate Alexander Scammel. There he met Elizabeth Bartlett (1753 – 1825), whom he married in 1772.

== American Revolutionary War ==
The Wadsworths lived in Kingston, until 1775, when Wadsworth recruited a company of minutemen, of which he was chosen captain. His company mustered in response to the alarms generated by the Battle of Lexington and Concord on April 19, 1775. He was fifth in descendant to Christopher Wadsworth, who came from England to the Americas in 1632. The Plymouth County battalion, commanded by Col. Theophilus Cotton marched to Marshfield to attack a garrison of British troops there. The attack was delayed for two days, allowing the British time to escape Marshfield by sea. During that time, Capt. Wadsworth, frustrated with the delay, advanced his company to within firing range of the British encampment, nearly instigating combat.

Wadsworth served as aide to Gen. Artemas Ward in March 1776, and as an engineer under Gen. John Thomas in 1776, assisting in laying out the defenses of Roxbury, Massachusetts. He was present at the Battle of Long Island on August 1, 1776. He was made brigadier general of militia in 1777 and Adjutant General of Massachusetts in 1778.

Wadsworth's finest military engagement was in one of the worst American military defeats of the war. In the summer of 1779 he served as second in command to General Solomon Lovell over the land forces sent to make a combined arms attack on Fort George at Castine, in the so-called Penobscot Expedition. Commodore Dudley Saltonstall was in command of the naval forces. Lt. Colonel Paul Revere also served in this expedition as commander of artillery. While General Lovell remained aboard the Commodore's vessel, Wadsworth and Revere landed with the infantry and artillery and laid siege to the fort for about two weeks. Due to the reluctance of the Commodore to launch a naval attack in support of the ground forces, the British garrison held out until ships of the Royal Navy arrived from New York City and drove the American Navy up the Penobscot River where all 43 American warships were sunk or were scuttled and burned, comprising most of the American fleet, making it the worst American naval disaster prior to the Japanese attack on Pearl Harbor in 1941. Wadsworth, still with the forces on shore, organized and led a successful overland retreat through the Maine frontier. Colonel Revere and Commodore Saltonstall were court-martialed for their roles in the debacle (Revere was acquitted, Saltonstall was "dismissed the service").

In March 1780, Wadsworth was given command of all the troops raised for the defense of the Province of Maine. On February 17, 1781, a party of 25 Loyalists overran his headquarters in Thomaston; this was in revenge for Wadsworth ordering the court-martial and execution of a guide who had assisted Loyalists traveling from Falmouth (now Portland) to Fort George. Wadsworth was captured and imprisoned in Fort George at Bagaduce (Castine) (the same fort he had led the attack against in the summer of 1779), but he and fellow prisoner Maj. Benjamin Burton eventually escaped on June 15, 1781 by cutting a hole in the ceiling of their jail and crawling out along the joists. Wadsworth then returned to his family in Plymouth, where he remained until the war's end.

== After war years ==
In April 1784 Wadsworth returned to Maine, purchased 1.5 acres (6,000 m^{2}) of land on Back Street (now Congress Street in Portland), engaged in surveying, and opened a store in early 1785. There he also built a house, now the historic Wadsworth-Longfellow House. He headed the committee that organized the first convention to discuss independence for Maine from Massachusetts, held in January 1786. He and his wife had eleven children: Alexander Scammell (9 May 1774 – 28 August 1775); Charles Lee (26 January 1776 – 29 September 1848); Zilpah (6 January 1778 – 12 March 1851); Elizabeth (21 September 1779 – 1 August 1802); John (1 September 1781 – 22 January 1860); Lucia (12 June 1783 – 17 October 1864); Henry (21 June 1785 – 4 September 1804); George (6 January 1788 – 8 April 1816); Alexander Scammell (7 May 1790 – 5 April 1851); Samuel Bartlett (1 September 1791 – 2 October 1874); and Peleg (10 October 1793 – 17 January 1875). Zilpah became the mother of poet Henry Wadsworth Longfellow. Although Wadsworth continued to live in Portland, in 1790 he purchased 7,800 acres (30 km^{2}) from the Commonwealth in what became the town of Hiram, settled his son Charles there in 1795, and also in 1795 began building Wadsworth Hall for his retirement.

In 1792 Wadsworth was chosen a presidential elector and a member of the Massachusetts Senate, and from 1793 to 1807 was the first representative in Congress from the region of Massachusetts that later became Maine. In January 1807 he moved to Hiram where he incorporated the township (February 27, 1807) and served as selectman, treasurer and magistrate. For the remainder of his life he devoted himself to farming and local concerns. He died in Hiram on November 12, 1829, and is buried in the family cemetery at Wadsworth Hall.

== Legacy ==
Wadsworth's Portland house was declared a National Historic Landmark for its association with him and with his grandson, poet Henry Wadsworth Longfellow. The house at Portland was gifted to the Maine Historical Society by his granddaughter Anne Longfellow Pierce upon her death in 1901. She was the last family member to live in the home. Wadsworth Hall, Peleg Wadsworth's home in Hiram, is also listed on the National Register of Historic Places.

U.S. House of Representatives
Preceded by Theodore Sedgwick (Redistricted)	Member of the U.S. House of Representatives from Massachusetts's 4th congressional district (Maine district); March 4, 1793 – March 3, 1795 alongside: George Thatcher, Henry Dearborn on a General ticket	Succeeded by Dwight Foster (Redistricted)
Preceded by New position	Member of the U.S. House of Representatives from Massachusetts's 13th congressional district (Maine district); 1795–1803	Succeeded by Ebenezer Seaver
Preceded by New position	Member of the U.S. House of Representatives from Massachusetts's 15th congressional district (Maine district); 1803–1807	Succeeded by Daniel Ilsley
