= HMS Diligent (1777) =

Brig of the Royal Navy

History

Great Britain
- Name: HMS Diligent
- Builder: America
- Acquired: 1777 by purchase
- Captured: 7 May 1779

- Name: USS Diligent
- Acquired: By capture May 1779
- Fate: Scuttled August 1779

General characteristics
- Type: Brig
- Tons burthen: 236 (bm)
- Length: 88 ft 5 3/4 in (27.0 m) (deck)
- Beam: 24 ft 8 in (7.5 m)
- Depth of hold: 10 ft 10 in (3.3 m)
- Complement: HMS:45; USS: 50
- Armament: HMS: 10 × 3-pounder guns; USS: 14 × 4-pounder guns

HMS Diligent was a 12-gun brig-sloop of the Royal Navy purchased in 1777. The Continental Navy captured her in May 1779 and took her into service as the 14-gun brig USS Diligent. She then participated in the disastrous Penobscot Expedition where her crew had to scuttle her in August to prevent her capture.

== HMS Diligent ==
The Royal Navy commissioned Diligent under Lieutenant Thomas Farnham in August 1777. The Navy then purchased her on 25 October 1777 for £420 4s 0d.

Lieutenant Thomas Walbeoff was appointed in January 1778 to replace Farnham. In May, Walbeoff took commanded of York, which the French captured on 19 July.

Farnham was in command of Diligent on 26 April when at about 4p.m. she fired two shots at an American schooner near Matinecoock Point, Long Island, and chased her into a creek that was too shallow for Diligent to enter. After firing another 60 shots, Farnham sent in his boats, but they were unable to retrieve the schooner. Diligent then sailed at 7p.m. and by 9p.m. had anchored at Hempstead, New York.

The next day, Diligent sent two boats in to cut off some American whaleboats that had landed at Loyds Neck. Cerberus and Raven also sent in boats. However, an American galley fired on the boats, which withdrew.

On 6 May Farnham sent his boats to intercept an American boat. The British boats returned after they had destroyed the American boat, whose crew had escaped on shore.

Ten days later, boats from Diligent, Cerberus, and Falcon, together with an un-named tender, cut out a brig from Newfield Harbour.

On 10 June, 1778 3 of her boats captured victualing sloop "Eagle" docked in Scots Cove, Rowayton, Connecticut.

On 21 October 1778, Diligent and Diamond stopped the brig Recovery at 42°17′N 69°00′W. Recovery was sailing from Portsmouth to Charles Town with a cargo of lumber, and her captors sent her into New York.

In February 1779, Diligent was under the command of Lieutenant (eventually Admiral) Thomas Macnamara Russell when she captured four small vessels:

- Brig Lady Washington, of 150 tons, six guns, and 22 men. Her owners were Norton & Co. of Baltimore, and she had been sailing from Lorient to Baltimore with a cargo of tea and other India goods when Diligent stopped her at sea on 11 February and sent her into New York.
- Schooner Dolphin, of 60 tons, two guns, and eight men. Dolphin, of Baltimore, had been sailing from Curacoa to Baltimore with a cargo of gin and dry goods when Diligent stopped her at sea on 20 February and sent her into New York.
- Schooner Polly, of 60 tons and six men. Her owner was D. Rogers of Newbury, and she was sailing from Williamsburg to Boston with flour and tobacco when Diligent stopped her at sea on 20 February and sent her into New York.
- Sloop Ranger, of 15 tons and six men. Her owner was John Donaldson of Philadelphia. She was sailing from Delaware to Eustatia with a cargo of tobacco when Diligent captured her at sea on 25 February and sent her into New York.

These captures took place during a cruise off Chesapeake Bay. Russell stated that Lady Washington was armed with 16 guns and that she fought until Diligent; closed and prepared to board, at which point Lady Washington surrendered. Her crew consisted of Americans and French. Lady Washington was sold for £26,000, of which, as captain, Russell was entitled to two-eighths in prize money.

Some time thereafter, Diligent chased two large enemy brigs of 18 guns each that were escorting a convoy. The two brigs passed Diligent on different tacks, and under British colours. One, which stated that she was the Rose-in-June, Captain Duncan, fired a broadside into Diligent, at which point the other brig also fired a broadside. Both then sailed off. Diligent followed, but lost them in the night. She was able, however, to capture one of the vessels in the convoy that was carrying flour and tobacco. In all, in five weeks Diligent and Russell captured eight ships, inclusive of the four listed above.

Lieutenant Thomas Wabeoff assumed command of Diligent in April 1779, and she was under his command and cruising off the coast of Delaware in May 1779, looking for American privateers. She had captured one American vessel when at daybreak on 7 May Walbeoff sighted a strange sail. He sailed towards the vessel, which turned out to be the Continental Navy's sloop Providence.

The three-hour engagement began with a broadside and volley of small arms fire from Providence. Eventually, Walbeoff struck. Diligent had lost 11 men dead and 19 wounded; Providence had four killed and 10 wounded. The subsequent court martial acquitted Walbeoff, his officers, and men of the loss of Diligent, and praised Walbeoff's conduct.

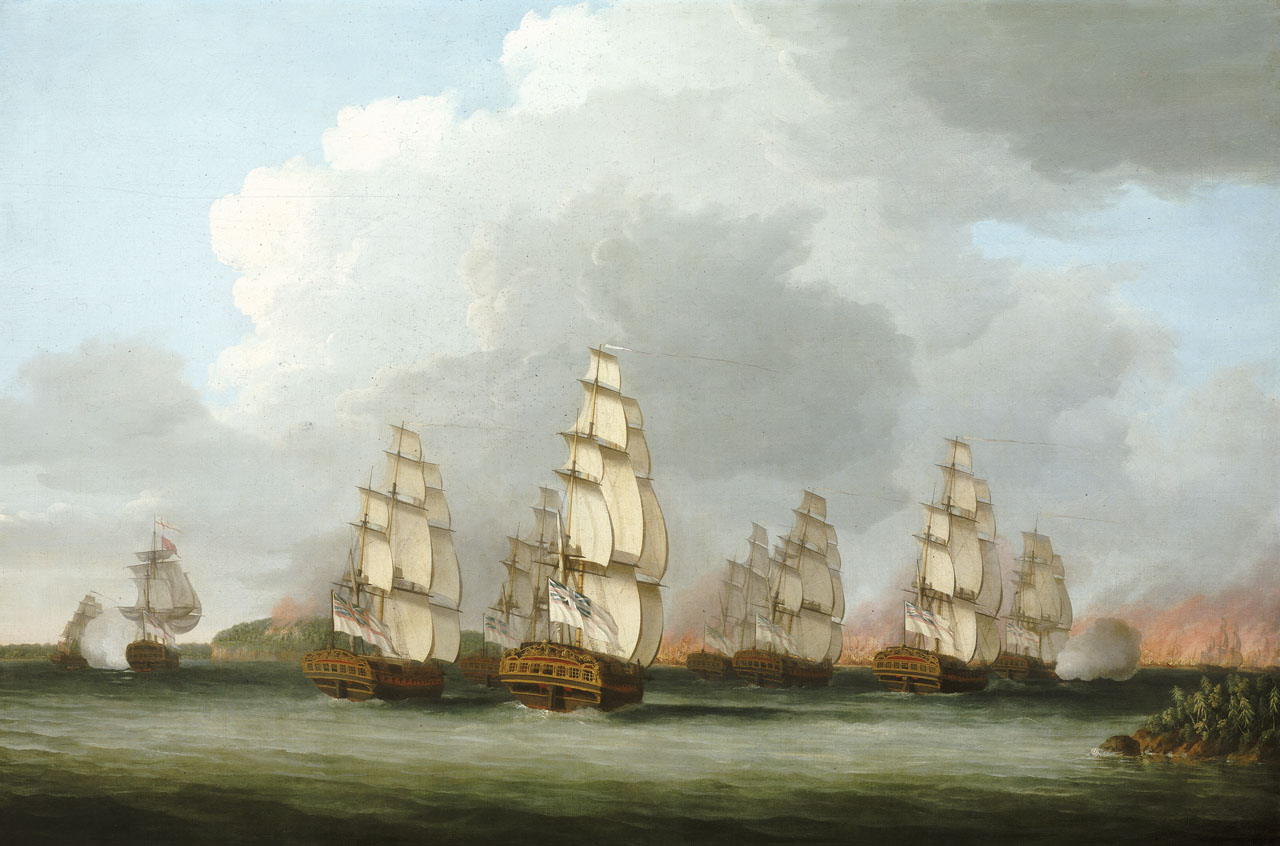
Destruction of the American Fleet at Penobscot Bay by Dominic Serres

== USS Diligent ==
The Continental Navy took Diligent into service, commissioning her under the command of Lieutenant Phillip Brown. Diligent cruised with Providence for a short time.

Diligent and Providence then were assigned to Commodore Dudley Saltonstall’s squadron, which departed Boston on 19 July and entered Penobscot Bay on 25 July. The Americans successfully landed an armed force that attempted to recapture Castine, Maine. The initial British force consisted only of some troops and three sloops. However, a British squadron arrived and the American effort failed completely.

== Fate ==
On 14 August her crew ran Diligent ashore and burnt her to prevent her capture. Providence met the same fate.
