= Fort George (Castine, Maine) =

- U.S. National Register of Historic Places
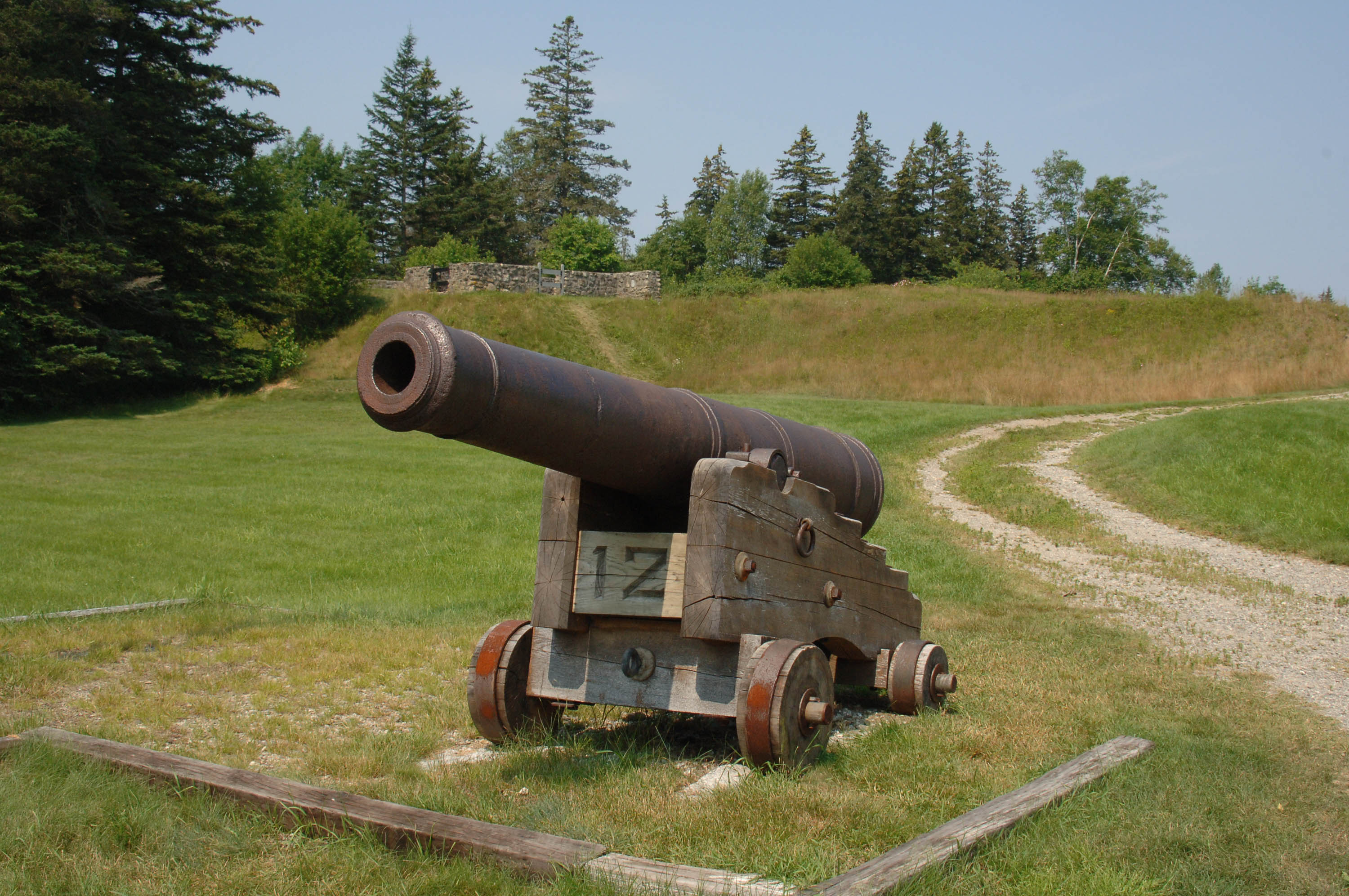
- Fort George - British fort built to defend their colony of New Ireland

- Location within Maine Location within the United States
- Location: Wadsworth St. off Battle Ave., Castine, Maine
- Coordinates: 44°23′27″N 68°48′20″W
- Area: 7 acres (2.8 ha)
- Built: 1779
- NRHP reference No.: 69000007
- Added to NRHP: December 30, 1969

Fort George (also sometimes known as Fort Majabigwaduce, Castine, or Penobscot) was a palisaded earthwork fort built in 1779 by Great Britain during the American Revolutionary War in Castine, Maine. Located at a high point on the Bagaduce Peninsula, the fort was built as part of an initiative by the British to establish a new colony called New Ireland.

The fort was the principal site of the British defense during the Massachusetts-organized Penobscot Expedition, a disastrous attempt in July and August of 1779 to retake Castine in response to the British move. The British re-occupied Castine in the War of 1812 from September 1814 to April 1815, rebuilding Fort George and establishing smaller forts around it, again creating the New Ireland colony. The remains of the fort, now little more than its earthworks, are part of a state-owned and town-maintained park.

== Description ==
Fort George is today a roughly square earthwork, about 200 feet (61 m) on each side, with bastions at the corners that project out an additional 40 feet (12 m). These works are for the most part about 10 feet (3.0 m) in height, although the easternmost bastion is 20 feet (6.1 m) high.

Features of the fort that have not survived include a palisade, moat, and gateway. The fort at one time was surrounded by a 20 feet (6.1 m) wall topped with fraising, and with cheval de frise at the base. Additional defenses included the digging of a canal across much of the neck separating the Bagaduce Peninsula from the rest of the mainland.

Castine is set at a strategically significant location near the head of Penobscot Bay, and was a point of conflict at several times between the 17th and 19th centuries. The fort was one of a series of defenses erected by the British in 1779.

== History ==
Pursuant to plans for establishing a military presence on the coast of Maine as well as the colony of New Ireland, a British force led by General Francis McLean arrived off Castine in June 1779, seized the town, and established Fort George and other fortifications in the area. Massachusetts, of which Maine was then a part, responded by raising a large militia force, which in an operation known as the Penobscot Expedition, disastrously failed in its attempt to dislodge the British in July and August of 1779.

The British established the fort under the command of a general named Campbell. There were about 30 houses in the area. They brought in prizes (captured ships and cargo), and received trade from British-controlled Halifax and New York. Loyalists from the surrounding area flocked to the village. The fort was not abandoned by the British until 1784.

The British re-occupied Castine in the War of 1812 from September 1814 to April 1815, again establishing New Ireland. They rebuilt Fort George, renamed the captured Fort Madison (aka Fort United States) as Fort Castine, and built Forts Furieuse, Gosselin, Griffith, and Sherbrooke. They also refurbished the peninsula's canal defense line. They withdrew after the cessation of hostilities, and following a brief period of American use, the fort was abandoned and demolished in 1819.

The fort was not re-used by the United States until after the War of 1812.

=== Detainment and Escape of Wadsworth and Burton ===
A Loyalist guide led a party, traveling from Falmouth (now Portland) to Fort George. Upon returning to his home in Camden he was captured, court-martialed and executed by the Americans, tried by Major Benjamin Burton under the direction of Brigadier General Peleg Wadsworth.

In revenge for this, a party of 25 Loyalists went to Wadsworth's quarters at Camden and took him prisoner, injuring Wadsworth. Months later, Major Benjamin Burton was captured while in passage from Boston to St. George's River. They were incarcerated at Fort George and meant to be moved to prisons in either Halifax or New York, later to be transported to England.

Wadsworth and Burton escaped on June 15, 1781 by cutting a hole in the roof of their jail. Under cover of a heavy rainstorm, the noise of their escape was drowned out.

== National Historic Place ==
The state of Maine acquired the fort in 1940, and twenty years later provided funds to rebuild a magazine with other improvements. The site of the fort's remains is now a park of 7 acres (2.8 ha), owned by the state and maintained by the town. The site was listed on the National Register of Historic Places in 1969. Fort George is the site of Majabigwaduce, the location for Bernard Cornwell's 2010 book The Fort, which is about the Penobscot Expedition.

== Gallery ==
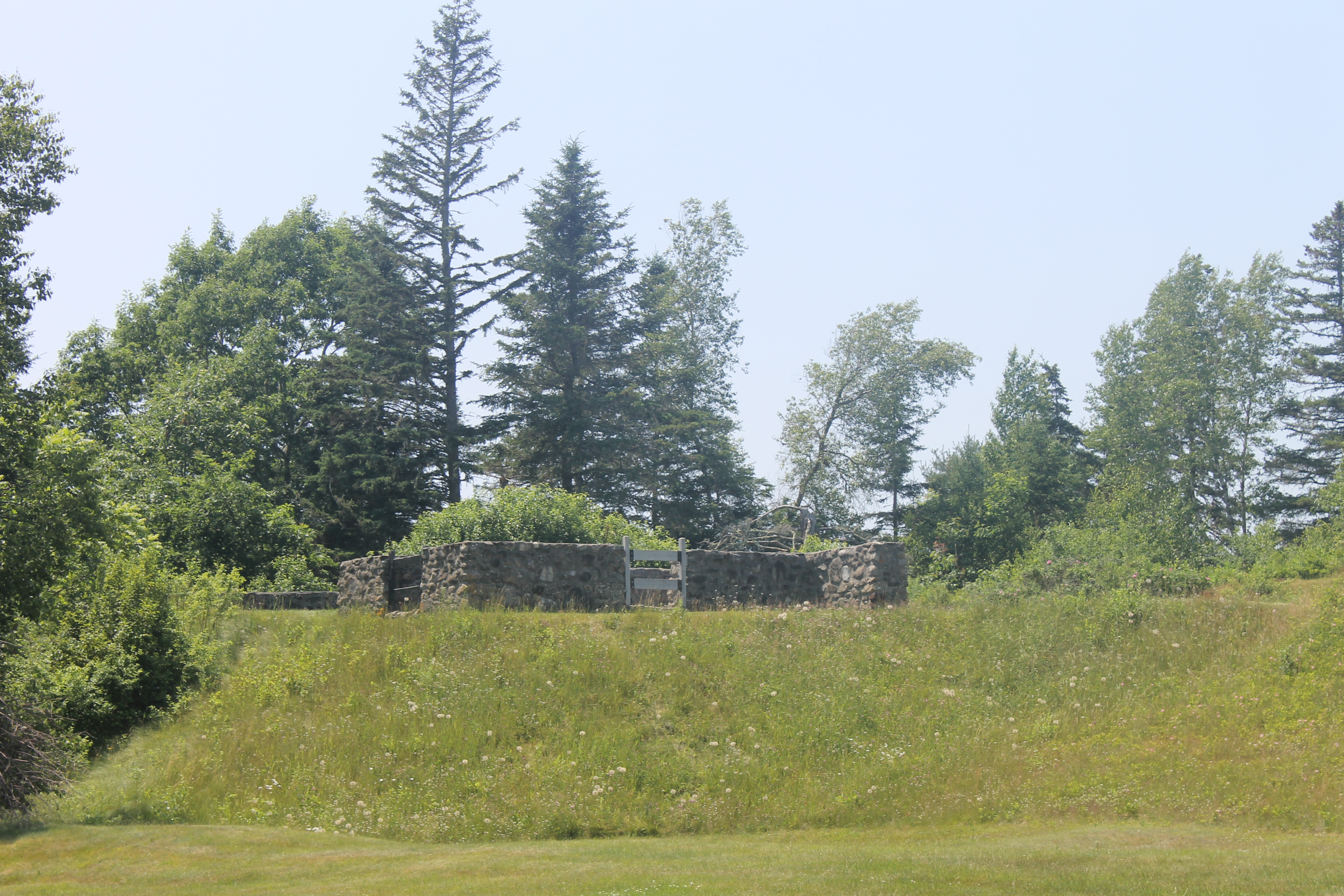
Ruined stone structure in a bastion of Fort George, possibly a magazine reconstructed in the 1960s

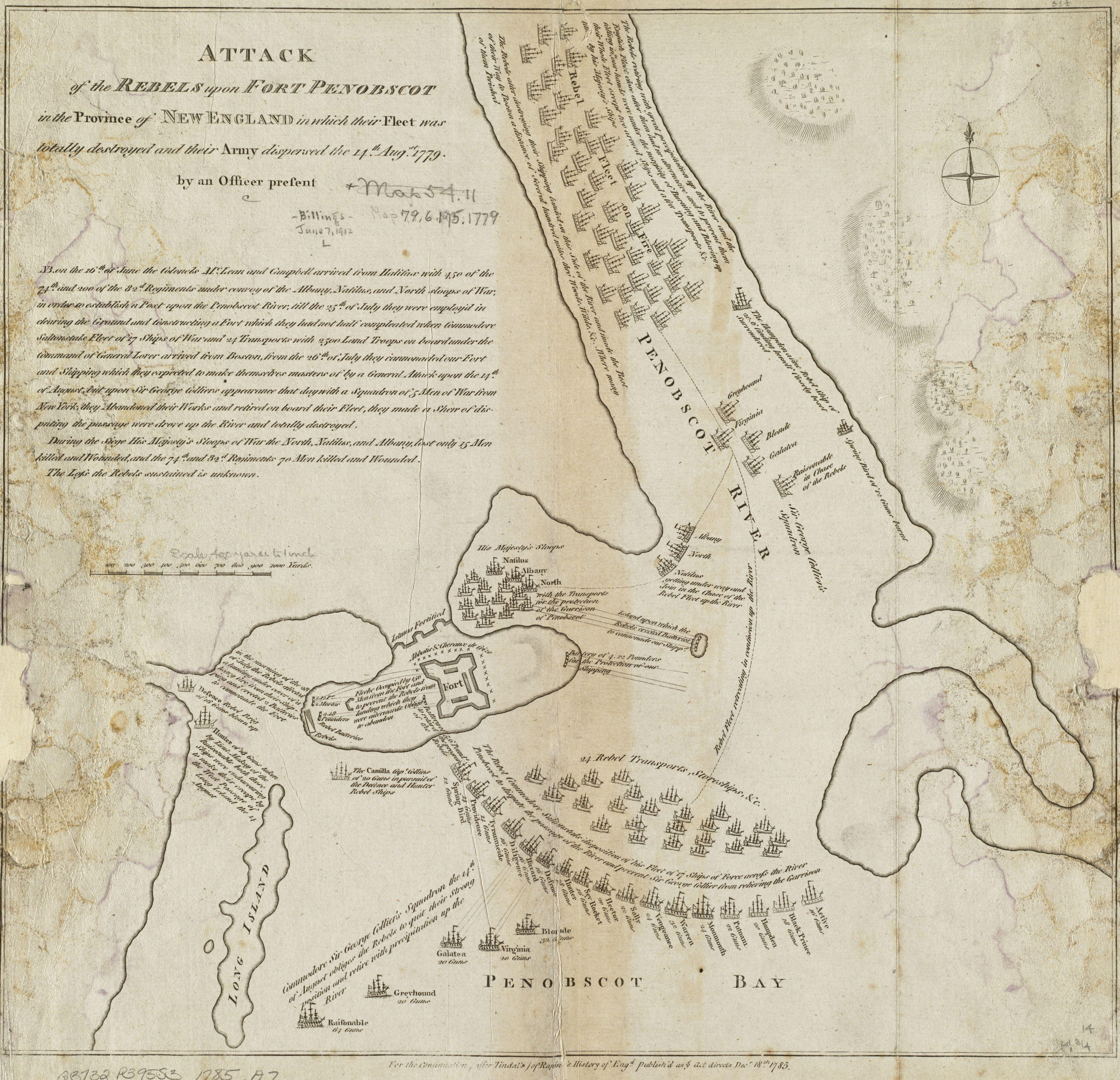
Map of Fort George

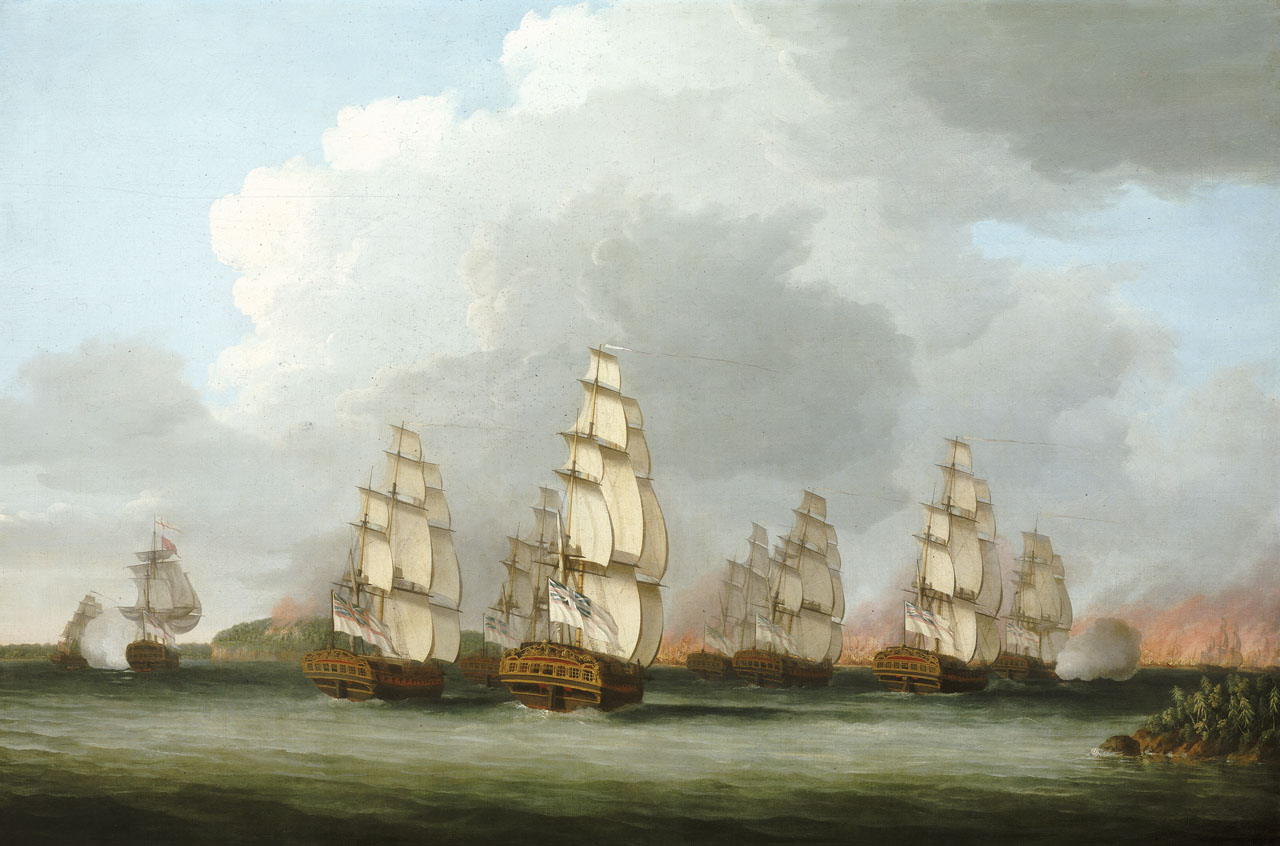
Destruction of the American Fleet at Penobscot Bay by Dominic Serres. Britain defending New Ireland from the Penobscot Expedition

== See also ==
- Defence (1779 brigantine)
- Military history of Nova Scotia
- History of Maine
- National Register of Historic Places listings in Hancock County, Maine

== Bibliography ==
- Cornwell, Bernard (2010). The Fort. New York: HarperCollins. ISBN 9780007331727. A historical novel depicting the Penobscot Expedition, with a non-fiction "Historical Note" (pp. 451–468) on sources and key details.
- Smith, Joshua M. Making Maine: Statehood and the War of 1812 Amherst, MA: the University of Massachusetts Press, 2022.
