= Defence (1779 brigantine) =

1779 American Revolutionary War privateer brigantine ship

History

United States
- Name: Defence
- Laid down: 1779
- Out of service: August 13–15, 1779
- Fate: Burned and sunk

General characteristics
- Sail plan: Brigantine
- Armament: 16 guns
- Privateer Brigantine DEFENCE Shipwreck Site
- U.S. National Register of Historic Places
- Location: Buried in Stockton Springs Harbor
- NRHP reference No.: 75000205
- Added to NRHP: March 18, 1975

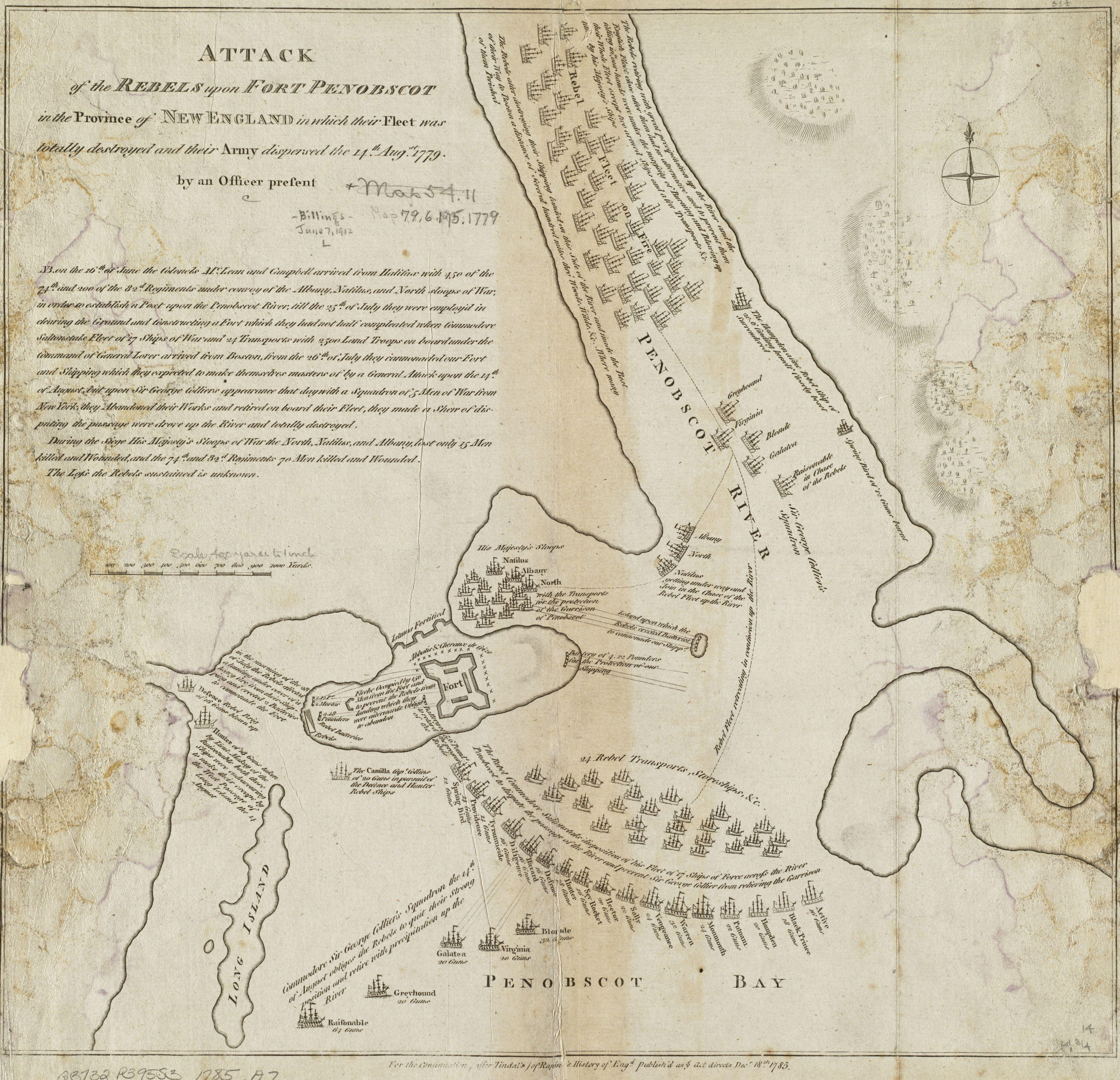
"Defence Rebel Brig of 16 Guns blown up" (Statement on map.)

Defence was an American Revolutionary War privateer that was part of the 1779 Penobscot Expedition, during the American Revolutionary War. A brigantine, she was built that year in Beverly, Massachusetts, and was scuttled near Stockton Springs, Maine in the later stages of the expedition. The wreck site was excavated in the 1970s, and was listed on the National Register of Historic Places in 1975.

== Career ==
Defence was a new ship, laid down in Beverly, Massachusetts in 1779. She was owned by Andrew Cabot and Moses Brown, Beverly merchants who operated a number of privateers. Massachusetts archives list her as a 170-ton brigantine with 16 six-pound cannon and a crew of 100. Defence was recruited to join the Penobscot Expedition, organized by the state of Massachusetts in response to the seizure of Castine (in what is now Maine on Penobscot Bay) by British forces in June 1779. She was commissioned on July 6, 1779, with John Edmonds of Beverly as captain.

The expedition sailed in late July 1779. Due to differences among the commanders, the expedition was never able to mount a successful attack on the British at Castine, and the fleet was scattered after the arrival of British reinforcements on August 13. All of the ships of the expedition were lost, either sunk, scuttled, burned, or captured over the next two days. Defence was torched and abandoned in the harbor of Stockton Springs, where she then sank. The ship's owners were eventually able to recover some compensation from the state for their loss. They built another privateer, also named Defence, of 140 tons in late 1779.

== Wreck site ==
The location of the wreck was discovered in 1972 during a sonar survey conducted by the Maine Maritime Academy and the Massachusetts Institute of Technology, and was the first wreck associated with the expedition to be found. Divers that year recovered one of her cannons and other artifacts. Further dives in 1976 outlined the extent of the wreck (which was found to be in good condition) and recovered further artifacts. Between then and 1980 additional archaeological work completely excavated the wreck, recovering numerous artifacts. The remains of the hulk where then reburied under a layer of mud.

== Legacy ==
Nearby Defence Point (44.4459092°N 68.8586427°W; formerly known as Squaw Point) and Defence Head (44.4436500°N 68.8599400°W) were named in honor of the nearby wreck site. The wreck site was listed on the National Register of Historic Places in 1975.

== See also ==
- Dudley Saltonstall, leader of the Penobscot Expedition
- Defence (ship) for other ships of the same name
- Beverly Cotton Manufactory (Andrew Cabot and Moses Brown were part owners)
- Penobscot Expedition Site, underwater sites of additional expedition wrecks in Bangor and Brewer, Maine
- National Register of Historic Places listings in Waldo County, Maine
