= USS Warren (1776) =

History

United States
- Name: USS Warren
- Builder: Sylvester Bowers
- Launched: 1776
- Stricken: 1779
- Fate: Burned to prevent capture, August 1779

General characteristics
- Class & type: Frigate
- Length: 132 ft 1 in (40.26 m)
- Beam: 34 ft 5 in (10.49 m)
- Depth of hold: 11 ft (3.4 m)
- Propulsion: Sail
- Complement: 250
- Armament: • 12 × 18-pounder (5 kg) guns • 14 × 12-pounder (5 kg) guns • 8 × 9-pounder (2.7 kg) guns

USS Warren was a 32-gun frigate of the Continental Navy. She was one of the thirteen frigates authorized by the Continental Congress on 13 December 1775. With half her main armament being 18-pounders, Warren was more heavily armed than a typical 32-gun frigate of the period. She was named for Joseph Warren on 6 June 1776. Warren was burned to prevent capture in the ill-fated Penobscot Expedition in 1779.

== British blockade ==
Built at Providence, Rhode Island by Sylvester Bowers, Warren was probably one of the first two of the 13 frigates to be completed. The other was the Rhode Island-built frigate Providence. However, difficulties in manning the two ships and the British occupation of Newport, Rhode Island made the tricky task of getting the vessels out to sea doubly difficult.

Although the ship was bottled up in the Providence River, Commodore Esek Hopkins broke his pennant in Warren early in December of 1776. Hopkins was ordered to prepare for sea as soon as possible to cruise the upper half of the eastern seaboard to interdict British troop and logistics shipping traveling the Rhode Island to Virginia route. Hopkins' flagship nevertheless remained anchored in the Providence River for nearly a year afterward. As a result, Hopkins was suspended by the Marine Committee of the Continental Congress for his lethargic performance. Warren, blockaded in Narragansett Bay, did no cruising.

== Successful cruises ==
Aided by strong winds out of the north with masking snow, Warren, now under the command of Captain John B. Hopkins, finally slipped through the British blockade on 16 February 1778, taking minor damage from HMS Somerset and HMS Lark on her way out Narragansett Passage. Hopkins had orders to proceed to a free port, but the men were not dressed for the blizzard conditions so the captain headed to warmer southern waters and began hunting prizes on the open sea. Warren took two on her first cruise: within sight Bermuda she took the ship Neptune, bound from Whitehaven, England to Philadelphia with a cargo of provisions, and also took the snow Robert, heading for Bristol from Sint Eustatius on false Dutch papers, carrying flaxseed and fustic. The Continental frigate put into Boston on 23 March and prepared for another cruise to the West Indies but found manning the ship near-impossible. She finally conducted a second cruise off the eastern seaboard in the autumn, sailing for a time in company with the Massachusetts State Navy ship Tyrannicide in September.

Warren remained at Boston into the winter of 1778 and apparently did not sortie again until 13 March 1779. The frigate under now-Commodore John B. Hopkins, departed in company with Queen of France and Ranger for a cruise off the northeastern coast. The squadron took the armed schooner Hibernia as a prize on 6 April.

Good fortune smiled upon them even more the following day. At 04:00 American lookouts sighted two "fleets" of ships. One contained ten vessels and the other, nine. Warren and her two consorts set upon the nine-ship group to windward and, by 14:00, had captured seven of the nine. The British convoy had been bound from New York to Georgia. The catch included two ships, four brigs, and a schooner. Most of the prizes were richly laden with provisions for the British Army. Warren towed the brig Patriot from 10 April, bringing her triumphantly into port.

Initially, Congress expressed great pleasure with Hopkins' exploit, but its satisfaction soon soured. The Marine Committee charged Hopkins with violating his orders, maintaining that he had returned to port too soon and had not sent his prizes to the nearest port. As a disciplinary measure, the Committee relieved Hopkins, suspended him from the Navy, and gave his command to Captain Dudley Saltonstall. The latter decision would have sad repercussions for both ship and her new commander.

While Warren lay at Boston, fitting out for further operations, the British established a base on the Bagaduce peninsula, near the present site of Castine, Maine, in mid-June 1779. This British intrusion into the figurative back yard of the Massachusetts colony could not go unchallenged. Thus a large—but unfortunately uncoordinated—force was assembled in hope of evicting the newly established British. Saltonstall became the naval commander, in Warren, and was given 19 armed vessels and some 20 transports with which to project the Continental invasion.

== Penobscot Expedition ==
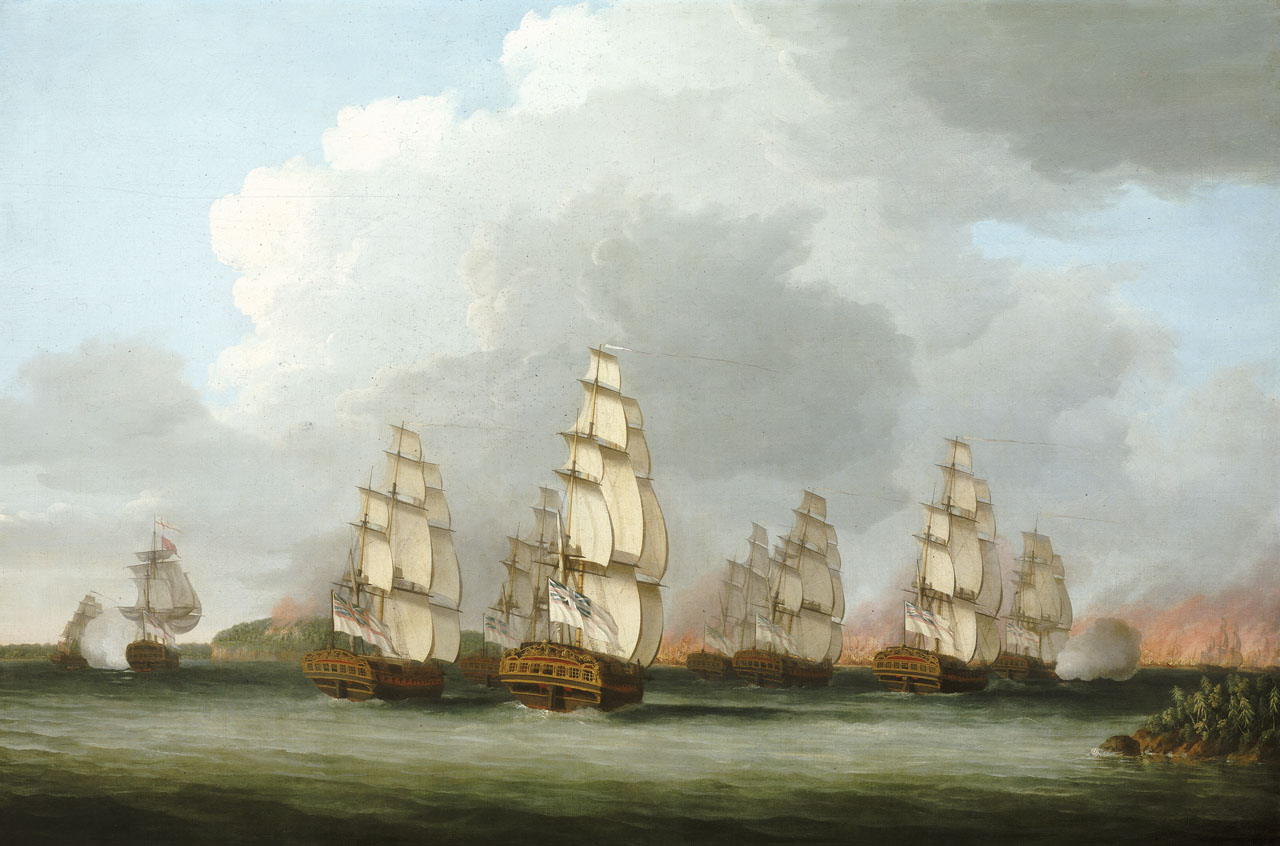
1779 painting of the Penobscot Expedition's defeat by Dominic Serres

On 19 July 1779, the American fleet sailed from Boston, bound for Penobscot Bay. The expedition turned out to be a dismal failure. First, the fleet was unfit for the work and was primarily composed of privateers. The military forces — as in the seagoing ones — lacked decisive leadership; and the land forces lacked artillery and necessary equipment and supplies. Cooperation between military and naval forces was entirely lacking, with the obvious end result that the entire expedition collapsed in disaster.

Warren and the other vessels of the American fleet were consequently burned to prevent their capture by the British. Warren was probably set afire by her crew on either 14 or 15 August 1779 in the Penobscot River, above the Bagaduce peninsula.

Later that autumn, Saltonstall was tried by court martial on board the frigate Deane in Boston harbor. He was summarily dismissed from the Continental Navy.

== See also ==
- List of sailing frigates of the United States Navy
- Bibliography of early American naval history
