= Penobscot Expedition Site =

- U.S. National Register of Historic Places
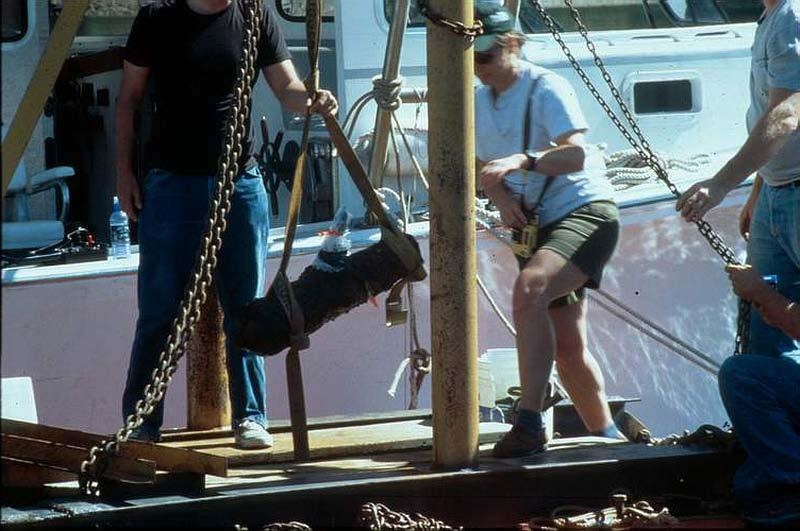
- A cannon is salvaged from the river in 2000
- Nearest city: Bangor and Brewer, Maine
- Area: 30 acres (12 ha)
- Built: 1779
- NRHP reference No.: 73000140
- Added to NRHP: April 23, 1973

The Penobscot Expedition Site is a submerged historic archaeological area in the waters of the Penobscot River between Bangor and Brewer, Maine. The area is the site of the abandonment and loss of many vessels in the disastrous 1779 Penobscot Expedition, an American Revolutionary War expedition in which the rebellious Americans lost an entire fleet of ships. The site was listed on the National Register of Historic Places in 1973; it has been of interest to salvagers and later archaeologists since the early 19th century.

== Description and history ==
The Penobscot River flows into Penobscot Bay, a long bay that nearly bisects the state of Maine. At its head of navigation stand the cities of Bangor (on its western bank) and Brewer (on its eastern bank). The 1779 Penobscot Expedition was a military response by the state of Massachusetts (of which Maine was then part) to the seizure of Castine by British forces in June 1779. Beset by poor leadership, the amphibious expedition was scattered by the arrival of a British fleet on the bay. All of the expedition's ships were captured, scuttled, burned, or abandoned. Nine armed vessels and as many as 16 transports are documented to have made it as far upriver as Bangor.

Some materials were salvaged by the Royal Navy from the abandoned and sunken ships not long after the expedition. Readily-accessible wrecks were salvaged by local residents, and the state also authorized at least one formal salvage operation, whose results are not known. In 1809 Ebenezer Clifford recovered 30 cannons and several tons of cannonballs from the river. Later finds in the Penobscot River included cannons found on the river bottom in the Bangor-Brewer area in 1876 and in 1954–55. The obvious importance of the area, with a well-documented history, led to the area's listing on the National Register of Historic Places in 1973, primarily for the potential archaeological significance of materials located there, including military equipment, cargo, and other artifacts.

Between 1994 and 1997 surveys conducted by the University of Maine located several wrecks in the Penobscot, tentatively identified as the USS Warren and the transport Samuel. In 1998 Brent Phinney, the owner of a riverfront industrial business in Brewer, reported the presence of Revolutionary War-era finds near his property in Brewer, and opposite downtown Bangor. These prompted archaeological teams from the United States Navy (which retains an interest in military shipwrecks) to conduct preliminary surveys in 1999, and more detailed fieldwork and excavation in 2000 and 2001. These surveys determined that the Phinney Site on the Brewer side was of a shipwreck, and that the Shoreline Site on the Bangor side consisted of dispersed artifacts, including cannon and other military hardware. The ship was determined to be a two-masted brig or schooner, and has tentatively been identified as the privateer Diligent.

== See also ==
- National Register of Historic Places listings in Penobscot County, Maine
