= Charming Sally (1779 ship) =

History

Massachusetts
- Name: Charming Sally
- Fate: Scuttled 14 August 1779

General characteristics
- Tons burthen: c.300 (bm)
- Sail plan: Sloop
- Complement: 70
- Armament: 18–22 × 6 &/or 9-pounder guns

Charming Sally was a privateer in service in 1779, during the American Revolutionary War.

Previously a merchant ship, Charming Sally became a privateer when her master, Alexander Holmes, master, received a letter of marque on 27 January 1779.

Around 20 May, Charming Sally, the Massachusetts letter of marque Cadwallader, and the New Hampshire letter of marque Minerva sailed from Portsmouth, New Hampshire, with cargoes of lumber for the West Indies. In early June the three encountered the British privateer Revenge, of some 24 carriage guns, Sheppard, master, which had left Halifax, Nova Scotia, some 12 days earlier. (Note: Revenge was apparently the former Rhode Island privateer Blaze Castle.) A two-hour engagement ensued, with Charming Sally bearing the brunt of the action. Revenge struck after she had five men killed and several wounded, and had sustained substantial damage. Charming Sally had lost one man killed and three men wounded. The three American ships then escorted their prize to Boston, where they arrived on 10 June. Charming Sally remained in Boston to refit, while her two companions resumed their journeys, only to have the British capture them later.

Charming Sally participated in the disastrous, for the Americans, Penobscot Expedition in July and was destroyed there to prevent her capture. The American colonel John Brewer declared her "burnt and blown up". As Sally, she is one of the 15 American vessels that Schomberg lists as having been scuttled on 14 August by their crews to avoid their being captured.
