= New Hampshire State Navy =

State navy of New Hampshire during the American Revolutionary War

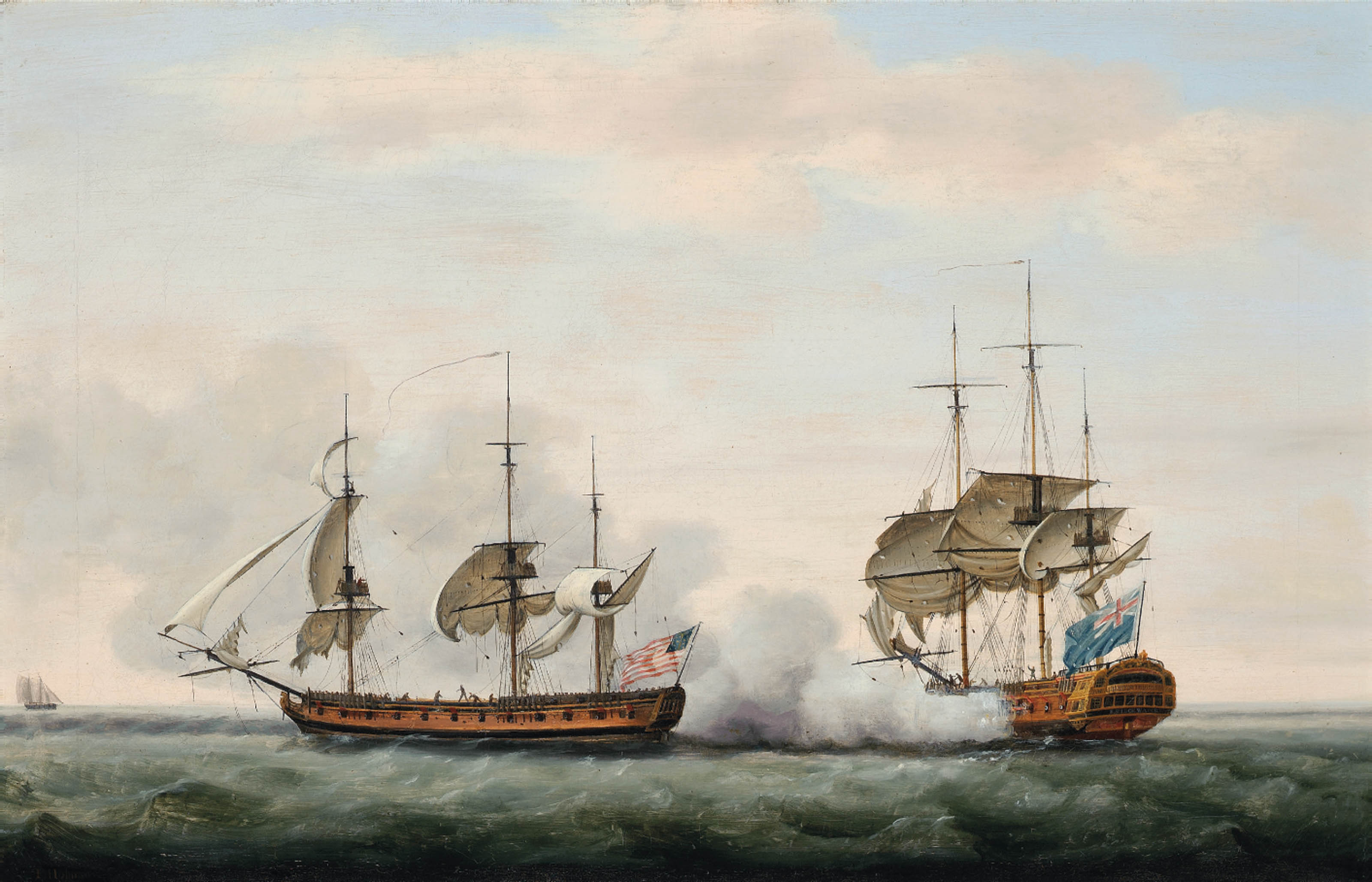
Hampden (left) engaging the British East Indiaman Bridgewater on March 8, 1779

The New Hampshire State Navy was the state navy of New Hampshire during the American Revolutionary War. It consisted of a single ship, the 20-gun former privateer Hampden, which was owned by politician and ship-owner John Langdon. Hampden was commissioned into the state navy in August 1779 for use in the disastrous Penobscot Expedition, during which it was captured by the Royal Navy. Patriot authorities in New Hampshire also issued letters of marque to privateers and established an admiralty court to deal with naval matters, including the disposition of prizes brought in by privateers.
