= HMS Diamond (1774) =

Frigate of the Royal Navy

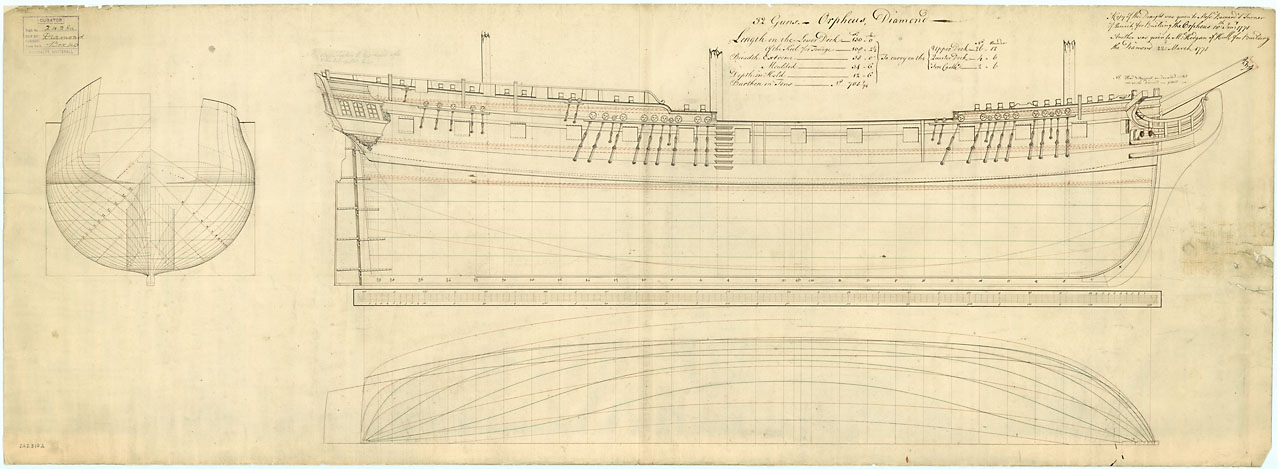
- Diamond

History

Great Britain
- Name: HMS Diamond
- Operator: Royal Navy
- Ordered: 25 December 1770
- Builder: Hodgson & Co., Hull
- Laid down: May 1771
- Launched: 28 May 1774
- Completed: 13 June 1774
- Commissioned: May 1776
- Fate: Sold, December 1784.

General characteristics
- Class & type: Lowestoffe-class frigate
- Tons burthen: 709 76/94 (bm)
- Length: 130 ft 6 in (39.78 m)
- Beam: 35 ft 1 in (10.69 m)
- Depth of hold: 12 ft 6 in (3.81 m)
- Sail plan: Full-rigged ship
- Complement: 220
- Armament: UD: 26 × 12-pounder guns; QD: 4 × 6-pounder guns; Fc: 2 × 6-pounder guns

The fourth HMS Diamond was a modified Lowestoffe-class fifth-rate frigate ordered in 1770, launched in 1774, but did not begin service until 1776. Diamond served off the eastern North American coast and shared in the capture at least one brig during the American Revolutionary War. The frigate was paid off in 1779, but returned to service the same year after being coppered. Diamond sailed to the West Indies in 1780, was paid off a final time in 1783 and sold in 1784.

== Construction and service ==
Diamond was ordered on 25 December 1770 as one of five fifth-rate frigates of 32 guns each contained in the emergency frigate-building programme inaugurated when the likelihood of war with Spain arose over the ownership of the Falkland Islands (eight sixth-rate frigates of 28 guns each were ordered at the same time). Sir Thomas Slade's design for the Lowestoffes was approved, but was revised to produce a more rounded midships section; the amended design was approved on 3 January 1771 by Hawke's outgoing Admiralty Board, just before it was replaced. The contract to build Diamond was awarded to Hodgson & Co at Hull, the keel being laid in May 1771, and the frigate was launched on 28 May 1774, at a cost of £11,506.9.1d. She sailed from Hull on 13 June 1774 for Chatham Dockyard, where she remained for nearly two years before she was completed and fitted out to the Navy Board's needs (for £4,169.8.6d) in February to May 1776.

Diamond was first commissioned in February 1776 under Captain Charles Fielding. On completion, she sailed for North America on 20 July 1776.

On 11 January, 1778 she captured merchant sloop "Prudence" off Dyer Island, Rhode Island. She was sent into Newport, Rhode Island. During the week of 15-21 March, 1778, she captured a schooner in Duck Creek in Pennsylvania. On 24 May 1778 she, with HMS Raisonnable, captured and burned American schooner "Fly" off Cape Cod. On 27 May she, with HMS Raisonnable, captured American brig "Sally" off Cape Cod. On 28 May she, with HMS Raisonnable, captured Connecticut privateer "General McDougall" off Cape Cod. On 21 October 1778, Diamond and the brig Diligent stopped the brig Recovery at 42°17′N 69°00′W. Recovery was sailing from Portsmouth to Charles Town with a cargo of lumber, and her captors sent her into New York.

=== Fate ===
Diamond was paid off into ordinary in 1779, but after being coppered she was recommissioned in November 1779 under Captain William Forster, and sailed for Jamaica on 13 April 1780. Diamond was finally paid off in August 1783 and was sold at Plymouth (for £405) on 30 December 1784.
