= Nautilus Island, Maine =

- Island Farm
- Location within the state of Maine
- Coordinates: 44°22′30″N 68°48′25″W
- Country: United States
- State: Maine
- County: Hancock
- Elevation: 46 ft (14 m)
- Time zone: UTC-5 (Eastern (EST))
  - Summer (DST): UTC-4 (EDT)
- ZIP code: 04421
- Area code: 207

Nautilus Island is a privately owned island in Penobscot Bay, Maine, United States. It is part of the Town of Brooksville, in Hancock County.

== Overview ==
Lying 0.5 mi (0.80 km) south of Castine and guarding the entrance to Castine Harbor, the island has a long, rich history. During the Revolutionary War, the American vessel Hazard engaged the British sloop of war Nautilus off the island's shores and the island has been known as Nautilus ever since. It was captured from the British on July 26, 1779, by men of the Continental Marines commanded by Paul Revere as part of action undertaken by the Penobscot Expedition.

Nautilus Island is 38 acres (15 ha). It has century-old buildings and tennis courts.

The island features in the opening of the famous poem "Skunk Hour" by Robert Lowell: "Nautilus Island's hermit / heiress still lives through winter in her Spartan cottage; / her sheep still graze above the sea. / ... Thirsting for the hierarchic privacy / of Queen Victoria's century, / she buys up all / the eyesores facing her shore, / and lets them fall."

== See also ==
- List of islands of Maine
- Penobscot Expedition
- Penobscot Bay
