= List of United States state navies in the American Revolutionary War =

This is a list of the United States state navies in the American Revolutionary War. Beginning in 1775 after the outbreak of the American Revolutionary War, eleven of the Thirteen Colonies established state navies or owned one or more armed merchantmen for military operations. Some state navies, including the Massachusetts Naval Militia, were established prior to the creation of the Continental Navy. State navies were usually created to participate in coastal defense operations against the actions of the Royal Navy and British privateers or to assist in shore defenses. Some state navies, like those of New Hampshire and Georgia were quite small; New Hampshire only commissioned one ship. Delaware and New Jersey were the only states that did not commission and operate any ships.

== List of state navies ==
- New Hampshire State Navy
- Massachusetts State Navy
- Rhode Island State Navy
- Connecticut State Navy
- New York State Navy
- Pennsylvania State Navy
- Maryland State Navy
- Virginia State Navy
- North Carolina State Navy
- South Carolina State Navy
- Georgia State Navy

== States without navies ==
New Jersey never authorized the purchase of any ships, or established admiralty courts. Both matters were proposed to the state assembly in 1776, but were not acted upon.

Delaware never authorized the purchase of armed vessels. Some of its Committees of Safety apparently commissioned ships for specific purposes; the Farmer was commissioned by the Sussex County committee to sail to St. Eustatius to purchase gunpowder.

== See also ==
- Bibliography of early American naval history
- Continental Navy

== Bibliography ==
- Paullin, Charles Oscar (1906). The navy of the American Revolution: its administration, its policy and its achievements. The Burrows Brothers Co. p. 315. "paullin massachusetts navy." This work contains summary information on each of the various state navies.
- Shomette, Donald (2007). Shipwrecks, sea raiders, and maritime disasters along the Delmarva coast, 1632-2004. JHU Press. ISBN 978-0-8018-8670-6.
