= The Fort (novel) =

2010 historical novel by Bernard Cornwell

- Cover of the first UK edition
- Author: Bernard Cornwell
- Language: English
- Genre: Historical Novel
- Publisher: HarperCollins
- Publication date: 30 September 2010
- Publication place: United Kingdom
- Media type: Print
- Pages: 480 pp (first edition, hardback)
- ISBN: 978-0-00-733172-7 (first edition, hardback)
- OCLC: 636905232

The Fort is a 2010 historical novel written by Bernard Cornwell which relates to the events of the Penobscot Expedition of 1779 during the American Revolutionary War. The novel centers on the efforts of the British to establish and hold the fort against superior numbers of American patriots, and it contrasts the actions of John Moore and Paul Revere. Moore later laid the foundations of the light infantry doctrine used by the 95th Rifles and others against the French in the Revolutionary and Napoleonic wars. The novel also discusses the major loss and misjudgement by the Americans and how the British took advantage of it.

== Publication ==
- The book was released on 30 September 2010 in the United Kingdom.
