= Solomon Lovell =

- Born: June 1, 1732; Abington, Massachusetts
- Died: September 9, 1801 (aged 69); Weymouth, Massachusetts
- Burial place: North Weymouth Cemetery
- Military career
- Allegiance: Massachusetts; United States
- Branch: Massachusetts Militia; Continental Army
- Rank: Brigadier general

Brigadier-General Solomon Lovell (June 1, 1732 – September 9, 1801) was an American military officer and politician who served in the American Revolutionary War. He is best known for leading the land forces during the 1779 Penobscot Expedition, a disastrous attempt by Massachusetts to dislodge a British force from a settlement on a peninsula in Penobscot Bay, present-day Castine, Maine.

== Early life ==
Solomon Lovell was born in Abington, Massachusetts on June 1, 1732, to David and Mary (née Torrey) Lovell. His father was a Harvard graduate, teacher, and preacher. David Lovell died when Solomon was quite young, and the boy was raised first by his grandfather Enoch Lovell, and after Enoch Lovell's death by his stepfather, Samuel Kingman. Kingman, a military man, may have influenced the young Solomon to develop an interest in the military. Lovell's military service during the French and Indian War (1754–1760) is not known in detail; he is known to have served as a first lieutenant in a militia company at Lake George, New York during the 1756 campaign.

In 1758 he married Lydia Holbrook, the daughter of a neighbor. The couple had two children; the first died in infancy, and Lydia died during the birth of their second child in 1761. The following year Lovell remarried, to Hannah Pittey, a woman who had originally spurned his proposal to her before his first marriage. With Hannah he settled into her house in Weymouth; they had seven children, three of whom survived to adulthood. He was active in town affairs, and began serving in the provincial assembly in 1771. He was also active in the local militia, rising to the rank of major in July 1771 and colonel in 1775.

== American Revolutionary War ==
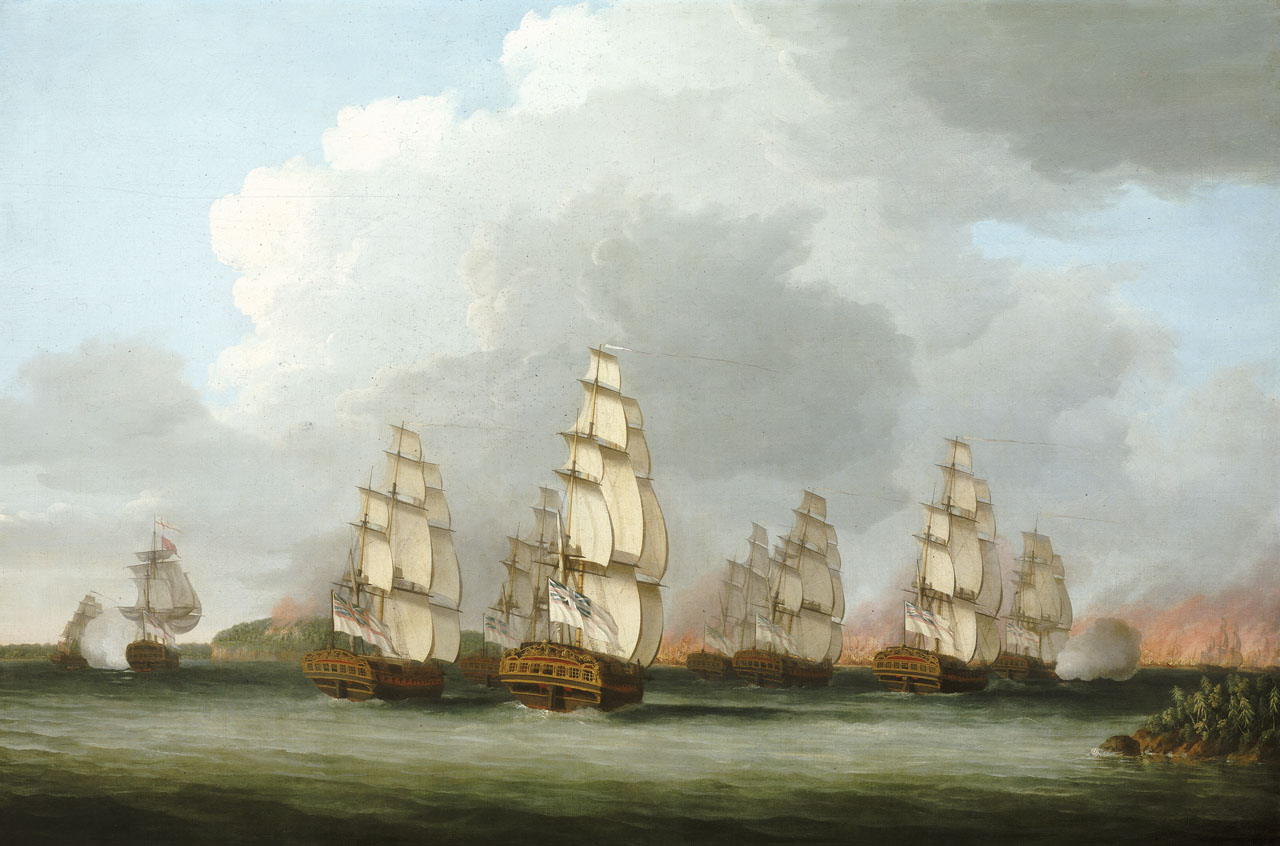
1779 painting of the Penobscot Expedition's defeat by Dominic Serres

With the outbreak of the American Revolutionary War with the Battles of Lexington and Concord in April 1775, Lovell's military activity increased. He was commissioned a colonel of the 2nd Massachusetts Regiment in February 1776, and his troops were among those that occupied the heights south of Boston, prompting the British to withdraw the city. He continued to be active in the defense of eastern Massachusetts, and was promoted to brigadier general of the Suffolk County militia on June 24, 1777. Lovell led Massachusetts troops in the 1778 Battle of Rhode Island, where Lovell was one of several officers who "distinguished themselves by their coolness and courage."

In 1779 the British sent a force to occupy the Bagaduce peninsula in Penobscot Bay, in order to establish a settlement they called New Ireland. This territory, now part of the state of Maine, was then part of Massachusetts, and the state mobilized a large fleet and its militia to dislodge the British. Lovell was given command of the land forces, and the naval fleet was under the command of Connecticut native Dudley Saltonstall. Both men were ordered to cooperate with one another, but neither was given a clear authority over the other; this was a major contributing factor to the disastrous Penobscot Expedition that followed.

During the entire course of the expedition, Lovell frequently complained (in his writings, and reportedly in war councils) of Saltonstall's unwillingness to take any sort of risks with the fleet in support of attacks on the British fortifications. The expedition dissolved in confusion with the arrival of a Royal Navy fleet; the entire Massachusetts fleet was captured or destroyed, and the land forces that escaped were forced to make an arduous journey overland. Lovell did not return to Boston until September 20, after making arrangements for defenses in the Kennebec River valley. The board of inquiry established by the state completely exonerated Lovell, and severely chastised Commodore Saltonstall for his failures. Saltonstall was court-martialed and cashiered out of the Continental Navy.

== Later life ==
Lovell had, during the war, periodically served as a representative to the state legislature. He continued to do so after the war, also occasionally serving as town selectman. When Norfolk County was separated from Suffolk County, Lovell was given the task of petitioning the legislature to keep Weymouth a part of Suffolk County. He was unsuccessful in this effort; Weymouth is now in Norfolk County. Lovell died in Weymouth on September 9, 1801, having outlived his wife by six years. He is buried in the Pittey family tomb in Weymouth.
