= 82nd Regiment of Foot (1777) =

- Active: 16 December 1777 – 1784
- Country: Kingdom of Great Britain (1777–1784)
- Branch: Army
- Type: Line Infantry

The 82nd Regiment of Foot was a British army regiment raised for service in the American Revolutionary War.

The regiment was raised in Lanarkshire, Scotland on 16 December 1777. It was sent to New York in August 1779 and then to establish and defend New Ireland in June 1779. It was sent to Wilmington, North Carolina in April 1781 and its light company was interned at Yorktown. It was disbanded in 1784.
