= Dudley Saltonstall =

American naval officer, privateer, merchant and slave trader

- Born: September 8, 1738; New London, Connecticut
- Died: 1796 (aged 57–58); West Indies
- Relatives: Richard Saltonstall (great-grandfather); John Winthrop (great-grandfather); Gilbert S. Carpenter (great-grandson)
- Military career
- Allegiance: United States
- Branch: Continental Navy
- Service years: 1775–1779
- Rank: Commodore
- Commands: USS Alfred; USS Trumbull; USS Warren
- Conflicts: American Revolutionary War; Raid of Nassau; Action of 6 April 1776; Penobscot Expedition
- Other work: Naval officer, privateer, merchant and slave trader

Commodore Dudley Saltonstall (September 8, 1738 – 1796) was an American naval officer, privateer, merchant and slave trader who served in the American Revolutionary War. He is best known as the commander of the naval forces of the 1779 Penobscot Expedition, which ended in complete disaster, with all ships lost. (Note: Dudley Saltonstall should not be confused with another Connecticut naval officer with the same surname, Nathaniel Saltonstall, who was a captain of American privateer ships during the war.) Norton (2003) argues the Penobscot Expedition was a total failure due to poor planning, inadequate training, and timid leadership on the part of Saltonstall.

== Early life ==
Dudley Saltonstall was born on September 8, 1738, to Gurdon Saltonstall Jr and Mary Winthrop. Both sides of his family were prominent in British colonial politics; his 3X great-grandfather on his father's side was Sir Richard Saltonstall, and his mother was descended from John Winthrop, who served as governor of the Province of Massachusetts Bay in the 17th century. His father was a prominent figure in New London and Connecticut politics, serving as a probate judge and a leader of the community. In 1765 he married Frances Babcock, the daughter of Joshua Babcock, a doctor and lawyer who served on the supreme court of the Rhode Island Colony.

Saltonstall took positions on the ships of the colonial mercantile fleet, and served as a merchant captain during the Seven Years' War. In April 1762 he was given command of a letter of marque brigantine, the Britannia, with which he made several successful voyages to the West Indies. During these years he established a reputation as a competent ship's captain.

== Continental Navy ==
When the American Revolutionary War broke out, Saltonstall joined Connecticut's militia, helping to defend New London's harbor. When the Continental Navy was established, he was given one of the first captain's commissions, based on the recommendation of his brother-in-law Silas Deane, who served on Connecticut's Naval Committee. He was given command of Alfred, the flagship of the new navy's commodore, Esek Hopkins. He hired John Paul Jones as his first lieutenant, and gave him the responsibility of overseeing the fitting out of the newly acquired ship. He and Jones did not get along well, as Jones did not like Saltonstall's sometimes distant and superior demeanor.

Saltonstall captained Alfred on the Continental Navy's maiden voyage in March 1776, an expedition to Nassau in the Bahamas whose objective was arms and critically needed gunpowder. The expedition was somewhat successful, as Nassau was taken, but its governor had managed to remove much of the gunpowder before the takeover was completed. The return voyage was uneventful, although smallpox was spreading through the ships' crews, until the fleet neared Block Island. On April 4 and 5, the fleet captured British ships. On the morning of April 6, HMS Glasgow was spotted, and was brought to action. In the ensuing battle, Alfred's steering controls were damaged by cannon fire, and she drifted out of the action. Glasgow was able to escape to Newport outrunning the heavily laden fleet.

While the expedition was successful, Hopkins and Saltonstall were questioned over the fleet's failure to follow its stated orders, which had been to engage the British fleet off the Carolinas, and over its failure to capture the clearly outnumbered Glasgow. Saltonstall was not censured, but other captains in the fleet were punished for cowardly behavior.

In September 1776 Saltonstall was given command of Trumbull, which had been built at a shipyard on the Connecticut River. To Saltonstall's dismay, she was too heavily laden to cross the sand bar at the mouth of the river. After numerous repeated attempts to pass the bar in 1776 and 1777, the Marine Committee gave her command to Elisha Hinman, who successfully floated her into Long Island Sound in August 1779.

Saltonstall's next command was Warren, based in Boston. He replaced Hopkins at her helm in July 1779; Hopkins was suspended for breach of orders, and was eventually dismissed from the navy after the failure of the Penobscot Expedition.

== Penobscot expedition ==
In the summer of 1779, the British established a base in Penobscot Bay near present-day Castine, Maine, intended to be the beginning of a new province, New Ireland, and a stronghold for attacking American privateers operating against British shipping.

The state of Massachusetts (which at that time included the District of Maine), organized an expedition to dislodge the British from this position. Saltonstall, the senior Continental Navy commander, was given command of the naval forces, which consisted primarily of ships from the Massachusetts State Navy, a large number of privateers, and a few Continental Navy ships, including Warren. (Note: Navy Board Eastern Department Boston July 13, 1779 To Dudley Saltonstall Esqr Commander of the Ship Warren Your ship being ready for the Sea you are to take under your direction the Brigt Diligent & all the Vessells belonging to or employed by this State for an Expedition Against the Enemy at Penobscot & proceed with them on said Expedition after Rendezvousing at Townsend where you will meet with & take with you the Sloop Providence Brigt Active & any other Vessell destined to the same Service. You are to take every Measure & use your Utmost Endeavours to Captivate Kill or destroy the Enemies whole Force both by Sea & Land & the more effectually to answer that purpose you are to Consult Measures & preserve the greatest harmony with the Commander of the Land Forces that the Navy & Army may Cooperate & assist each other when that business is Effected or if on your Arrival you shall find the Enemy have left Penobscot & that shore & retired out of your reach You are then to take with you the Sloop Providence & Brigt Diligent who are Ordered to Cruise with you and under your Command & after furnishing the Commanders of them with Copys of your orders & proper directions & Signals proceed immediately to &c. &c. The aforegoing is a true Extract of the orders given by the Navy Board Eastern department to Captain Saltonstall so far as they relate to the Penobscot Expedition as appears of record. Attest Willm Story C N B E d) Command of the land forces accompanying the expedition was given to a relatively inexperienced Massachusetts militia brigadier general, Solomon Lovell.

The unwieldy fleet had virtually no captains with experience in any sort of fleet operations, and many of them were used to the independence afforded by their privateering operations. While Saltonstall had participated in the Nassau expedition, he had only exercised command over his ship. Furthermore, the expedition was to be his maiden voyage aboard his new command. The expedition sailed for Penobscot Bay on July 19. When it arrived near the British base, commanders of the various forces met to consider their attack in a council that was later described by Paul Revere, the militia's artillery leader, as "more like a meeting in a Coffee House than a council of War". Nothing of consequence was agreed, and the resultant lack of coordination between the various forces proved disastrous. Saltonstall and Lovell disagreed on tactics, and Saltonstall refused to take steps to engage the three British ships that were anchored near the fort in somewhat treacherous waters. He finally engaged Henry Mowat's small fleet at long range on June 29; his inexperienced gunnery crews did little damage, while Mowat's did significant damage to Warren and other ships. This made Saltonstall reluctant to order further engagements, including in support of land and amphibious operations. The arrival of a British relief fleet under Admiral George Collier at the mouth of the bay led to further strains. Saltonstall at first set up a line of defense against the arriving fleet, but when they began to close, he essentially ordered each ship to act independently, and the fleet organization dissolved. Most of the ships were eventually grounded and burned; some were captured after brief exchanges by the British. The land forces were essentially abandoned, and many men had to make lengthy overland treks back to civilization.

Saltonstall's reported inaction and timidity were blamed for the failure of the expedition. This may have been an unfair judgement, as few people understood the technological and nautical limitations Saltonstall faced. Other ship captains in the expedition overwhelmingly agreed that a naval assault was too risky without a simultaneous land attack on the British fort, which Lovell refused to provide. On September 7, 1779, a Warrant for Court Martial was issued by the Navy Board, Eastern Department, against Saltonstall. (Note: Warrant for Court Martial On Dudley Saltonstall Esq. September 7th 1779 Navy Board Eastern Department To Saml. Nicholson Esq. Captain Commander in the Navy of the United States of America. Whereas the principal part of the Fleet employed in the Expedition against the Enemy at Penobscot Particularly the Ship Warren, Sloop Providence, Brigantine Diligent, all under the Command of Dudley Saltonstall Esq. late Captn. And Comdr. Of the Continental Frigate Warren, have been destroyed and lost as is Suggested by the bad conduct of the said Dudley Saltonstall, & his conduct is now therefore become a proper subject for the Examination and Judgment of Court Martial. We do therefore by virtue of the Power and Authority with which we are vested hereby Order and Direct that a Court Martial be called for that purpose, which Court Martial we do hereby appoint to consist of you the aformd. Saml. Nicholson as President - and of John Peele Rathbone - and Samuel Tucker Esq. Captain in the C. Navy - and of Mr. David Phipps. Adam Thaxter - and Hopley Yeaton first Lieutenants in the C. Navy - and of Seth Baxter - Edmond Arrowsmith - and Willm. Jones Captains of Marines in C. Navy - and of Saml. Pritchard - William Waterman - and Peter Green Lieutents. Of Marines in C. Navy - who together are to constitute this Court Martial, to set on board the Continental Ship Deane now lying in the Harbour of Boston, on Tuesday the 14th Day of this Inst. September. at 10 Clock in the Forenoon with power to Adjourn from Time to Time and Place to Place as occasions may require - And the Court Martial being so constituted and met at Time and Place aforesd. and Qualified agreeable to the Resolutions of Congress, are to consider & thoroughly examine the Conduct of the said Dudley Saltonstall during his command aforesd. and hear & examine all such Matters & Informations, as shall then be bro't before you, relating to the Conduct of the said Dudley Saltonstall during his aforesd. Command on proper Evidence, thereon to Try, Determine, & make up Judgment on the said Dudley Saltonstall for the aforesd. Losses, & his Conduct during his Command aforesaid. According to the Rules of Naval Discipline, and the Articles for the Regulation of the American Navy. And if in any Respect found guilty of being by his Conduct the occasion of the Disgrace and Losses aforesd. To pass sentence accordingly - which sentence you are to return to us with the Evidence & other Papers had before you. And you are hereby Authorized, and Empowered to Order and Direct the attendance of any Master at Arms - Sergeants of Marines, or any other Officer, or Seaman of the C. Navy, who may be wanted as an Attendant on your said Court, & also to Summon such Witnesses as you may suppose able to give Testimony in the Matter. And for so doing this shall be to you, & each of you Members of said Court Martial, hereby appointed, and all others concerned a sufficient Warrant. Given under our Hands at Boston this Seventh Day of September AD 1779 - In the fourth year of the Independence of the United States of America. W(illiam) Vernon J(ames) Warren) He was found guilty at the trial of ineptitude at Penobscot and was dismissed from the Navy as being "ever after incompetent to hold a government office or state post" the following October by the "Committee for Enquiring into the Failure of the Penobscot Expedition" of the Massachusetts General Court which determined that failure of the expedition was primarily the result of the "want of proper Spirit and Energy on the part of the Commodore", that he "discouraged any Enterprizes or offensive [attack] Measures on the part of our Fleet", and that the total destruction of the fleet was occasioned "principally by the Commodore's not exerting himself at all at the time of the Retreat in opposing the Enemies' foremost Ships in pursuit."

The story of the Penobscot Expedition forms the basis of the historical novel, The Fort by Bernard Cornwell.

== Later career ==
Saltonstall returned to Connecticut, and convinced one of his wife's relatives, Adam Babcock, to support him in a privateering venture. As captain of the 16-gun brig Minerva, he embarked on a successful career as a privateer in 1781. Among his prizes was the richest captured by a Connecticut ship; the merchantman Hannah was valued at £80,000.

After the war, he engaged in trade with the West Indies, and also dabbled in the slave trade. He died in 1796 in the West Indies, apparently of a tropical disease.
