= Destruction of the American Fleet at Penobscot Bay =

Painting by Dominic Serres

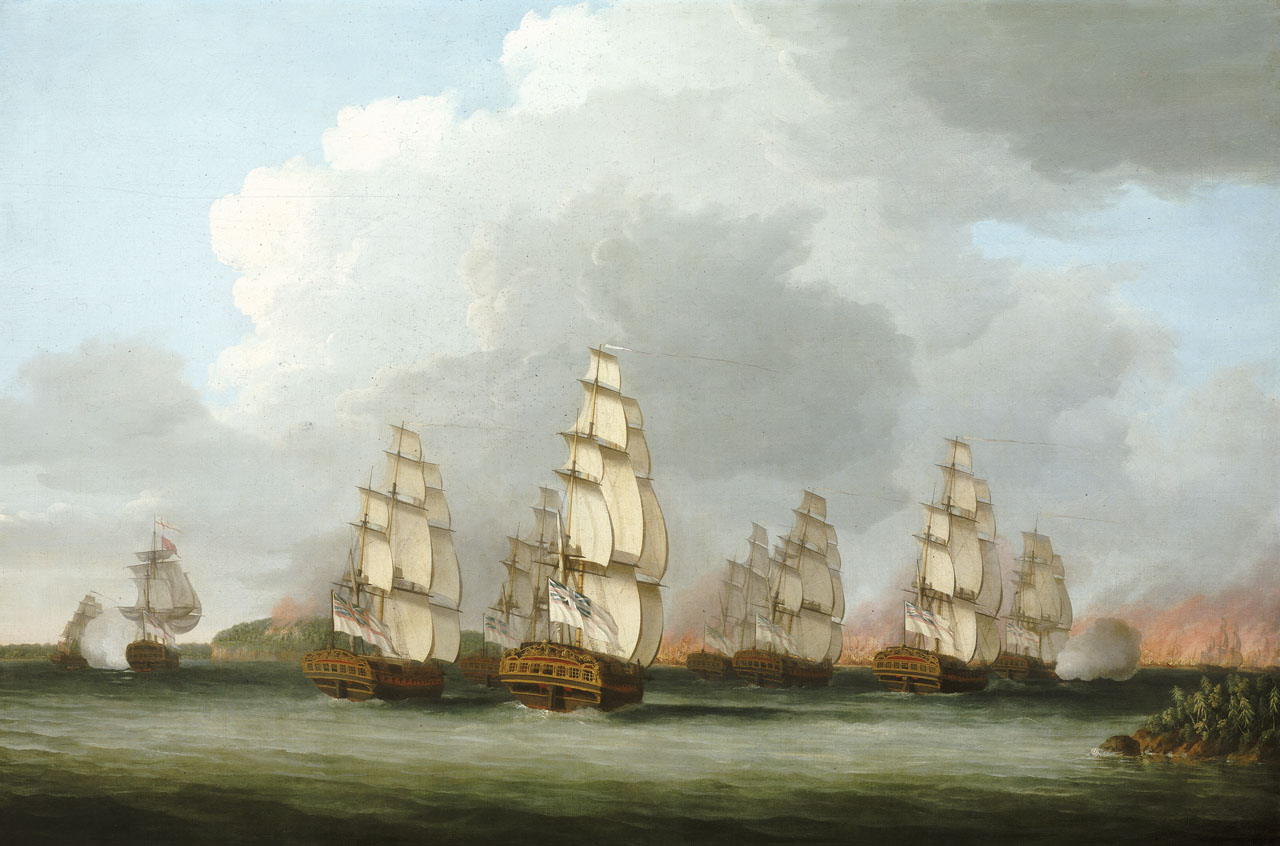
- Artist: Dominic Serres
- Year: c. 1779
- Type: Oil on canvas, history painting
- Dimensions: 101.6 cm × 152.4 cm (40.0 in × 60.0 in)
- Location: National Maritime Museum, Greenwich

Destruction of the American Fleet at Penobscot Bay is an oil on canvas history painting by the French-born artist Dominic Serres, from c. 1779.

== History and description ==
It depicts a scene from the Penobscot Expedition on 14 August 1779 during the American War of Independence. After a British force had landed in Penobscot Bay in modern-day Maine, an expedition largely from Massachusetts moved to dislodge them. A smaller relief force of the Royal Navy under George Collier arrived from New York and attacked, destroying much of the shipping.

Serres, a member of the Royal Academy, settled in London and developed a reputation of his maritime paintings. The painting was commissioned by Collier to commemorate the victory. On the left of the picture HMS Raisonnable can be seen firing into the Hunter while on the right the British squadron chases the American ships upriver, many of them already ablaze. From British shore batteries comes supporting fire. Today the painting is in the collection of the National Maritime Museum in Greenwich.

== Bibliography ==
- Black, Jeremy. Britain As A Military Power, 1688-1815. Routledge, 2002.
- Greenburg, Michael M. The Court-Martial of Paul Revere: A Son of Liberty and America's Forgotten Military Disaster. University Press of New England, 2014.
- Leamon, James S. Revolution Downeast: The War for American Independence in Maine. University of Massachusetts Press, 1993.
- Russett, Alan. Dominic Serres, R.A., 1719-1793: War Artist to the Navy. Antique Collectors' Club, 2001.
