= HMS Rifleman (1809) =

British naval brig-sloop, merchantman, and whaler (1809–1856)

- Rifleman

History

United Kingdom
- Name: HMS Rifleman
- Ordered: 5 November 1808
- Builder: John King, Upnor
- Laid down: January 1809
- Launched: 12 August 1809
- Fate: Sold 1836

United Kingdom
- Port of registry: London
- Acquired: 1836 by purchase
- Fate: No longer listed in Lloyd's Register after 1856

General characteristics
- Class & type: Cruizer-class brig-sloop
- Tons burthen: 383, or 38386/94, or 402 (bm)
- Length: 100 ft 10 in (30.7 m) (overall); 77 ft 4 in (23.6 m) (keel)
- Beam: 30 ft 8 in (9.3 m)
- Draught: 6 ft 8 in (2.0 m) (unladen); 11 ft 2 in (3.4 m) (laden)
- Depth of hold: 12 ft 9 in (3.9 m)
- Propulsion: Sails
- Sail plan: Brig rigged
- Complement: 121
- Armament: 16 × 32-pounder carronades; 2 × 6-pounder chase guns

Rifleman was a Cruizer-class brig-sloop launched in 1809 for the Royal Navy. She served in the North Sea, on the Halifax and Jamaica stations, and in the Mediterranean Sea. During her service she recaptured a Royal Navy vessel in Danish service, and two privateers. The Navy sold her in 1836 and she proceed to sail as a merchantman and whaler between 1837 and 1856.

== Royal Navy ==
Commander Alexander Innes commissioned Rifleman in September 1809. Commander Joseph Pearce replaced Innes in November 1810.

Rifleman left Portsmouth on 28 January 1811, bound for Oporto. On 9 March she left Falmouth as escort to a convoy 130 vessels bound for Lisbon and beyond.

On 11 May 1811 Rifleman encountered the Danish vessel The Alban, which was the former Royal Navy schooner HMS Alban that the Danes had captured on 12 September 1809. The Alban was under the command of Lieutenant Thøger Emil Rosenørn when Rifleman encountered her near the Shetland Islands. (Note: Rosenørn had been the captain of Salorman when the British captured her at Nyborg in 1808.) Rifleman chased The Alban for twelve hours before she succeeded in capturing the Dane. The Alban was armed with 12 guns and had a crew of 58 men. (Note: Danish records report her official complement as 38 men. They also show her armament as consisting of ten 18-pounder carronades and two 12-pounder carronades.) She was three days out of Farsund, Norway, but had not captured anything.

According to Danish sources, Rosenørn fought bravely and when he saw that defeat was inevitable, he hacked away rigging and created holes in the hull before he surrendered. Even so, The Alban did not sink, and Rifleman sent her into Leith. The Royal Navy took her back into service as Alban.

Next Rifleman captured Liebe (28 February 1812), Maria Dorothea (7 March), and Bodel Maria (24 March). Rifleman shared the prize money with Nightingale by agreement.

On 9 March Rifleman was in company with Venus and shared in the proceeds of the capture the Danish sloop Anna Serina, J. Brodersoit, master.

Then on 19 May Rifleman and Nightingale were again in company when they captured Palmtract (or Palmtree).

On 14 September Joseph, Richardson, master, arrived at Leith. War with America having broken out the month before, Rifleman had intercepted and detained her as she was sailing from Archangel to America. Rifleman captured the American droit Joseph Ricketson on 23 August. (Note: A first-class share of His Majesty's grant of two-thirds of the proceeds was worth £332 14s 10d; a sixth-class share, that of an ordinary seaman, was worth £7 12s.)

Next, Rifleman captured Two Sisters, Garrett, master, as she was sailing from Bergen. Two Sisters arrived at Leith on 7 December. Two Sisters is almost surely Twende Sostre, which Riflemen captured on 1 December while in company with Snake.

On 23 March 1813 Pearce sailed Rifleman for the Leeward Islands station. Together with Sceptre she escorted seven troopships to Halifax, where they arrived on 1 June. The troops came from the 13th and the 64th Regiments of Foot.

On 14 September 1814 Rifleman picked up six escaped slaves in an open boat on the Chesapeake. Two days later she received one more from Acteon. On 27 September Rifleman delivered them to Halifax.

On 28 May 1814 Rifleman captured the American privateer Diomede off Sable Island. She mounted three 12-pounder and two 6-pounder guns and had a complement of 66 men. She was a schooner of 150 tons (bm), of Salem, and under the command of Captain J. Crowningshield. Rifleman sent Diomede into Halifax, where she arrived on 30 May. (Note: Both the prize court and Lloyd's List agree in stating that Diomede had three guns, and around 33-35 men suggesting that she may have thrown some guns overboard and may have had a large part of her crew away on prizes. Diomede had left Salem a month earlier, on 27 April. In the interim she had captured numerous vessels. She sent the ship Cod Hook, and her cargo of 700 hogsheads of salt, dry goods, crates, flour, bread, and iron, into Castine. Next she captured Upton, of Poole, a 270 ton (bm) ship sailing from Cork to Newfoundland with 104 persons aboard, many of whom were passengers. Diomede captured Upton, which was armed with 16 guns, after an action of 35 minutes during which Upton had one man killed and one wounded, and sent her into Wiscasset. As a prize ship, Upton captured Hero, of four guns and 20 men and made a cartel of her, presumably to dispose of Diomede's prisoners. On 23 May Diomede exchanged fire with HMS Prometheus, but made her escape. Diomede also captured, Mary, Moore, master, which had been sailing from Cork to Quebec. (HMS Martin later recaptured Mary on 27 May.) Diomede scuttled Harmony and Providence, which had been sailing from Maryport to Pugwash, Nova Scotia, and Miramichi. Diomede captured Traveller, Cronk, master, which had been sailing from Saint John, New Brunswick, to Quebec. Traveller was carrying 174 puncheons of rum, something that merited sending her into Thomastown. Lastly, Diomede had chased on shore Recovery, Perry, master, from St Andrews. On an earlier cruise Diomed captured the brig Friends, which was wrecked, the schooner William, which she sent into Savannah, and the schooner Hope, which she sent into Bristol.)

Rifleman recaptured Goodintent, Fox, master, which an American privateer had captured as Goodintent was sailing from Newfoundland to Miramichi, New Brunswick. Goodintent arrived at Bermuda around 14 August.

During her time on the New England blockade, "Rifleman had more punishments, with a higher number of lashes, than any other British ship in New England waters." In June 1814 Rifleman was under the command of Commander Henry Edward Napier, who sailed her for North America and the West Indies.

On 26 August 1814, a British squadron from Halifax moved to capture the Down East coastal town of Machias. The intention of the expedition was clearly to re-establish British title to Maine east of the Penobscot River, an area the British had renamed "New Ireland", and open the line of communications between Halifax and Quebec. The expedition was under the overall command of Sir John Sherbrooke and Rear Admiral Edward Griffith Colpoys controlled the naval elements. En route, the squadron fell in with Rifleman and learned that the USS Adams, commanded by Captain Charles Morris, was undergoing repairs at Hampden, on the Penobscot River. The British commanders then decided to capture Adams.

The first ships to go were Sylph, Dragon, Endymion, Bacchante, Peruvian, as well as some transports. Bulwark, Tenedos, Rifleman, and Pictou joined on the 31st. On the evening of 31 August, Sylph, Peruvian, and the transport Harmony, accompanied by a boat from Dragon, embarked marines, foot soldiers and a detachment from the Royal Artillery, to move up the Penobscot under the command of Captain Robert Barrie of Dragon. Their objective was Adams, of twenty-six 18-pounder guns, which had taken refuge some 27 miles up stream at Hampden, Maine. Here Adams had landed her guns and fortified a position on the bank with fifteen 18-pounders commanding the river. Moving up the river took two days, but eventually, after the Battle of Hampden, the British were able to capture the American defenders at Bangor, though not until after the Americans had burnt Adams. The British also captured 11 other ships and destroyed six. The British lost only one man killed, a sailor from Dragon, and had several soldiers wounded.

On 8 September, Bacchante, Rifleman, Tenedos, and Pictou captured the American schooner Fox at Machias, Maine. The British took the opportunity to confiscate a quantity of meat that they loaded on to Fox before they sent her to Saint John, New Brunswick.

Commander George Bennet Allen replaced Napier on 22 August 1815. (Napier declined accepting a piece of plate with which Nova Scotian merchants had wished to acknowledge his care in the conduct of convoys between the port of Saint John, New Brunswick, and Castine, Maine.)

Commander Houston Stewart replaced Allen a year later, in August 1816, at Jamaica.

On 11 May 1817, Rifleman captured a brigantine off Aux Cayes, whose crew reported that she had been the famous Charleston privateer schooner Saucy Jack. The brigantine was armed with one 12-pounder gun and one 12-pounder carronade. She had a crew of 18 men "of all colours and nations", and was loaded with plunder. She had been a prize to the Carthaginian privateer Creole, which had fitted her out to cruise. However, part of the crew had mutinied and been landed. Rifleman took the 18 prisoners on board, brought them to Kingston, Jamaica, and handed them over to the police as pirates. A British prize crew, under a lieutenant, sailed the brigantine for Port Royal.

In June Commander Robert Felix replaced Stewart. Three months later, in September, Commander Norwich Duff replaced Felix. He sailed Rifleman to Portsmouth where she was paid off on 11 August 1818.

Between January and July 1820 she underwent repairs. She was not fitted for sea, however, until April to July 1823. In April, Commander James Montague recommissioned her for the Halifax station. Commander William Webb replaced him there in July 1824.

In December 1826 Commander Frederick Thomas Michell was in command and sailed Rifleman to the Mediterranean. There he was attached to the commissariat of the French army in the Morea. Rifleman did not participate in the battle of Navarino, though Admiral Sir Edward Codrington had her surveil the port for a period prior to the battle.

In June 1829 Rifleman accompanied Blonde to Constantinople. Blonde was carrying the British ambassador Sir Robert Gordon to the Ottoman Court. Michell was promoted to post-captain 22 February 1830.

Codrington and Sir Pulteney Malcolm, the successive Commanders-in-Chief in the Mediterranean, and H.M. Ambassador at the Porte, recommended Michell to the Admiralty for promotion to post-captain for his services to them in the Mediterranean. Michell was promoted to post-captain 22 February 1830.

Rifleman was paid off in 1830. Thereafter she simply sat at Portsmouth.

Disposal: The "Principal Officers and Commissioners of His Majesty's Navy" offered "Rifleman, brig, 387 tons burthen", lying at Portsmouth, for sale on 21 January 1836. Rifleman sold on 21 January 1836 for £1,010.

== Whaler and merchantman ==
The shipbuilders and owners Messrs. Green, Wigram and Green purchased Rifleman. They almost rebuilt her and fitted her out as a whaler. Rifleman made three whaling voyages between 1837 and 1856.

1st whaling voyage (1837–1841): Captain Henry William Davis sailed Rifleman from Britain on 24 October 1837, bound for New Zealand. Her owners for this voyage were Green & Co.

Rifleman was at New Zealand on 26 February 1838, but clean, i.e., without yet having taken any whales. She was at the Bay of Islands on 27 February with 40 barrels. She was still at New Zealand on 24 August, and with 1000 barrels by 19 January 1839. She was at Whytootaichi (Aitutaki, Cook Islands), on 7 June. She was again at New Zealand in January 1841, but had reached the Cape of Good Hope on 23 January. She returned to Britain on 6 April 1841 with 500 casks.

2nd whaling voyage (1841–1845): Rifleman left Britain on 13 October 1841, still under Davis's command, and bound for the Pacific Ocean. On 19 March 1842 she was again at the Bay of Islands, having come there via Hobart. She was at Pleasant Island (Nauru) on 31 August, Otaheite (Tahiti) between 15 March to 9 April 1843, Payta on 22 August, Gorgona (possibly Gorgona Island, Colombia), in August, Payta again on 5 September, Huahine on 18 September, Talcahuana on 10 May 1844, and at the Marquesas Islands on 28 January 1845. Rifleman returned to Britain on 4 July 1845.

On 3 September 1845 Rifleman was offered for sale. The advertisement announcing the sale reported that she had been sheathed in yellow metal prior to her second whaling voyage.

Rifleman first appeared in Lloyd's Register (LR), in the supplementary (late) pages volume for 1845.

Year	Master	Owner	Trade	Source & notes
1845	Hammac	Crighton (Note: Benjamin Thomas Chrichton and later James Chrichton owned several whalers at the time.)	London–Sydney	LR

Voyage to Australia (1846–1848): In January 1846 Rifleman, of 402 tons (bm), Hammack, master, sailed for Sydney, Australia for the "Australia Line of Packet Ships". She arrived in Sydney on 3 June. She then sailed to Singapore and Manila, before returning to Sydney. She sailed for England on 26 October 1847 and arrived back in England on 2 March 1848. As she was returning, on 29 February 1848 she ran aground at Shoebury Nock, beneath the Nore. The fishing smack Catherine Mary offered her assistance, which Rifleman's master accepted. Catherine Mary remained until two steamers came up that were able to tow Rifleman off. Rifleman's cargo of tea, hemp, and tallow was valued at £16,000; she was also carrying a number of passengers. (Note: By some reports she was also carrying 40 tuns of sperm oil.) Catherine Mary submitted a claim for £125, which Rifleman's owners rejected. The matter went to court where the judge awarded the plaintiffs £200 on the grounds that small claims against valuable cargoes should be supported to encourage salvage efforts.

Rifleman was an unusual name for a merchant ship, but unfortunately, not a unique one. After returning from Australia, Rifleman may have made a voyage to Rouen before once again sailing to Australia.

Year	Master	Owner	Trade	Source & notes
1850	Hammack	Crichton	London–Sydney	LR; small repairs 1848

Voyage to Australia (1850–1851): Rifleman, Hammack, master, sailed for Sydney in February 1850. She arrived in July. On 26 August she sailed for Batavia, in ballast. She sailed from Singapore for London on 21 March 1851.

In 1852-1853 Rifleman apparently was not listed in LR. She did not reappear until 1854, by which time she had returned to whaling.

Year	Master	Owner	Trade	Source & notes
1854	J.Grosssmith	Sweeting (Note: George Waters Sweeting was a shipowner, including Adventure, a whaler that he owned with James Chrichton.)	London–South Seas	LR; small repairs 1848 & 1852

3rd whaling voyage (1852–1856): Rifleman, under the command of J. Grossman, left Britain for Timor on 28 December 1852. She was reported off Gaby Island on 10 September 1853 with 250 barrels. She returned to Britain on 1 September 1856.

== Fate ==
Rifleman was no longer listed in Lloyd's Register for 1857.
