= Sherbrooke (disambiguation) =

Sherbrooke is a city in Quebec, Canada.

Sherbrooke may also refer to:

== Places ==
Australia

- Sherbrooke, Victoria, a town
- Sherbrooke Forest, in Victoria
- Shire of Sherbrooke, a former local government area of Victoria
- Electoral district of Sherbrooke, New South Wales

Canada

- Related to the city of Sherbrooke, Quebec:
  - Sherbrooke Regional County Municipality, a former name of the now-defunct La Région-Sherbrookoise Regional County Municipality
  - Sherbrooke (federal electoral district), a federal electoral district
  - Sherbrooke (provincial electoral district), a provincial electoral district of Quebec
  - Sherbrooke (Province of Canada electoral district), former electoral district in the Province of Canada
  - Sherbrooke County (Province of Canada electoral district), former electoral district in the Province of Canada
  - Town of Sherbrooke, a past federal electoral district from 1867 to 1925
  - Sherbrooke Airport, Cookshire-Eaton
- Sherbrooke, Edmonton, a neighbourhood in Edmonton, Alberta
- Sherbrooke, Nova Scotia, a small rural community in Nova Scotia
- Sherbrooke Township, King's County, Nova Scotia; see Township (Nova Scotia)
- Sherbrooke Township, Ontario, in Haldimand County
- Sherbrooke, Prince Edward Island, a small settlement in Prince Edward Island
- Sherbrooke Street, a major road in Montreal, Quebec
  - Sherbrooke (Montreal Metro), a Montreal Metro station

United States

- Sherbrooke, North Dakota; a ghost town in Steele County
- Sherbrooke Township, Steele County, North Dakota
- Sherbrooke Manor, New Jersey; in Ewing Township

== People, characters, individuals ==
- John Coape Sherbrooke (1764–1830), British soldier and colonial administrator
- Robert Sherbrooke (1901–1972), English recipient of the Victoria Cross
- Robert Lowe, 1st Viscount Sherbrooke (1811–1892), British and Australian statesman
- Eric Sherbrooke Walker, MC (1887–1976), hotelier in Kenya
- John Sherbrooke Banks (1811–1857), East India Company; a British soldier

=== Individual animals ===
- Khaleesi Sherbrooke, a Great Pyrenees dog, ceremonial mayor of Cormorant Township, Becker County, Minnesota, USA

== Arts, entertainment, media ==
- Sherbrookes Trilogy, a 1970s novel series by Nicholas Delbanco
- Sherbrookes, a 1978 novel by Nicholas Delbanco
- Sherbrookes: Possession / Sherbrookes / Stillness, a 2011 compendium novel anthology by Nicholas Delbanco

== Military ==
=== Army ===
- Sherbrooke Hussars (also called "The Sherbrookes"), a Canadian army regiment
- Sherbrooke Fusilier Regiment (also called "The Sherbrookes"), a WW2 Canadian army regiment
  - Fusiliers de Sherbrooke
  - Sherbrooke Regiment

=== Navy ===
- HMCS Sherbrooke (K152), a ship of the Royal Canadian Navy during the Second World War
- Sir John Sherbrooke, one of two privateer vessels by the same name during the War of 1812
- Sherbrooke (Barbados), a War of 1812 privateer

== Schools ==
- Université de Sherbrooke (UdeS; French: Sherbrooke University), Sherbrooke, Quebec, Canada
- Cégep de Sherbrooke (Collège de Sherbrooke; French: Sherbrooke College), Sherbrooke, Quebec, Canada
- Séminaire de Sherbrooke (French: Seminary of Sherbrooke), Sherbrooke, Quebec, Canada

== Other uses ==
- 24 Sherbrooke, a municipal bus route in Montreal, Quebec, Canada
- Sherbrooke (typeface), a font

== See also ==
- North Sherbrooke Township, Ontario, Canada
- South Sherbrooke Township, Ontario, Canada
- Sherbrooke Lake (disambiguation)
