= Gerard Gosselin =

British general

General Gerard Gosselin DL
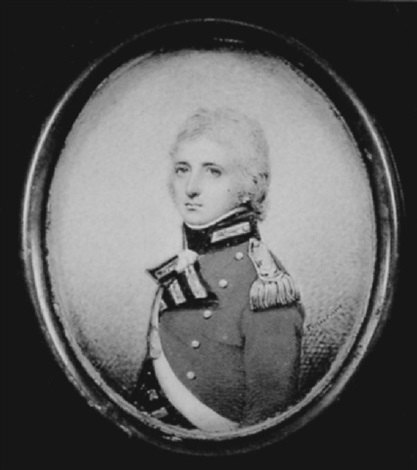
- Gerard Gosselin, c. 1810
- Born: 4 February 1769
- Died: 11 June 1859 (aged 90)
- Relatives: Thomas Le Marchant Gosselin (brother); Frances C. Fairman (granddaughter)
- Military career
- Allegiance: United Kingdom
- Branch: British Army
- Service years: 1787–1859
- Rank: General
- Commands: 130th Regiment of Foot; Brigades in Sicily, Genoa, and Canada; Genoa Garrison; Castine Garrison; Halifax Garrison
- Conflicts: French Revolutionary War; Napoleonic Wars; Siege of Genoa; War of 1812; Battle of Hampden
- Other work: Deputy lieutenant and magistrate for Kent

General Gerard Gosselin DL (4 February 1769 – 11 June 1859) was a British Army officer of the eighteenth and nineteenth centuries. After a short stint in the Marines, he joined the British Army in 1787 in the 34th Regiment of Foot. Having been promoted to lieutenant in 1791 he transferred to the 2nd Regiment of Life Guards in the same year, where he initially served as adjutant. Gosselin was promoted to captain in 1794 and almost immediately purchased his majority as well, transferring to the 130th Regiment of Foot. He travelled with this regiment to Jamaica where they served as garrison troops until returning home in 1796.

Gosselin subsequently served in a number of recruiting roles, becoming a lieutenant colonel in 1800, a colonel in 1810, and a major general in 1813. He was then sent to Sicily where he served on the staff of Lieutenant General Lord William Bentinck, and he commanded a brigade in the capture of Genoa in April 1814. Later in 1814 he was sent with his brigade to North America to serve in the War of 1812. Under the orders of Lieutenant General Sir John Coape Sherbrooke he then commanded the land component of an expedition into Maine, where in September they captured Castine and successfully fought the Battle of Hampden. Gosselin was made Provincial Governor of the area, a position in which he served until the end of the war in 1815. He briefly served as commander of the garrison at Halifax before returning to England in 1816. In retirement Gosselin became a magistrate and deputy lieutenant for Kent. Promoted to lieutenant general in 1825 and general in 1841, he died at his home near Faversham in 1859, aged ninety.

== Early life ==
Gerard Gosselin was born the third son of Colonel Joshua Gosselin and Martha née Le Marchant on 4 February 1769. The families of Gosselin and Le Marchant were long established in the Channel Islands. His second eldest brother was Admiral Thomas Le Marchant Gosselin. He had two younger brothers who served in the army and navy respectively; they both died while serving at Trinidad in 1803. Gosselin did not immediately join the British Army, instead choosing to join the Marines on 29 November 1780. He never officially served with that corps despite this, and was placed on half pay when they were reduced at the end of the American Revolutionary War in 1783. After four years out of service he joined the army as an ensign in the 34th Regiment of Foot in 1787.

== Army service ==
Gosselin was promoted to lieutenant on 6 January 1791. On 11 November of the same year he transferred from the 34th to the 2nd Regiment of Life Guards, where he became that regiment's adjutant. While serving in this role he became involved in a dispute with Captain John Bellenden Gawler over the latter being forced to leave the regiment, which resulted in a series of letters between the two being printed in the Morning Chronicle in 1793. On 6 June 1794 Gosselin was promoted to captain and given command of one of the 2nd's troops. He soon afterwards transferred out of the 2nd to instead command an independent company. Gosselin did so until 15 June when he purchased his majority in the 130th Regiment of Foot. The French Revolutionary War being underway, at the beginning of 1795 Gosselin sailed with that regiment to Jamaica, and upon arriving there he assumed command of the 130th, still a major. The regiment garrisoned Santo Domingo until 1796 when they were ordered home to England, and in 1798 they were further reduced, leaving Gosselin on half pay.

Gosselin was subsequently promoted to lieutenant colonel on 1 January 1800 and in the following year he was appointed Paymaster to the Birmingham Recruiting District. He served in this role until 1804 when he moved to become Inspecting Field Officer of the Waterford Recruiting District, and then in 1807 he took on the same role in the Carlisle district. Gosselin was promoted to colonel on 1 July 1810 and then by seniority became a major general on 4 June 1813. He was then sent to Sicily where he served as a staff officer to Lieutenant General Lord William Bentinck. Bentinck attacked Genoa on 28 February 1814 and Gosselin took part in the expedition as commander of a brigade, subsequently serving as Commandant of Genoa after the city surrendered on 18 April. Genoa was evacuated by the British in December, but by this time Gosselin had left the Mediterranean.

=== Halifax-Castine Expedition ===
With the Napoleonic Wars ending but the War of 1812 still ongoing, Gosselin was ordered to take the brigade he commanded at Genoa to America. He sailed to Halifax, breaking his journey at Bermuda. Also at Bermuda at this time was Major General Robert Ross, who was preparing to lead the force that would burn Washington on 24 August. Orders had been sent that Ross could take one of Gosselin's regiments, which would end up being the 21st Regiment of Foot, for his own force, but these were temporarily lost. In the confusion of what the orders actually were, Gosselin was almost given command of Ross' force as the senior general, but the orders were found before this could happen and he continued to Halifax.

Here Gosselin joined with the forces of Lieutenant General Sir John Coape Sherbrooke. Sherbrooke then began an expedition south to the Penobscot River and Maine, as part of which Gosselin was the primary commander of the land forces. The expedition was launched so that Britain could secure the New England trade and to ensure that the province could not provide a launching platform for American attacks into Canada itself. They left Halifax for Maine on 26 August 1814. Gosselin had under his command 3–4,000 men, which included the First Company of the Royal Artillery, two rifle companies of the 60th Regiment of Foot, and other units of the 29th, 62nd, and 98th regiments. (Note: Also recorded as 2,500 men.)

Gosselin's force, embarked in troopships and with a large escort, arriving off Castine on 1 September. The town was protected by a small garrisoned fort, but upon seeing the size of the force against him the American officer in charge blew up the fort and retreated with his 140 men. Gosselin then marched in and peacefully secured Castine. The next day Gosselin set out with 700 men of the 29th to Belfast, which they captured without a gun being fired. A part of Gosselin's force then moved to Hampden on 3 September, where the American frigate USS Adams was holed up. The commander of Adams, Captain Charles Morris, had drawn up a force of militia and taken the guns off his ship to form batteries ashore. Gosselin's force vastly outnumbered the American defenders, and Morris was forced to spike his guns and retreat after his militia force dissipated, with there being less than ten casualties in total on both sides in the Battle of Hampden. 1,200 American militiamen were dispersed by the attack and twenty guns from Adams were captured, although the ship herself was burned by Morris. Hampden and the nearby Bangor, having shown hostile unlike Castine and Belfast, were sacked by the British forces before Gosselin then withdrew to Castine on 6 September.

The town became the headquarters of the British in Maine, and on 12 September Sherbrooke left to attack Machias before going back to Canada. Gosselin was given command of the Castine Garrison as Provincial Governor of the newly captured area, working with Rear Admiral David Milne. Much effort was put into pacifying the territory, and Gosselin allowed the Americans to continue with their own judicial system and trade, as long as it was self-contained or with British controlled territories. Gosselin also prepared defences against any counter attack to retake Castine, rebuilding the destroyed fort and accompanying half-moon redoubt and adding several new defensive features. He was well-liked during his "mild and humane" tenure in Castine, and when the British left the occupied territory on 26 April 1815 at the end of the war, Gosselin took with him the good regard of the Americans but also £11,000 of funds gained through his control of customs.

=== Post-war life ===
Gosselin was congratulated by the Prince Regent for his services in the war. After leaving Castine Gosselin returned to Canada, becoming commander of the Halifax Garrison. He served as such until September 1816 when reforms in the army meant that his position would no longer be held by a major general, and he left for England. This was his last service in the army. In retirement he became a member of the Consolidated Board of General Officers, and was also a magistrate and deputy lieutenant for Kent. He continued to be promoted by seniority, becoming a lieutenant general on 27 May 1825 and a general on 23 November 1841. He died on 11 June 1859, aged ninety, at his house at Mount Ospringe, Faversham, Kent.

== Family ==
Gosselin married Christian Lipyeatt, the daughter of Bonick Lipyeatt of Faversham, on 21 December 1791. Together they had two sons and two daughters:

- Gerard Lipyeatt Gosselin (b. 9 May 1795)
- Captain George Gosselin (b. 10 June 1797), army officer, 29th Regiment of Foot
- Christian Gosselin (b. 18 May 1798), married Samuel Creed Fairman on 28 January 1836 and had issue Frances C. Fairman
- Caroline Gosselin (b 4 September 1799), died unmarried

His first wife having predeceased him, Gosselin married Priscilla Dimsdale, the daughter of J. Dimsdale, in 1835. They had no children.
