= Sir John Sherbrooke =

At least four Canadian brigs, three of them bearing letters of marque, bore the name Sir John Sherbrooke or Sherbrooke during the War of 1812. All were named after Sir John Coape Sherbrooke, governor of Nova Scotia.

- Sir John Sherbroke (1804 ship) was built in Nova Scotia. She wrecked in 1816 and her crew made off with 56,000 dollars that she was carrying.
- Sir John Sherbrooke (Halifax) was the most famous privateer by this name. A brig of 278 tons burthen, she was commissioned in 1813. An American privateer captured and burned her in 1814.
- Sir John Sherbrooke (Saint John) was a brig of 187 tons burthen, ten guns and thirty men. She was commissioned 27 November 1812. The American privateer Saucy Jack captured her on 30 October 1813.
- Sherbrooke (Barbados) was a brig of 205 tons, eleven guns, commissioned 27 August 1814 and confiscated in April 1815.

== See also ==
- HMCS Sherbrooke
- Sherbrooke (disambiguation)
