= Battle of Hampden =

1814 battle of the War of 1812

Coordinates: 44.7365°N 68.8373°W

- Part of the War of 1812
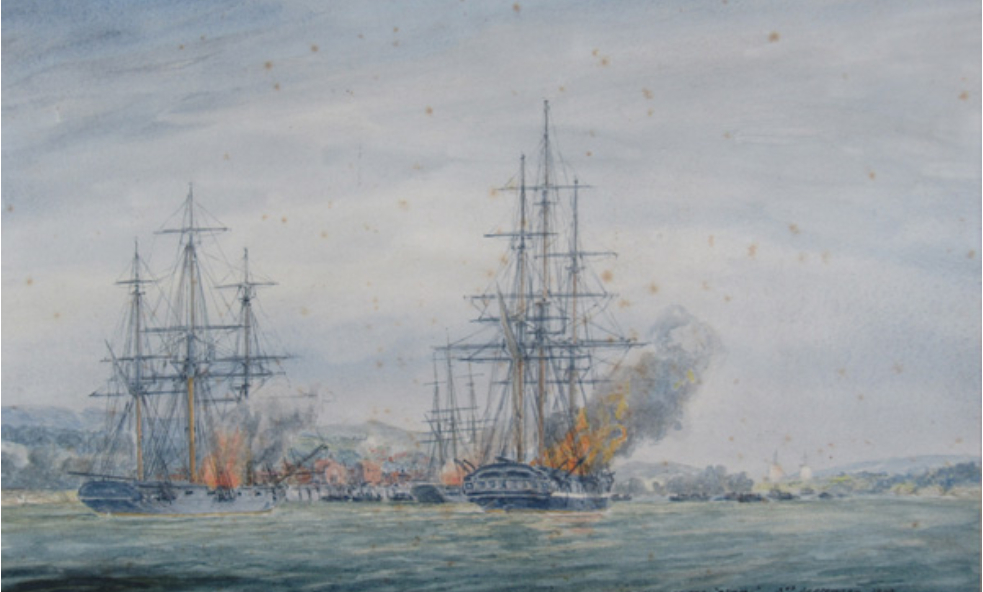
- The USS Adams being scuttled during the battle on September 3, 1814
Date	September 3, 1814
Location	Hampden, Maine
Result	British victory

Belligerents
United Kingdom	United States

Commanders and leaders
Robert Barrie; John Coape Sherbrooke	Charles Morris

Strength
3 warships 2 support ships 750	1 warship 725

Casualties and losses
2 killed 8 wounded 1 missing	12–40 killed, wounded or missing 70 captured 1 frigate scuttled

The Battle of Hampden was an action in the British campaign to conquer present-day Maine and remake it into the colony of New Ireland during the War of 1812. Sir John Sherbrooke led a British force from Halifax, Nova Scotia, to establish New Ireland, which lasted until the end of the war, eight months later. Revenues from the short-lived colony funded a military library in Halifax and the Dalhousie College.

The subsequent retirement of the British expeditionary force from its base in Castine to Nova Scotia ensured that eastern Maine would remain a part of the United States. Lingering local feelings of vulnerability, however, would help fuel the post-war movement for statehood for what was then a part of Massachusetts, formally the District of Maine. The withdrawal of the British after the ratification of the Treaty of Ghent represented the end of two centuries of violent contest over Maine.

== Background ==
On August 26, 1814, a British squadron from the Royal Navy base at Halifax moved to capture the Down East coastal town of Machias. The force consisted of five warships: HMS Dragon (74), HMS Endymion (40), HMS Bacchante (38), HMS Sylph (18), a large tender, and ten transports carrying some 3,000 British regulars (elements of the 29th, 60th, 62nd, and 98th regiments and a company of Royal Artillery). The expedition was under the overall command of Lieutenant-general Sir John Coape Sherbrooke, who was then the lieutenant governor of Nova Scotia. Major-general Gerard Gosselin commanded the army and Rear-admiral Edward Griffith Colpoys controlled the naval elements.

Lieutenant-general Sir John Sherbrooke, who commanded the British expedition to Maine

The intention of the expedition was clearly to re-establish British title to Maine east of the Penobscot River, an area the British had renamed "New Ireland", and open the line of communications between Halifax and Quebec. Carving off "New Ireland" from New England had been a goal of the British government and the colonies of New Brunswick and Nova Scotia ("New Scotland") since British Brigadier General Francis McLean conquered Maine during the American Revolution. En route, the squadron fell in with HMS Rifleman (18), and learned that the USS Adams (28), commanded by Captain Charles Morris, was undergoing repairs at Hampden, on the Penobscot River. Sherbrooke changed his plan and headed for Castine at the mouth of the Penobscot. He rendezvoused off Matinicus Island and added HMS Bulwark (74), HMS Tenedos (38), HMS Peruvian (18), and the schooner (18) and HM Schooner HMS Pictou (14) to his force.

The complete force entered the cove at Castine on September 1. The local militia melted away at the sight and a 28-man contingent from the U.S. Army under Lieutenant Andrew Lewis of the 40th U.S. Infantry spiked their four 24-pounders, blew up their magazine and withdrew to the north trailing a pair of field pieces. As the first order of business, Sherbrooke and Griffith issued a proclamation assuring the populace if they remained quiet, pursued their usual affairs and surrendered all weaponry, they would be protected as British subjects. Moreover, the British would pay fair prices for all goods and services provided. Next, Gosselin crossed the bay with most of the 29th to occupy Belfast and protect the left flank of the major operation to follow. Locals did not challenge the occupation, although some 1,200 militiamen gathered three miles outside Belfast to await developments.

== Expedition up the Penobscot River ==
Griffith assigned RN Captain Robert Barrie the task of going after the Adams. Barrie proceeded up the Penobscot with the Dragon, Sylph, Peruvian, the transport Harmony and a prize-tender. The ships carried an armed contingent of some 750 men drawn from the four participating regiments, the artillery company, and some Royal Marines. During the war, Barrie was one of the few British officers in America to acquire a loathsome reputation, which he was about to reinforce.

== Battle of Hampden ==
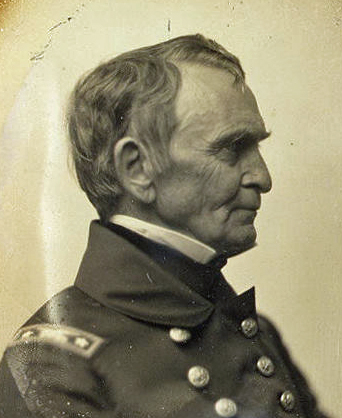
Captain Charles Morris (pictured c. 1850) commanded the USS Adams during the battle.

When Morris entered the river late in August he moved past Buckstown (now Bucksport, Maine) and anchored at the mouth of the Souadabscook Stream in Hampden on the west bank of the Penobscot some 30 miles inland. Anticipating an attack, he placed nine of the ship's guns in battery on a nearby hill and fourteen on the wharf next to his crippled ship. Morris, commanding a crew of 150, called for help from Brigadier General John Blake, commander of the Eastern Militia at Brewer. Blake responded with some 550 militiamen and formed the center of a defensive line running along a ridge facing south, towards Castine. Lieutenant Lewis showed up with his two dozen or so regulars and two field pieces. Adding a carronade, he went in line to the west and commanded the north-south road, the expected route of British attackers.

Late on September 2, Barrie landed his force at Bald Hill Cove three miles below Hampden and waited for morning. Early on September 3, in rain and fog, the British moved on Hampden, led by Lt. Colonel Henry John. Skirmishers met with resistance at Pitcher's Brook (now Reeds Brook), primarily from the guns directed by Lewis, but John sent reinforcements and the British stormed across the bridge. In short order, the full force was in position to continue against the American defensive line on the hill. Upon spotting the advancing British troops, the defenders panicked; the American center broke and fled to the woods toward Bangor. Morris on the left and Lewis on the right found themselves in untenable positions. About to be overrun, Morris spiked his guns and ignited a train leading to the Adams. With colors flying, the ship blew up before the attackers could prevent her from being destroyed. Lewis likewise spiked his guns and withdrew to the north. Morris and his navy band made it to Bangor, crossed west through rugged country to the Kennebec River, and around September 9 arrived at their base in Portsmouth, New Hampshire. After two weeks, every sailor reported, not a man missing, a source of great satisfaction for Morris.

At this point, Barrie detailed 200 men to take control of Hampden while he and the balance of his force pursued the Americans in the direction of Bangor. Eighty prominent men of the Hampden area spent a night as prisoners. Most were paroled the next day.

== Occupation of Bangor and Hampden ==
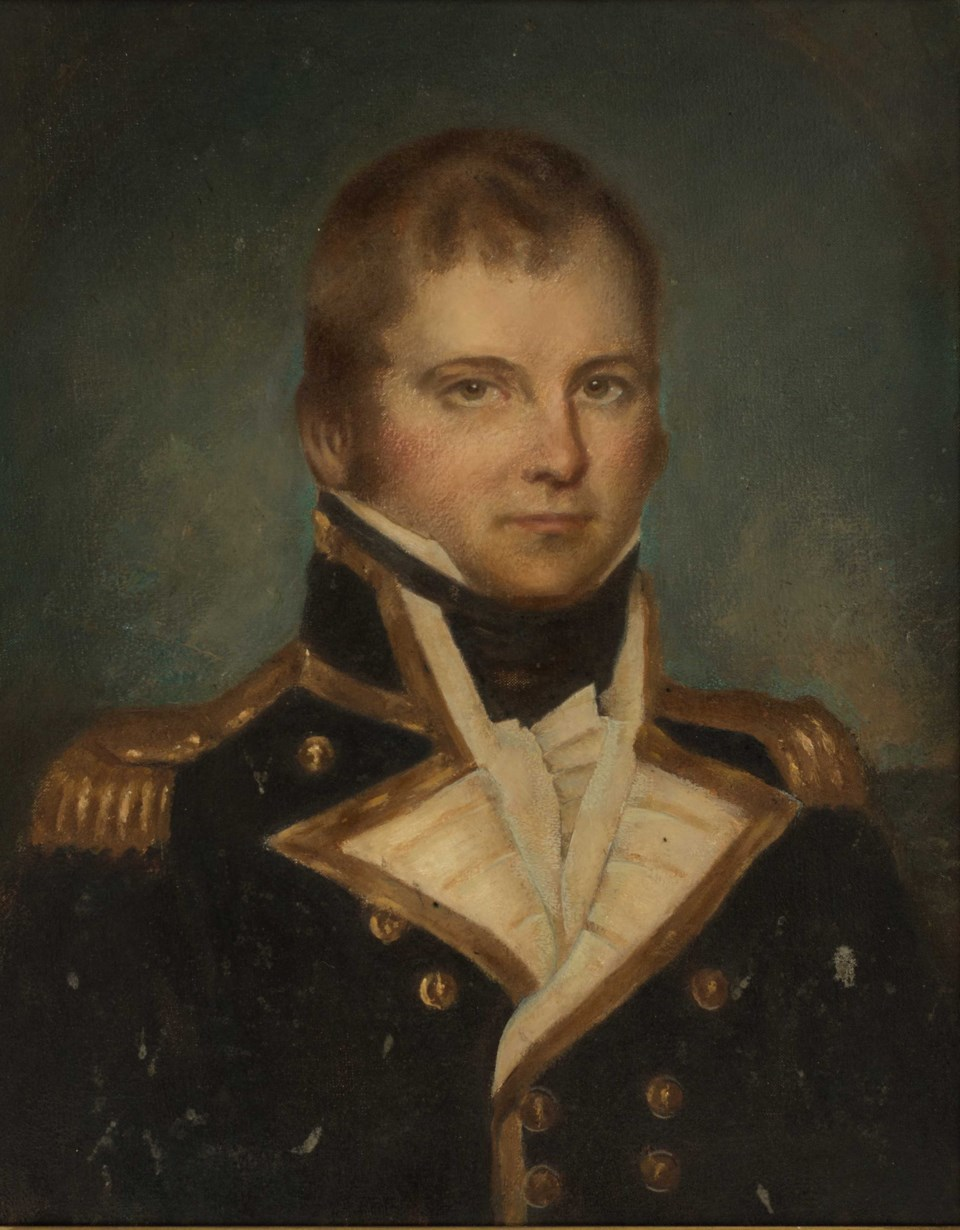
Miniature of Captain Robert Barrie

The British entered Bangor on September 5 at midday, being greeted by several white flags placed by the town's residents. Barrie demanded the residents of Bangor provide provisions and quarters for his troops, which were readily agreed to "since the commodore, who was a churlish, brutish monster, threatened to let loose his men and burn the town if the inhabitants did not use greater exertion to feed his men." The occupational troops, who were quartered in the Bangor courthouse, two schools, and two large dwellings, were forbidden by Barrie from drinking alcohol. However, the troops looted stores and houses in South Bangor, and some of them acquired a quantity of brandy. Barrie subsequently ordered an officer to destroy all stocks of liquor in the town. A newspaper correspondent subsequently wrote that "We are alive this morning, but such scenes I hope not to witness again. The enemy's Soldiery... have emptied all the stores and many dwelling houses - they break windows, and crockery, and destroy every-thing they cannot move."

During the night, the British burnt 14 American merchantmen harbored at Bangor and nearby Brewer. Before any more vessels were burnt, the town's selectmen, fearing that the burnings would lead to a general conflagration, offered Barrie a $30,000 bond and agreed to complete four local ships on the stocks and deliver them to Castine. Barrie agreed, and also seized the remaining six ships: a packet boat, four schooners and a smaller boat, sending them down the river. Prior to his departure from Bangor on 6 September, Barrie paroled 191 American prisoners of war who were local residents, including Blake, after making them sign a pledge not to take up arms against Britain. Bangor's selectmen estimated that the thirty-hour occupation led to $45,000 worth of damages.

Barrie's forces also occupied Hampden, looting it as well. A local church was vandalized, and the merchant ship Victory and privateer Commodore Decatur taken as prizes by the British. A delegation of local residents of Hampden approached Barrie and requested that their personal property be spared, appealing to his "humanity". He replied by stating: "Humanity! I have none for you. My business is to burn, sink, and destroy. Your town is taken by storm. By the rules of war we ought to lay your village in ashes, and put its inhabitants to the sword! But I will spare your lives, though I mean to burn your houses!" Though the British did not burn any houses, several Hampden residents went to Castine and complained about Barrie's behavior to Sherbrooke, who sent instructions to spare private property except in extreme circumstances. Barrie secured a $14,000 bond from town residents on several incomplete vessels on the stocks in Hampden, which required the ships when complete to be delivered to Castine by November 1. Hampden authorities ultimately estimated the value of the town's losses at $44,000. The British then moved south to Frankfort, Maine and demanded a large sum of livestock and all of the settlement's arms and ammunition. Frankfort's residents were slow to comply and before he moved along on September 7, Barrie promised to return and make the town pay for its delays. However, he ultimately did not make good on this threat, and except for some ineffective American sniper attacks against the British as they passed through Prospect, Maine, the battle was at an end.

== Casualties ==
The British Army loss in the battle was 1 enlisted man killed, 1 officer and 7 enlisted men wounded and 1 enlisted man missing. Four of the casualties were from the 29th Regiment, two from the 62nd Regiment and 4 from the 98th Regiment. The Royal Navy reported 1 sailor from HMS Dragon killed.

American casualties were low, but sources are conflicting. Williamson gives 1 militiaman killed and 11 wounded, with at least two civilians killed by accident. Including the wounded, 84 Americans were taken prisoner. Williamson's data may reflect only the losses to the Hampden militia companies. Captain Barrie could form no estimate, but noted upwards of 30 lying wounded in the woods. Lt. Col. John states he had no correct number, but reported 30 to 40 killed, wounded or missing. Militia leaders could not confirm how many men actually reported for duty. A list for pay purposes was finally produced but is missing entire companies and states no casualties except for one "Tobias Oakman - killed" (the basis for the "1 killed" that Williamson repeated). Claims by citizens for various compensations were filed for numerous years after the battle without a final tally or surviving documentation.

== British evacuation of Castine ==
After the signing of the Treaty of Ghent, the peace treaty which ended the War of 1812, British forces evacuated Castine.

Sherbrooke declared "New Ireland" (Eastern Maine) a province of British North America (Canada) and left General Gosselin in Castine to govern it. For the next 8 months (from the fall of 1814 to the spring of 1815), the Penobscot River was essentially an international boundary. That Hampden and Bangor were on the wrong (American) side might have contributed to their rough treatment.

With the signing of the Treaty of Ghent in December 1814, however, the British claim to Maine was effectively surrendered. The British evacuated Castine on April 25, 1815, and the pre-war boundary was restored. The final boundary between the inland, wooded portion of Maine and Canada would remain open to dispute until the Webster-Ashburton Treaty of 1842.

== Aftermath ==
Local memory of this humiliation contributed to subsequent anti-British feeling in Eastern Maine, which would find outlet again in the Aroostook War of 1838-1839. It would also contribute to the postwar movement for Maine's statehood since Massachusetts had failed to protect the region and to the building of a large, expensive granite fort (Fort Knox) at the mouth of the Penobscot River starting in the 1840s.

General Blake and two other officers (Lt. Col. Andrew Grant of Hampden and Maj. Joshua Chamberlain of Brewer, grandfather of the later Civil War general) were court-martialed in Bangor in 1816 for their part in the defeat. Blake and Chamberlain were both exonerated, but Grant was cashiered.

The elderly Blake was court-martialled first and cleared of charges. He then brought charges against his two subordinates, perhaps in a move to clear his name. Grant was found guilty of actions unbecoming an officer before the enemy and banned from being re-elected as a militia officer. One report claims that he ran from battle and changed out of his uniform into civilian clothes before he was eventually captured and identified.
