= HMS Dragon (1798) =

74-gun third rate ship of the line of the Royal Navy

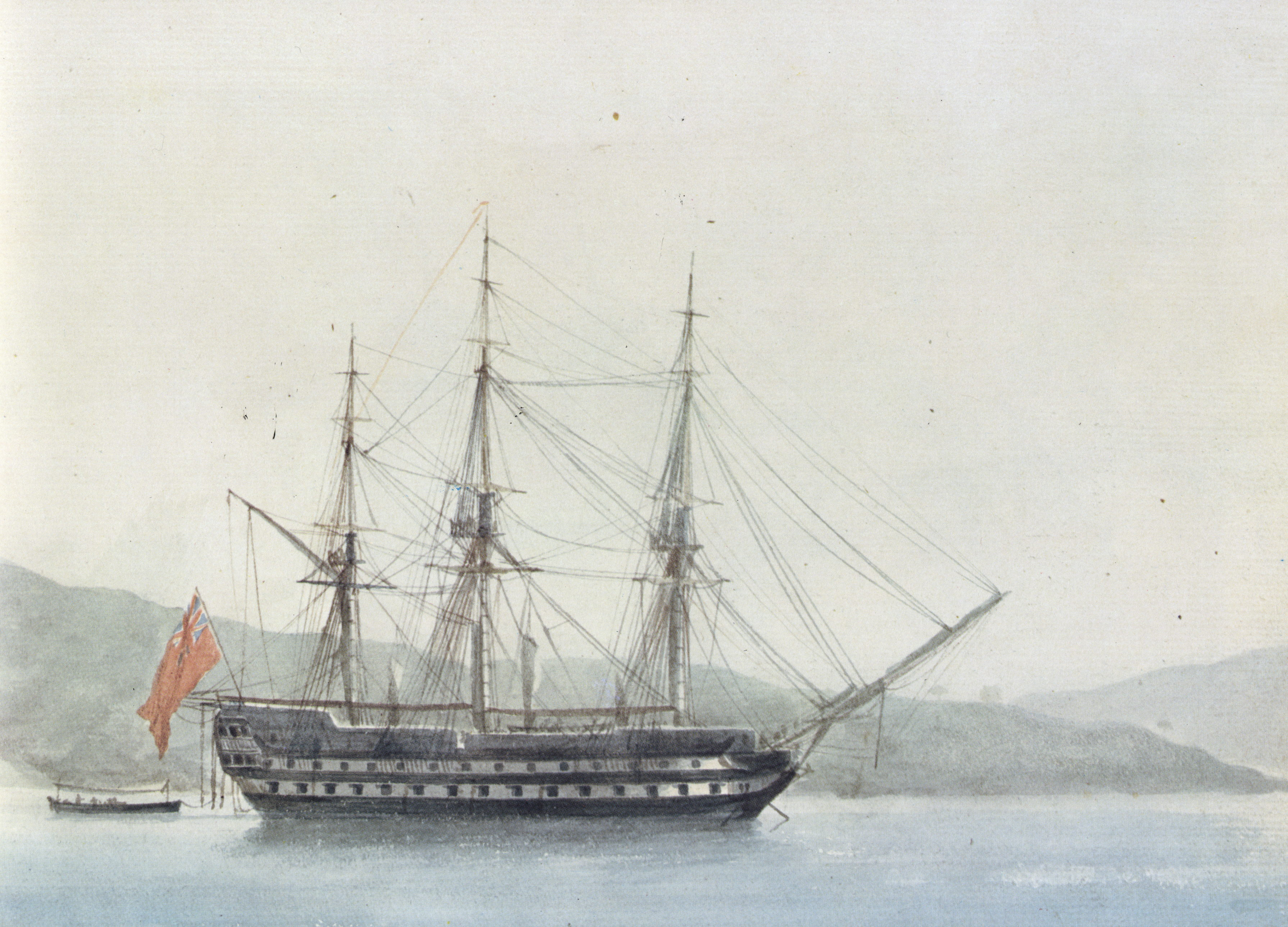
- HMS Dragon by Antoine Roux

History

Great Britain
- Name: HMS Dragon
- Ordered: 30 April 1795
- Builder: Wells, Rotherhithe
- Laid down: August 1795
- Launched: 2 April 1798
- Renamed: HMS Fame in 1842
- Honours and awards: Participated in: Battle of Cape Finisterre; Battle of Hampden; Battle of Fort Peter; Naval General Service Medal with clasp "Egypt"
- Fate: Broken up, 1850

General characteristics
- Class & type: 74-gun third rate ship of the line
- Tons burthen: 1814 74/95 (bm)
- Length: 178 ft (54.3 m) (gundeck)
- Beam: 48 ft 3 in (14.7 m)
- Depth of hold: 20 ft 6 in (6.2 m)
- Propulsion: Sails
- Armament: Gundeck: 28 × 32-pounder guns; Upper gundeck: 28 × 18-pounder guns; QD: 14 × 9-pounder guns; Fc: 4 × 9-pounder guns

HMS Dragon was a 74-gun third rate ship of the line of the Royal Navy, launched on 2 April 1798 at Rotherhithe. She was designed by Sir William Rule, and was the only ship built to her draught.

== French Revolutionary Wars ==
In 1799, she sailed to the Mediterranean as part of a squadron under Sir Charles Cotton. In February 1801 she was part of a squadron under Sir John Warren off Cadiz.

Because Dragon served in the navy's Egyptian campaign between 8 March 1801 and 2 September, her officers and crew qualified for the clasp "Egypt" to the Naval General Service Medal that the Admiralty issued in 1847 to all surviving claimants.

On 7 September 1800, under command of Captain George Campbell, she made contact with USS George Washington a little north of Gibraltar.

21 July 1802 she was at Gibraltar to prevent Algerian corsairs from passing through the Straits.

== Napoleonic Wars ==
In April 1803, Dragon was sailing from Gibraltar to Britain in company with Alligator and the store ship Prevoyante when they sighted two French ships of the line off Cape St. Vincent. The French ships veered off rather than engage the British vessels.

On 18 June 1803, Dragon and Endymion captured the French naval 12-gun brig Colombe. Colombe was copper-bottomed and pierced for 16 guns. She had a crew of 65 men under the command of lieutenant de vaisseau Caro. Colombe had been returning from Martinique and was bound for Brest when the British captured her off Ouessant. The Royal Navy took her into service as HMS Colombe.

In 1805, Dragon took part in Admiral Robert Calder's action at the Battle of Cape Finisterre.

From 1806 to 1808, Dragon she served in the Channel Squadron. On 17 February 1806, she ran aground on the Île de Ré, Finistère, France. She was later refloated, repaired and returned to service. In September 1810 she commissioned as the flagship of Sir Francis Laforey and she sailed for the Leeward Islands in October 1810.

On 18 October 1810, Dragon was in Hamoaze. There she ran into and dismasted the brig Eliza Ann, Rees, master, which had been sailing from Neath to London.

== War of 1812 ==
Dragon participated in the War of 1812, under the command of Robert Barrie, and took part in a number of engagements. She also captured a number of vessels.

On 12 September 1812, Dragon captured Anna Maria. (Note: A first-class share was worth £186 9s 12d; a sixth-class share, that of an ordinary seaman, was worth 14s 11d.)

On 20 or 22 December, Dragon destroyed the American privateer Tartar, of ten guns and 47 men. (Note: Head money was finally paid in June 1829. A first-class share of the head money was worth £72 18s 6½d; a sixth-class share was worth 4s 2½d.)

In August 1814, Dragon took part in an expedition up the Penobscot River in Maine. The first ships to go were Sylph, Dragon, Endymion, Bacchante, Peruvian, as well as some transports. Bulwark, Tenedos, Rifleman, and Pictou joined on the 31st. On the evening of 31 August, Sylph, Peruvian, and the transport Harmony, accompanied by a boat from Dragon, embarked marines, foot soldiers and a detachment from the Royal Artillery, to move up the Penobscot under the command of Captain Robert Barrie of Dragon. The objective was the American frigate Adams, of twenty-six 18-pounder guns, which had taken refuge some 27 miles up stream at Hampden, Maine. Here Adams had landed her guns and fortified a position on the bank with fifteen 18-pounders commanding the river. Moving up the river took two days, but eventually, after the Battle of Hampden, the British were able to capture the American defenders at Bangor, though not until after the Americans had burnt the Adams. The British also captured 11 other ships and destroyed six. The British lost only one man killed, a sailor from Dragon, and had several soldiers wounded.

In January 1815, Dragon was the flagship for Admiral Sir George Cockburn at the Battle of Fort Peter and the capture of St. Marys, Georgia. HMS Erebus left Amelia Island on 15 March, and Dragon was to leave on 16 March 1815. She arrived at Bermuda on 29 March 1815. After leaving Bermuda, she arrived at Plymouth on 6 May.

== Fate ==
Dragon was on harbour service in 1824, becoming a Marine barracks ship at Portland in 1829. She was renamed HMS Fame in 1842. She was broken up in 1850.
