= Fort Sullivan (Maine) =

- U.S. National Register of Historic Places
- U.S. Historic district
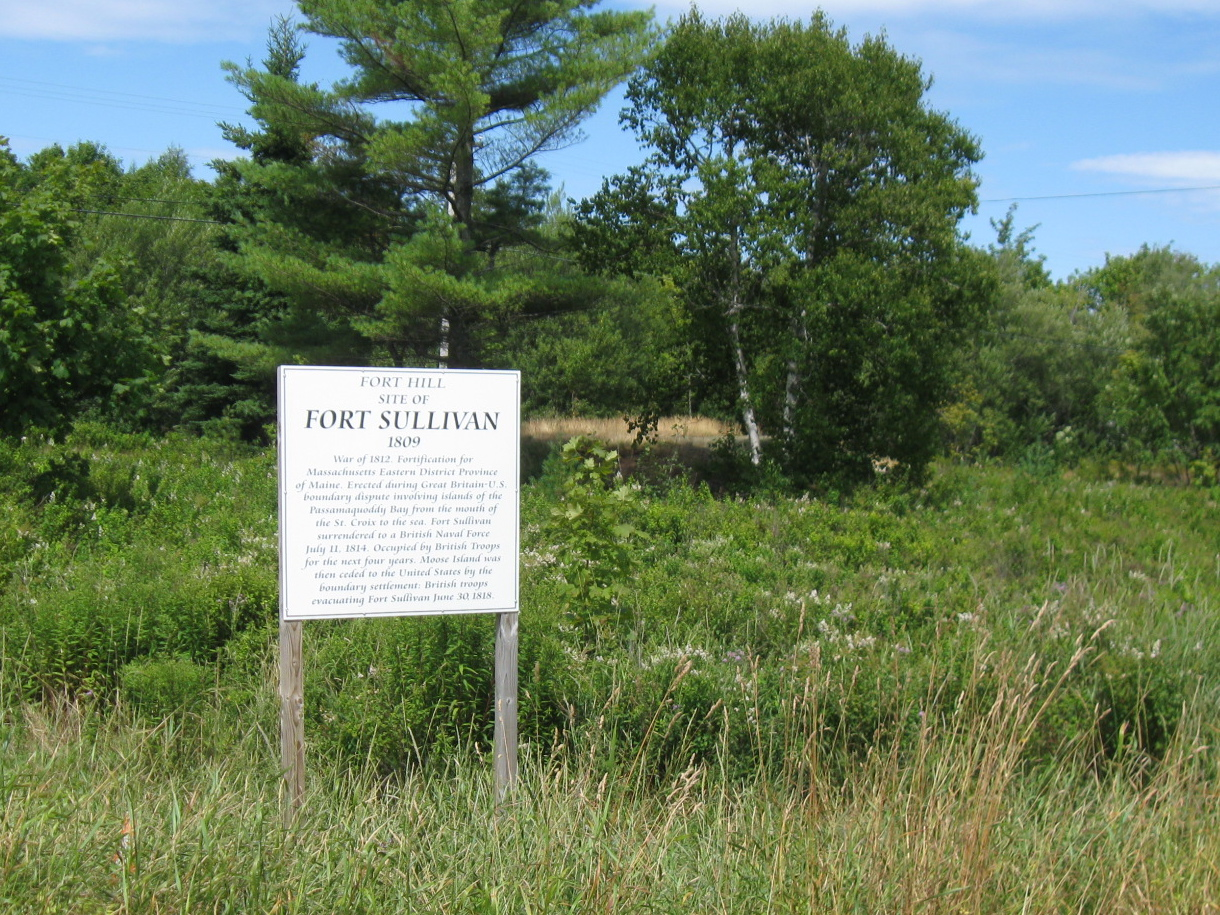

- Location within Maine Location within the United States
- Location: Moose Island; barracks, 74 Washington St., Eastport, Maine
- Coordinates: 44°54′27″N 66°59′19″W
- Area: 1.8 acres (0.73 ha)
- Built: 1808
- NRHP reference No.: 70000081
- Added to NRHP: January 26, 1970

Fort Sullivan (briefly Fort Sherbrooke) was a 19th-century military fortification in Eastport, Maine. It lay opposite New Brunswick, Canada, and served as an important coastal defense for the easternmost United States of America during the 19th century. As part of the establishment of New Ireland during the War of 1812, British Commodore Sir Thomas Hardy, 1st Baronet conquered the fort in 1814 and renamed it Fort Sherbrooke after John Coape Sherbrooke, the Governor of Nova Scotia.

== Construction ==
In 1808, the United States Army decided to build a fort in Eastport, Massachusetts (now Maine), to protect against possible threats from Britain and other European powers then engaged in warfare. In 1808 or 1809, Major Lemuel Trescott oversaw the construction of the garrison atop Clark's Hill in the village. The fort contained a four-gun circular earthwork, a wooden blockhouse, and barracks. Fort Sullivan reportedly took its name circa March 1813.

== British control ==
John Coape Sherbrooke, who re-established New Ireland in 1814

During the War of 1812, in an effort to establish New Ireland, the British forced the American garrison to surrender Fort Sullivan to a British fleet under command of Commodore Sir Thomas Hardy, 1st Baronet, on 11 July 1814. British naval forces ultimately took control over the entire coast east of Penobscot Bay, renaming it New Ireland. Even after the war, Britain claimed that Moose Island, Maine, (including Fort Sullivan and the entire village of Eastport) lay on the British side of the border separating United States of America from their loyal colony of New Brunswick and so left eight hundred troops in the fort, which they renamed Fort Sherbrooke after John Coape Sherbrooke, to hold the territory. The British demanded that the inhabitants of Eastport take oaths of allegiance to their crown; some complied, others evaded, and many removed to undisputed American territory. Through negotiations with the British in 1817, Americans renounced their claims to larger islands farther east and regained control over Eastport on 30 June 1818.

Two active battalions of the Regular Army (1-5 Inf and 2-5 Inf) perpetuate the lineage of the old 40th Infantry Regiment, which was on garrison duty at Fort Sullivan when it was captured by the British.

== Coastal fort ==
The post surgeon began meteorological observations at the fort in 1822.

The Army stationed officer Nathaniel Dana in the 1st U.S. Artillery at Fort Sullivan on 15 April 1822, when and where his wife bore his son, future major general Napoleon Jackson Tecumseh Dana.

First Lieutenant George Sears Greene, who would serve as a major general in the Union Army during the American Civil War and was noted for his defense of Culp's Hill at the Battle of Gettysburg, commanded Fort Sullivan from 1831 until 1835. Tragically, Greene's wife and three children died of tuberculosis during his assignment to Fort Sullivan.

The fort had a small garrison until the late 1830s, when disputes over the border with New Brunswick in northern Maine threatened to break out into war. The Webster–Ashburton Treaty of 1842 settled the boundary dispute.

During American Civil War, the Army constructed earthwork batteries in the area. Company C of the Maine Coast Guard mustered in at Eastport on 16 May 1864, stationed at Fort Sullivan, and mustered out 6 September 1865, under Captain Thomas P. Hutchinson.

== Decommissioning ==
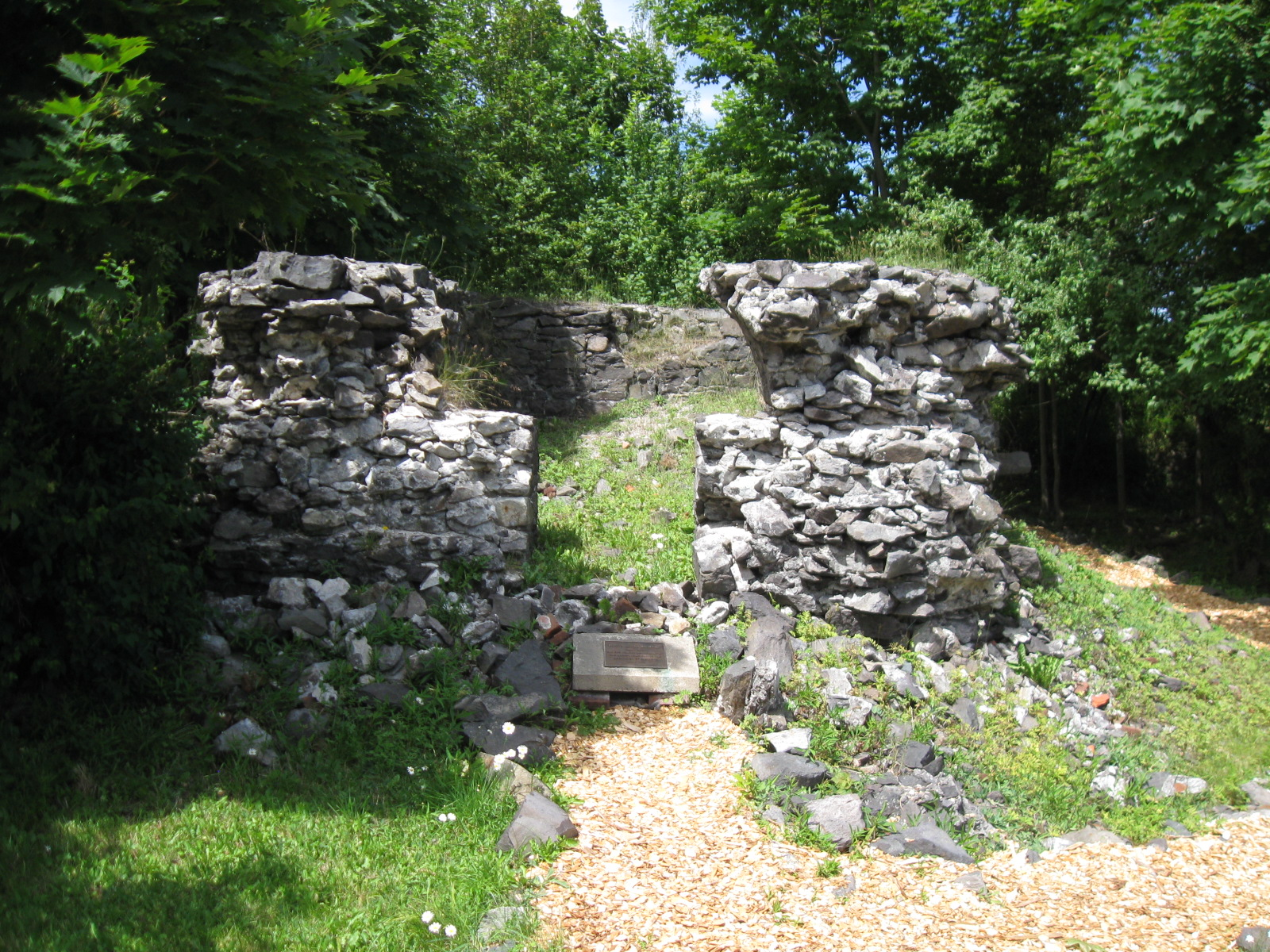
Remnants of powder magazine built during British occupation, 1814-18

In 1873, the Army ceased using and occupying Fort Sullivan. In 1877, the government sold the property at Fort Sullivan. The new owners moved the northernmost barracks quarters to its present location at 74 Washington Street. Other parts of the fort collapsed over time. Ruins of an old powder magazine still exist off McKinley Street, and are the only surviving in situ remains of the fort.

== Barracks Museum ==
The Border Historical Society now owns and operates one of the remaining early 19th century officers quarters as the Barracks Museum, a site listed in National Register of Historic Places listings in Washington County, Maine. Exhibits include the history of Fort Sullivan, the area sardine and ground fishing industries, local history and genealogy. The museum is open in July and August.

== See also ==
- National Register of Historic Places listings in Washington County, Maine
