= Maister (1802 ship) =

British ship

History

United Kingdom
- Name: Maister
- Launched: 1802, Kingston upon Hull
- Fate: Wrecked 13 December 1822

General characteristics
- Tons burthen: 369 (bm)
- Armament: 1804:8 × 18-pounder carronades; 1809:2 × 9-pounder guns + 8 × 18-pounder carronades

Maister (or Maisters) was launched in 1802 at Hull. She initially sailed to the Baltic, but then became a government transport until the end of the Napoleonic Wars. She twice sailed to India under a licence from the British East India Company (EIC). In her career she suffered at least three maritime mishaps before she was wrecked on 13 December 1822.

== Career ==
Maister first appeared in Lloyd's Register (LR) in 1802.

Year	Master	Owner	Trade	Source
1802	R.Cowham	Maister & Co.	Hull–Petersburg	LR

On 18 August 1802 Maister, Cowham, master, arrived at Petersburg from Hull. In November Lloyd's List reported that as she was coming from Petersburg she had gotten on shore at Carlsheim, on the coast of Sweden, but was expected to be gotten off.

Year	Master	Owner	Trade	Source & notes
1804	R.Cowham; O.Connell; T.Park	Maister & Co. T.Egginton	Hull–Petersburg; London Transport	LR
1808	T.Park	Egginton	London Transport	LR; damages repaired 1804

On 25 January 1809 the Maisters transport was coming from Spithead when she drove on to the Hospital Shoal. She lost two anchors and cables. She was later refloated and taken in to Portsmouth, Hampshire.

Year	Master	Owner	Trade	Source & notes
1809	T.Park	T.Egginton	London Transport	LR; damages repaired 1804
1813	T.Park; Mentrap	T.Egginton	London Transport	LR; damages repaired 1804 & large repair 1813

On 25 November 1813, Maister was on her way from Hull to Martinique when HMS Bulwark ran into her off the Owers. The collision dismasted Maister, which went into Cowes the next day.

In 1813 the EIC had lost its monopoly on the trade between India and Britain. British ships were then free to sail to India or the Indian Ocean under a licence from the EIC. Maister's owners applied for a licence on 27 November 1814, and received the licence on 29 December.

Year	Master	Owner	Trade	Source & notes
1815	Wm.Wiseman	T.Egginton	London–Isle de France (Mauritius)	LR; damages repaired 1804 & large repair 1813

Maister, Wiseman, master, Parkinson, owner, sailed for Bombay on 7 February 1816 under a licence from the EIC.

Year	Master	Owner	Trade	Source & notes
1818	F.Berryman	Parkinson & Co.	Hull-Petersburg	LR; large repair 1813 & repairs 1818
1819	F.Berryman (or Berriman)	Parkinson & Co.	Hull-Petersburg; London–Ceylon	LR; large repair 1813 & 1818

On 28 January 1819 Maister sailed to Fort William, India (Calcutta), again under a licence from the EIC.

Year	Master	Owner	Trade	Source & notes
1820	F.Berryman	Parkinson & Co.	Hull-Petersburg; London–Picton	LR; large repair 1813 & repairs 1818

On 14 July 1821, Maister, Berriman, master, arrived at Quebec with 48 settlers after a voyage of 59 days from Hull.

Year	Master	Owner	Trade	Source & notes
1822	F.Berryman; Wokes; Stokes	Richardson	London–Nova Scotia	LR; thorough repair 1821 & repairs 1822
1823	T.Stokes	Martin & Co.	Greenock–New Brunswick	LR; large repair 1821 & repairs 1822

== Fate ==
On 13 December 1822, Maister, of Port Glasgow, Wokes, master, was sailing from St John, New Brunswick when she was wrecked on the Isle of Tyrie in the Inner Hebrides. Her crew were rescued, and it was expected that her cargo would be recovered.
