= Thomas Le Marchant Gosselin =

Royal Navy Admiral from Guernsey (1765–1857)

Admiral Thomas Le Marchant Gosselin
- Born: 7 May 1765; Saint Peter Port, Guernsey
- Died: 27 November 1857 (aged 92); Jersey
- Relatives: Gerard Gosselin (brother)
- Military career
- Allegiance: United Kingdom
- Branch: Royal Navy
- Service years: 1787–1857
- Rank: Admiral
- Commands: HMS Dispatch; HMS Kingfisher; HMS Brunswick; HMS Diamond; HMS Syren; HMS Melampus; HMS Argo; HMS Ville de Paris; HMS Latona; HMS Audacious
- Conflicts: American Revolution; Battle of Fort Royal; Battle of the Chesapeake; Battle of Saint Kitts; Battle of Delaware Bay; Battle of the Saintes; Battle of the Mona Passage; French Revolutionary Wars; Glorious First of June; Napoleonic Wars; Battle of Corunna
- Other work: Magistrate for Hertfordshire

Admiral Thomas Le Marchant Gosselin (7 May 1765 – 27 November 1857) was a British naval officer of the 18th and 19th centuries who received the patronage of senior officers such as Samuel Hood, 1st Viscount Hood and William Cornwallis. Gosselin joined the Royal Navy in 1778 and as a junior officer had extensive service in the American Revolution, including participating in the Battle of the Saintes in April 1782. Promoted to commander in April 1793, Gosselin took part in the Glorious First of June as commander of HMS Kingfisher. He was promoted to post-captain in July 1795 and took command of a variety of ships including most notably HMS Syren, HMS Latona, and HMS Audacious. Gosselin frequently served on blockade duties in the English Channel and on convoy duties to and from the West Indies.

His final services at sea in 1809 included his assistance in the evacuation from Corunna of the army of Lieutenant-General Sir John Moore. Gosselin refused command of HMS Cressy in 1810 due to health issues and never served at sea again. He was promoted to rear-admiral in June 1814 and admiral in November 1841. In October 1854 Gosselin became the most senior admiral in the Royal Navy but was never promoted to admiral of the fleet, either because of the long length of time since his last service at sea or because of his ongoing health issues.

== Early life ==
Thomas Le Marchant Gosselin was born on 7 May 1765 at Saint Peter Port as the second son of Colonel Joshua Gosselin of the North regiment of the Royal Guernsey Militia, and Martha, daughter of Thomas Le Marchant of Guernsey. His younger brother was General Gerard Gosselin, and he had two other younger brothers who died serving at Trinidad in 1803.

== Naval career ==
=== Early career ===
Gosselin joined the Royal Navy on 2 August 1778 as a follower of Captain Philip Boteler in the new ship HMS Actaeon. He later transferred with Captain Boteler to the ship-of-the-line HMS Ardent in June 1779. On 16 August Ardent was captured by a combined Franco-Spanish fleet near Portsmouth. Gosselin spent three months as a prisoner of war at Alençon. After his release he joined the ship-of-the-line HMS Barfleur, the flag ship of Rear-Admiral Sir Samuel Hood, on 11 October 1780. On Barfleur Gosselin took part in a number of major actions of the American Revolution as a part of the fleet of Admiral Sir George Rodney, including the Battle of Fort Royal, Battle of the Chesapeake, and the Battle of Saint Kitts. After this battle Gosselin transferred to the frigate HMS Champion commanded by Rear-Admiral Hood's brother, Captain Alexander Hood. In Champion Gosselin then participated in the Battle of Delaware Bay and the Battle of the Saintes, where the French admiral François Joseph Paul de Grasse surrendered. Gosselin was also present at the Battle of the Mona Passage where a squadron under Rear-Admiral Hood captured an escaping French squadron, with Champion capturing a French corvette. In June 1782 Gosselin transferred with Captain Hood to the frigate HMS Aimable, serving in her until the American Revolution ended with the Treaty of Paris in 1783. He returned home on 26 June 1783.

After this Gosselin continued as a midshipman, serving on the ship-of-the-line HMS Carnatic at Plymouth, the sloop HMS Nautilus, and the ship-of-the-line HMS Grampus off the coast of Africa as flag ship of Commodore Edward Thompson. Gosselin then re-joined the now Vice-Admiral Lord Hood on the ships-of-the-line HMS Triumph and then Barfleur while Vice-Admiral Hood served as Commander-in-Chief, Portsmouth. On 1 December 1787 Gosselin was promoted to lieutenant, and in September 1788 he was appointed as such to the newly captured sloop HMS Atalante in which he sailed to the East Indies in January 1789 as part of the squadron of Commodore William Cornwallis. Soon after arriving in the East Indies Gosselin was removed by Commodore Cornwallis into his flag ship, the ship-of-the-line HMS Crown, and in November 1791 he followed Commodore Cornwallis into the frigate HMS Minerva where he served as her first lieutenant. On 23 April 1793 Gosselin was promoted to commander and given command of the brig HMS Dispatch. On 19 March 1794 he was given command of the sloop HMS Kingfisher. Initially Gosselin commanded her on the Downs Station, but later was attached to the North Sea and Channel fleets. As such, Gosselin and Kingfisher participated in the Glorious First of June on 1 June. While serving in the English Channel under the now Vice-Admiral Cornwallis, Gosselin and Kingfisher assisted in the capturing of a French convoy carrying wine and naval stores on 7 June 1795. In this action Gosselin attacked a French frigate attempting to tow away a large store ship, forcing the frigate to abandon the ship to Gosselin.

=== Post-captain ===
On 4 July 1795 Gosselin was sent by Vice-Admiral Cornwallis as acting-captain of the ship-of-the-line HMS Brunswick, and on 23 July he was confirmed in that position and promoted to post-captain. He served as captain of Brunswick until October. Gosselin's next commands were on the Îles Saint-Marcouf station, where he commanded the frigate HMS Diamond from 22 April 1796 until 25 July when he took command of another frigate, HMS Syren. In March 1798 Gosselin and Syren convoyed a large fleet of merchant ships to the Leeward Islands and Jamaica, including Major-General Henry Bowyer and his staff, for which service the masters of the merchant ships presented Gosselin with a valuable sword. Gosselin stayed with Syren on the Leeward Islands Station and on 20 August 1799 took part in the successful occupation of Surinam by the forces of Vice-Admiral Lord Hugh Seymour and Lieutenant-General Thomas Trigge. After this he escorted another convoy home in Syren. In 1800 Gosselin paid attendance on George III for three months while the latter holidayed with his family in Weymouth, before in February 1801 escorting another convoy of merchant ships to the West Indies. Having done so Gosselin transferred to command of the frigate HMS Melampus at Jamaica on 23 October, and in her sailed back to Britain. He paid off Melampus in June 1802.

On 2 February 1804 Gosselin's employment was again assisted by his relationship with the now Admiral Cornwallis, taking command of his flag ship, the ship-of-the-line HMS Ville de Paris in the Channel Fleet. In early 1804 he also very briefly commanded the frigate HMS Argo. Gosselin served in Ville de Paris until September when he was given command of the frigate HMS Latona and the inshore squadron of the Brest blockade. Latona's captures under Gosselin included the 12-gun Spanish privateer Amphion on 22 October 1805. For his service commanding the inshore squadron Gosselin received the thanks of Admiral Cornwallis, Admiral Lord Gardner, and Vice-Admiral Sir Charles Cotton. On 4 February 1806 he assumed command of the ship-of-the-line HMS Audacious in the squadron of Rear-Admiral Sir Richard Strachan at Plymouth. On 19 May the squadron sailed to pursue a French squadron of six ships-of-the-line commanded by Jérôme Bonaparte to the West Indies, and by 8 August Gosselin and Audacious were cruising off Madeira and the Canary Islands. Less than a week after this Audacious was sailing to the north of Barbados when she was totally dismasted in the Great Coastal hurricane of 1806.

By 1807 Gosselin had returned Audacious to the Channel Fleet in which he served until the beginning of 1808 when he moved to the blockade of Ferrol. Audacious escorted the army of Lieutenant-General Sir John Moore from the Downs to Sweden to fight in the Finnish War, but disagreements with Gustav IV Adolf meant that Gosselin and Audacious escorted Moore's army back in July. In August Gosselin convoyed a large body of troops to Portugal with Lieutenant-General Sir Harry Burrard as his personal guest on Audacious, as the general went to supersede Lieutenant-General Sir Arthur Wellesley. After debarking the soldiers, Gosselin joined Vice-Admiral Cotton off the Tagus. Gosselin and Audacious continued there until the retreat of the army of Lieutenant-General Moore to Corunna in January 1809, when he assisted in escorting the transports carrying Moore's army back to Britain. The same month, Gosselin received the thanks of both Houses of Parliament for his unremitted exertions in doing so. The army dispatches on the Battle of Corunna were written by Lieutenant-General John Hope, Moore having been killed, on board Audacious. Gosselin resigned his command of Audacious in March 1809 and was subsequently appointed to command the ship-of-the-line HMS Cressy when she was launched in 1810, but Gosselin declined the command on the grounds of ill health.

=== Admiral and illness ===
Gosselin was promoted to rear-admiral as a rear-admiral of the blue on 4 June 1814. By seniority he became a vice-admiral on 27 May 1825 and an admiral on 23 November 1841. (Note: Full dates of promotions: rear-admiral of the blue 4 June 1814, rear-admiral of the white 12 August 1819, rear-admiral of the red 19 July 1821, vice-admiral of the blue 27 May 1825, vice-admiral of the white 22 July 1830, vice-admiral of the red 10 January 1837, admiral of the white 23 November 1841, admiral of the red 24 April 1847) Gosselin never served at sea as an admiral, instead becoming a magistrate for Hertfordshire. Sir John Knox Laughton described Gosselin as 'a professional officer of real ability' and suggested that he was only not employed further after 1809 because of either his illness or the circumstances of his rich marriage. Upon the death of Admiral of the Fleet Sir Thomas Byam Martin on 21 October 1854 Gosselin was the most senior admiral alive and might have been expected to be promoted in his place as admiral of the fleet. For the first time this was not done and the post remained empty and Gosselin un-promoted until his death, when Admiral Sir Charles Ogle became the most senior admiral and was made admiral of the fleet. Gosselin was instead described as the 'senior admiral of the red', with it being suggested that his debilitating illness was a mental one which made him unsuitable to be the true senior admiral of the navy.

== Death ==
Gosselin died at his home in Jersey on 27 November 1857 as an admiral of the red and was buried at St Leonard's Church, Bengeo, Hertfordshire.

== Family ==
Gosselin married Sarah Hadsley, daughter and heiress of Jeremiah Hadsley of Ware Priory, on 18 March 1809. Together they had one son and three daughters, including:

- Emma Gosselin (b. 24 May 1811)
- Martin Hadsley Gosselin JP (5 July 1813 – 1869) who married Frances Orris Marshall, the daughter of Rear-Admiral Sir John Marshall.
