= New Ireland (Maine) =

Crown colony of the Kingdom of Great Britain c.1779-83; reprised 1812

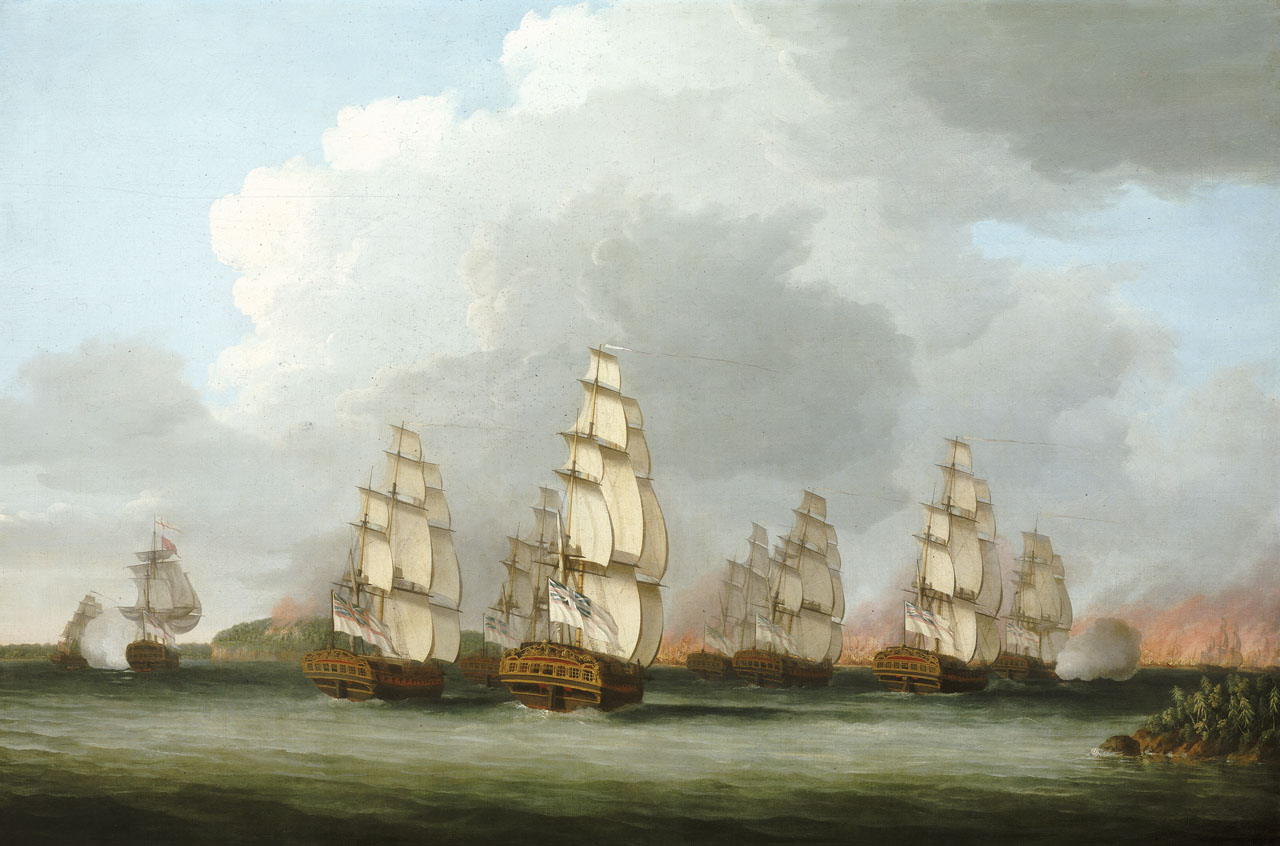
Destruction of the American Fleet at Penobscot Bay by Dominic Serres. Britain defending New Ireland from the Penobscot Expedition during the American Revolution

New Ireland was a Crown colony of the Kingdom of Great Britain twice established in modern-day Maine after British forces captured the area during the American Revolutionary War and again during the War of 1812. The colony lasted four years during the Revolution, and eight months during the War of 1812. At the end of each war the British ceded the land to the United States under the terms of the Treaty of Paris and the Treaty of Ghent, respectively.

== American Revolution ==
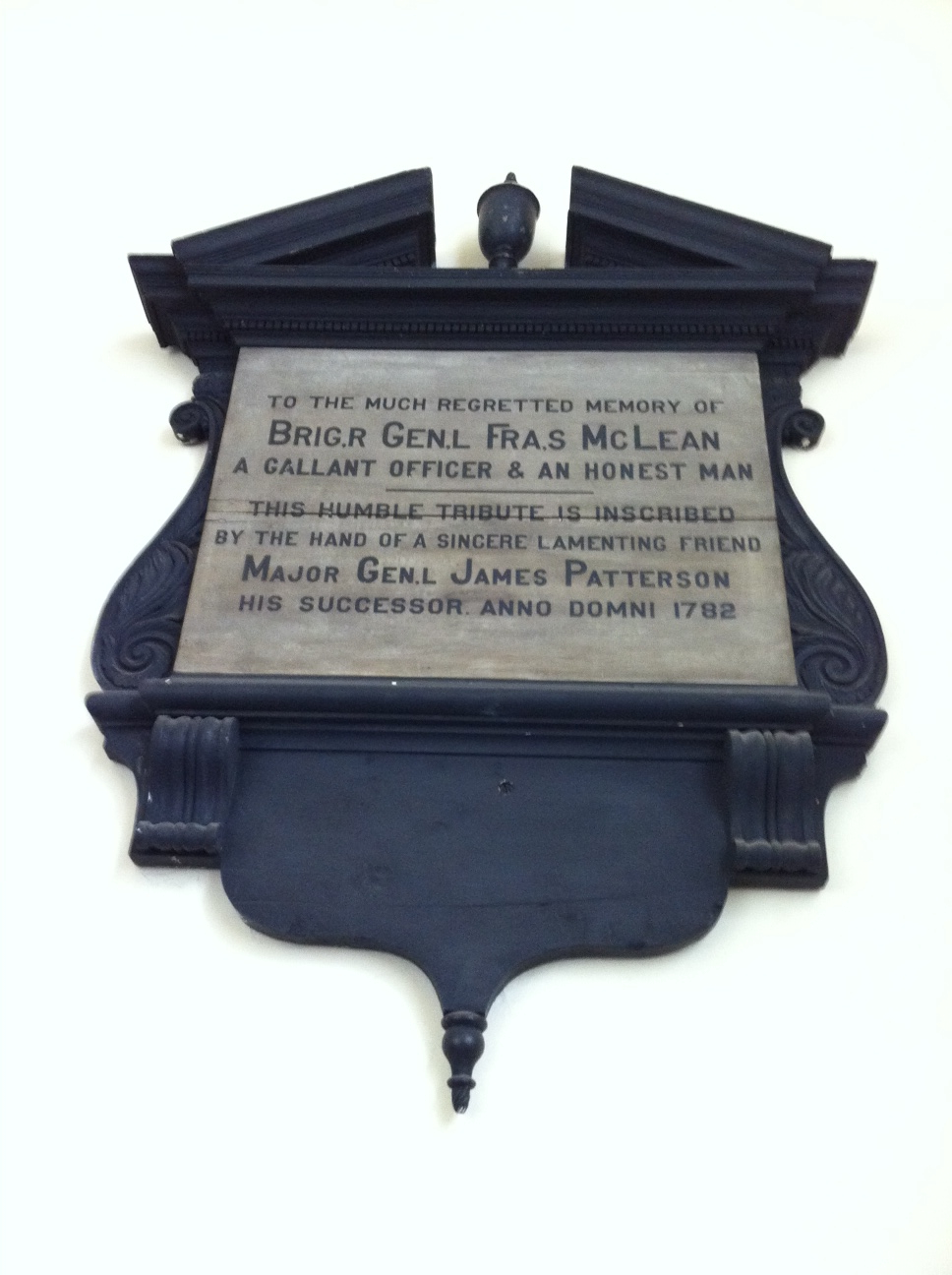
Francis McLean Plaque, St. Paul's Church, Halifax, Nova Scotia

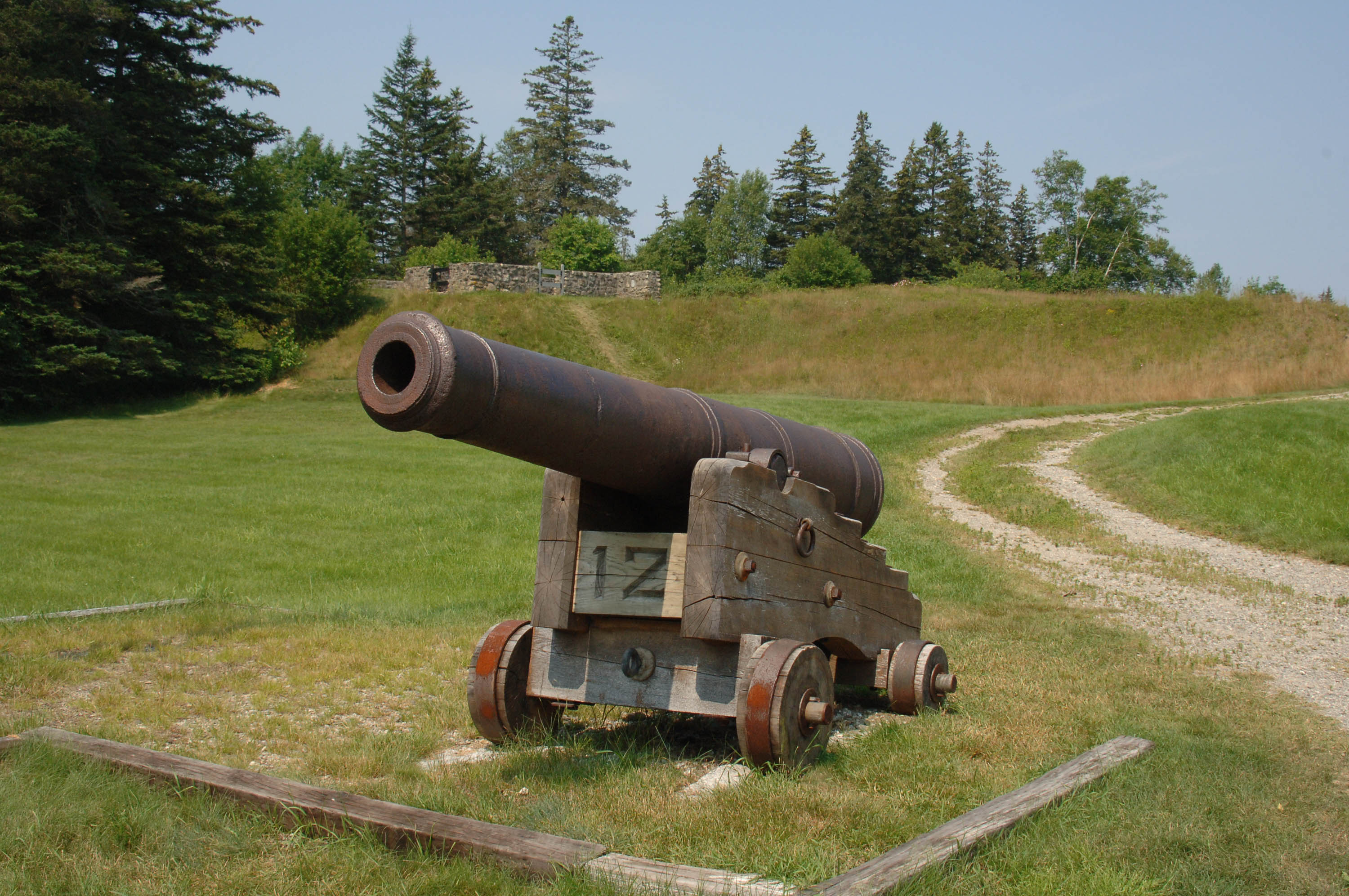
Fort George in Castine, Maine, a British fort built to protect New Ireland

In 1779 the British adopted a strategy to capture parts of Maine, especially around Penobscot Bay, and transform it into a new colony to be called "New Ireland". The scheme was promoted by exiled Loyalists John Caleff (1725–1812), John Nutting (fl. 1775–1785) and Anglo-Irishman William Knox (1732–1810). It was intended to be a permanent colony for Loyalists and a base for military action during the war.

On 30 May 1779, eight British ships of war left from Halifax with 640 troops. Under the command of General Francis McLean, the ships entered Castine's harbor, landed troops, and captured the village. They began erecting Fort George on one of the highest points of the peninsula. Alarmed by this incursion, the Commonwealth of Massachusetts sent the Penobscot Expedition led by Massachusetts general Solomon Lovell and Continental Navy captain Dudley Saltonstall, seconded by General Peleg Wadsworth. Colonel Paul Revere was given charge of the ordnance. The military expedition consisted of a fleet of 19 warships and 25 support ships, carrying 344 guns in total.

Although badly outnumbered, McLean and his British forces (the 74th Regiment and the 82nd Regiment) withstood the 21-day siege and the Americans were routed by the arrival of British reinforcements under the command of Collier. The Patriots, having been blocked from escaping by sea by the Royal Navy, burned their ships near present-day Bangor and walked home. New England was unable to dislodge the British despite a reorganized defense and the imposition of martial law in parts of Maine. Some of the most easterly towns declared themselves neutral and remained uninvolved in the war. The battle was one of the greatest British victories of the war. The failed Penobscot Expedition, which cost the revolutionaries eight million dollars and 43 ships, proved to be the greatest American naval defeat until Pearl Harbor in 1941. The British 74th Regiment held Majabagaduce until the end of the war.

The British established a fort, under the command of Campbell, protecting about 30 houses occupied by Loyalists attracted to the area. The fort housed captured American privateers and received trade from Halifax and New York. The guide who led the loyalists to the fort was discovered, tried by a court-martial under Major Burton, condemned and executed under the direction of Major General James Wadsworth. A party of 25 Loyalists subsequently went to Wadsworth's quarters and took him prisoner. He eventually escaped on 15 June 1781. New Ireland was ceded to the Americans as part of the Paris peace settlement. Saltonstall and Revere were later court-martialed, charged with cowardice and insubordination; the boards found Saltonsall guilty, but acquitted Revere.

At the end of the Revolutionary War, many American Loyalists in the area migrated eastward to the Canadian Maritimes, some towing their houses behind their boats. Subsequently known as United Empire Loyalists, they crossed the newly established international boundary line of the St. Croix River and established St. Andrews, one of the oldest towns in New Brunswick. In addition, many soldiers of the 74th chose to be disbanded in St. Andrews (last muster May 24, 1784), and took up land grants there along with the Loyalists, rather than return to Britain. After the peace was signed in 1783, the New Ireland proposal was abandoned. In 1784 the decision was made to split New Brunswick off from Nova Scotia and made it into the desired Loyalist colony. It was planned to be named "New Ireland", but these plans fell through and it was instead named New Brunswick. The Treaty of Paris that ended the war was ambiguous in defining the boundary between Maine and the neighbouring British provinces of New Brunswick (Sunbury County, Nova Scotia) and Quebec.

The New Ireland colony and the Penobscot expedition was fictionalised in the 2010 novel The Fort by British author Bernard Cornwell.

== War of 1812 ==
John Coape Sherbrooke, who re-established New Ireland in 1814

During the War of 1812, from his base in Halifax, Nova Scotia, in August and September 1814, Lieutenant Governor John Coape Sherbrooke of Nova Scotia sent a naval force and 500 British troops under the command of Vice Admiral Colpoys to conquer Maine and re-establish the colony of New Ireland. In 26 days, they succeeded in taking possession of Hampden, Bangor, and Machias, destroying or capturing 17 American ships. They won the Battle of Hampden and occupied the village of Castine for the rest of the war, rebuilding Fort George, occupying a former American fort, and building three new forts there. Like the Revolutionary War, the goal was to incorporate Maine into Canada; George F.W. Young, a retired Saint Mary's University history professor, said that the British “wanted to extend the border back down to what they thought was the historic frontier.”

The Treaty of Ghent returned this territory to the United States. The British left in April 1815, at which time they collected £10,750 obtained from tariff duties at Castine. The brief life of the colony yielded customs revenues, called the "Castine Fund", which were subsequently used to finance a military library in Halifax and found Dalhousie College. Dalhousie University has a street named "Castine Way".

== See also ==
- History of Maine
- Military history of Nova Scotia - War of 1812
- History of Nova Scotia
