= Sherbrooke Lake =

,Sherbrooke Lake may refer to:

- Sherbrooke Lake (British Columbia) in British Columbia, Canada
- Sherbrooke Lake (Nova Scotia) in Nova Scotia, Canada
- Sherbrooke Lake (Lunenburg) in Nova Scotia, Canada
