= Edward Griffith Colpoys =

Vice-Admiral Sir Edward Griffith Colpoys KCB
- Born: Edward Griffith c. 1767
- Died: 8 October 1832; Ireland Island, Bermuda
- Military career
- Allegiance: United Kingdom
- Branch: Royal Navy
- Service years: 1782–1832
- Rank: Vice-Admiral
- Conflicts: French Revolutionary Wars; Battle of Groix; Spithead Mutiny; Napoleonic Wars; Battle of Cape Finisterre
- Awards: Knight Commander of the Order of the Bath

Vice-Admiral Sir Edward Griffith Colpoys KCB (c. 1767 – 8 October 1832) was a senior officer of the British Royal Navy during the early nineteenth century. The nephew of a prominent admiral, John Colpoys, Edward Griffith was able to rapidly advance in the Navy, until his involvement at his uncle's side in a violent confrontation aboard his ship HMS London in 1797 left a number of men dead and the Channel Fleet in a state of mutiny. Griffith's career recovered from the events of the Spithead Mutiny and he enjoyed a successful period as a frigate commander off the French coast, later becoming the captain of the ship of the line HMS Dragon during the Trafalgar campaign. Although Dragon did not fight at the climactic Battle of Trafalgar, Griffith was engaged at the preceding Battle of Cape Finisterre in July 1805.

In 1812, Griffith was advanced to rear-admiral and later that year commanded a squadron off Maine during the War of 1812, leading a successful attack up the Penobscot River in 1814 to re-establish New Ireland (Maine). Griffith remained in North America until 1821, as commander of the base at Halifax, Nova Scotia. On his return he learned of the death of his uncle and out of respect took his surname as his own. Griffith Colpoys returned to Halifax again in 1830, but his health was failing and he died at Bermuda on his journey back to Britain in 1832.

== Early life ==
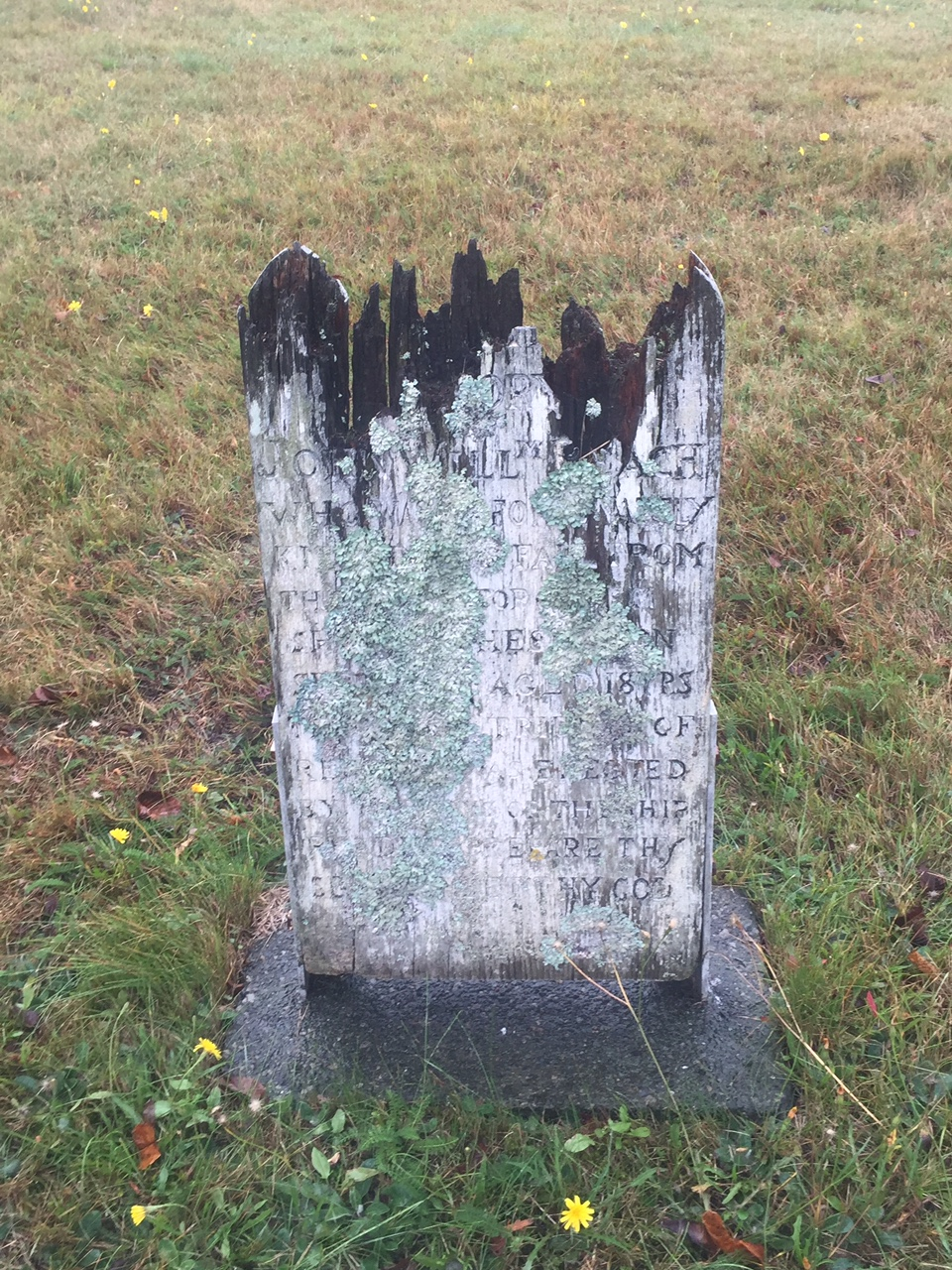
Crew of HMS Winchester, Royal Navy Burying Ground (Halifax, Nova Scotia)

Griffith was born in the late 1760s, possibly 1767, into a Royal Navy family. His father was Sir Edward Griffith (1767–1832) and his uncle was John Colpoys (1742–1821), later to become a prominent admiral of the French Revolutionary Wars.

== Career ==
In 1782, aged 15, Griffith entered the Navy under his uncle's patronage, joining the new frigate HMS Phaeton. He remained in the Navy during the peace of 1783 to 1793 and by the time the French Revolutionary War broke out he was a lieutenant in HMS Boyne, the flagship of Sir John Jervis during his campaign in the West Indies. While serving in the Caribbean, Griffith was promoted to commander and took command of the ship HMS Avenger, returning to Europe in May 1794 after being promoted to post captain. He immediately became the captain of the second rate HMS London, the flagship of his uncle and joined the Channel Fleet, fighting at the Battle of Groix in 1795.

In 1797, Griffith lost his command of HMS London in highly controversial circumstances at the outbreak of the Spithead Mutiny. With disaffection spreading throughout the fleet, a delegation of admirals met with the leading mutineers on the fleet flagship HMS Queen Charlotte, hoping to quell the uprising. When this failed, the leaders of the mutiny met to discuss their next moves, choosing Colpoys flagship London as their base. As the delegates from other ships came aboard, Admiral Colpoys, with Griffith at his side, demanded that they leave. They refused and a fight broke out, during which shots were fired, although whether the first came from the mutineers or Colpoys' Royal Marines was never firmly established. Several mutineers were killed and the firing caused the entire ship to rise in mutiny against its officers. Taken prisoner, Colpoys, Griffith and the other officers were held by the mutineers for four days before they were sent on shore. The mutiny was eventually quelled, the mutineers gaining most of their demands and returning to their ships as promised.

Continued service on London was of course impossible for both Griffith and Colpoys, and Griffith was hastily despatched to the frigate HMS Niger off the French Atlantic coast, later moving to the frigate HMS Triton. In these ships, Griffith was successful, capturing three French privateers. In 1800 he was attached to an expedition against Ferrol in the frigate HMS Diamond, in which he remained until 1804. After the Peace of Amiens, Griffith moved to the ship of the line HMS Dragon and served with Sir Robert Calder's fleet during the Trafalgar campaign, fighting at the Battle of Cape Finisterre on 22 July 1805. He was not present at the Battle of Trafalgar in October 1805 and in the aftermath of the campaign assisted in escorting troops convoys in the Mediterranean. In 1807, Griffith took command of the new ship of the line HMS Sultan, participating in the blockade of Toulon. While employed in this duty on 12 August 1808, Sultan was struck by lightning and badly damaged at Menorca, the blast fatally electrocuting nine sailors and injuring three more.

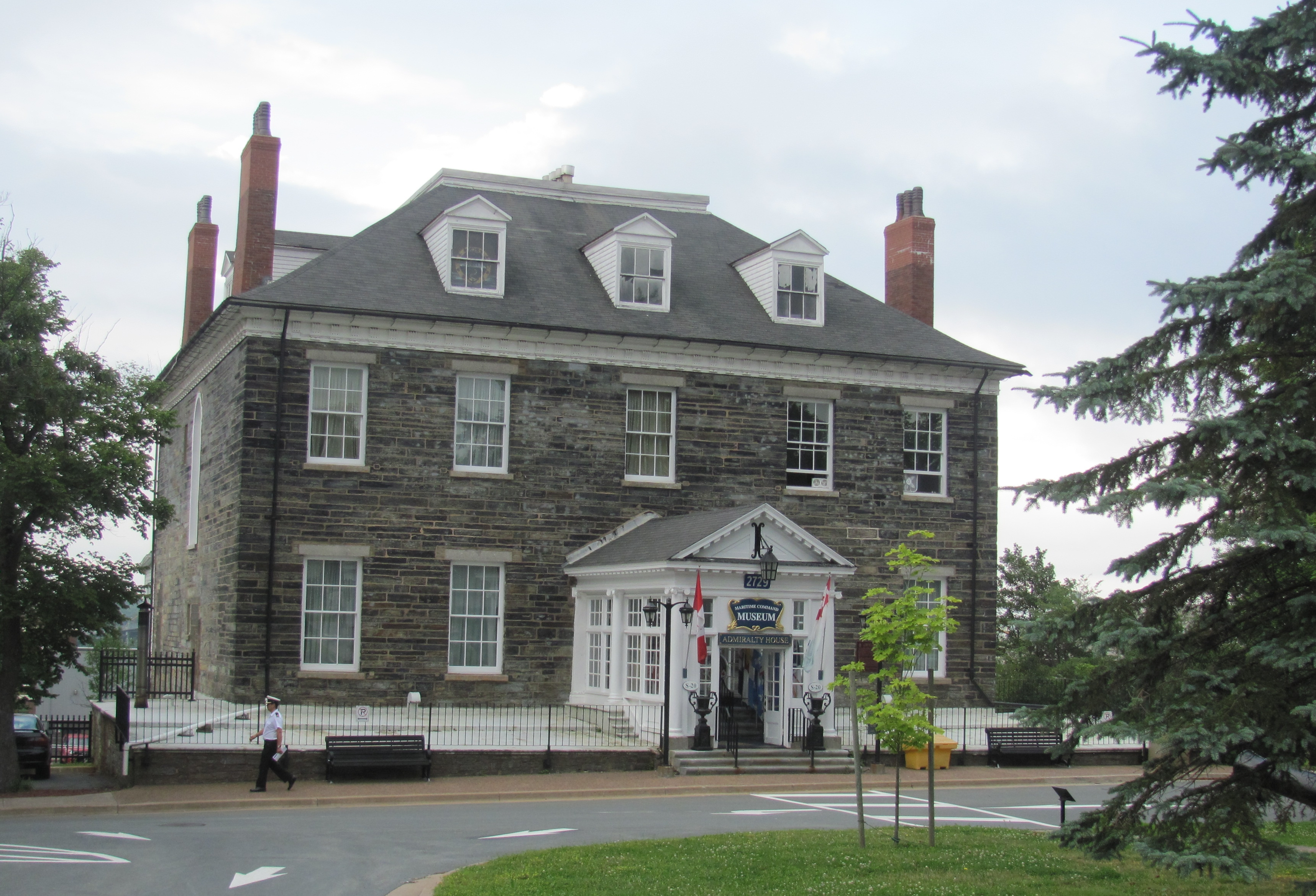
Colpoys' Residence while Commander-in-Chief, North American Station

=== Commander-in-Chief, North American Station ===
In 1812, Griffith was promoted to rear-admiral and given command of a squadron operating off the Maine coast following the outbreak of the War of 1812. Griffith's operations were successful and in September 1814 he led an amphibious operation up the Penobscot River to re-establish New Ireland (Maine), seizing several towns and forcing the United States Navy to scuttle the frigate USS Adams at Hampden rather than see her captured by Griffith's forces. (He was the namesake of Fort Griffith (Maine), which was established in 1814 and abandoned the following year.) Griffith remained off Maine until 1816, when he moved north to become the commander of the naval base at Halifax, Nova Scotia, a position that made him senior officer of the North American Station. He stayed in this post for five years, receiving a promotion to vice-admiral in 1820, and on his return to Britain in early 1821 was presented with a letter from the town's prominent citizens thanking him for his service. When his uncle John Colpoys died shortly afterwards, Griffith added his surname to his own and became Edward Griffith Colpoys.

Between 1821 and 1830, Griffith Colpoys remained at home with his family, before returning to Halifax in 1830 to take up his old position as commander of the North American Station, which had just been merged with the Jamaica station, making Griffith Colpoys senior officer north of the Caribbean. However his health was rapidly failing and despite elevation to a Knight Commander of the Order of the Bath in May 1831 he was replaced in 1832, sailing for Bermuda.

== Personal life ==
He married Mary Anne Adair (1771-1839) the widow of the Hon. Sir John Wilson, one of the Judges of Court of Common Pleas who died in 1793. His children included:

- Edward Griffith Colpoys, who died at the Cape of Good Hope in 1831.
- Henry Griffith Colpoys, who also commanded the flag-ship HMS Winchester.
- John Adair Griffith Colpoys, who married Anne Sumner, only daughter of John Bird Sumner, the Lord Bishop of Chester and Archbishop of Canterbury, in 1828.
- Susan Colpoys (d. 1875), who married Charles Christopher Johnson, son of Sir John Johnson, 2nd Baronet, in 1818.

During the voyage to Bermuda, his health took a turn for the worse and he died on Ireland Island on 8 October 1832, having selected his burial plot at the Royal Naval Cemetery the day before. He left three sons, two of whom served in the Navy and one of which died just a few weeks after his father while stationed at Cape Town, and a daughter.

=== Legacy ===
Both Fort Griffith (Maine) and Colpoys Bay, Ontario were named in honor of him.

Military offices
Preceded by Sir David Milne	Commander-in-Chief, North American Station; 1816–1821	Succeeded by Sir William Fahie
Preceded by Sir Charles Ogle	Commander-in-Chief, North America and West Indies Station; 1830–1832	Succeeded by Sir George Cockburn
