= Sherbrooke (Barbados) =

History

Nova Scotia
- Name: Sherbrooke
- Namesake: John Coape Sherbrooke
- Owner: James Caven, Barbados
- Port of registry: Halifax, Nova Scotia
- Acquired: 18 August 1814
- Commissioned: 27 August 1814
- Fate: Confiscated and condemned April 1815

General characteristics
- Type: Letter of Marque Brig
- Tons burthen: 210 bm
- Length: 86 ft 9 in (26.4 m)
- Beam: 23 ft 7 in (7.2 m)
- Depth: 10 ft 9 in (3.3 m)
- Sail plan: brig
- Crew: 16
- Armament: 11 cannons

Sherbrooke (Barbados) was a Canadian letter of marque in the last year of the War of 1812. She was originally the American privateer brig Henry Guilder (or Henry Gilder). She was condemned and confiscated by the authorities in Halifax in April 1815.

== History ==
The American privateer Henry Guilder, of New York, had a short career in 1814. She captured the merchantman Young Farmer, which was carrying a cargo of indigo worth US$40,000, a substantial sum in those days. On 12 July, she encountered the British frigate Niemen, which captured the American. Henry Guilder was armed with 12 guns (eight 12-pounders and two long 9-pounders), and had a crew of 45 or 50 men.

James Caven, a Barbados merchant, purchased Henry Guilder for £2,475 at the prize court's auction at Halifax on 16 August 1814. He had her commissioned on 27 August under the name Sherbrooke. Sir John Coape Sherbrooke was the governor of the province of Nova Scotia but two previous privateers had already carried his name: the highly successful Sir John Sherbrooke of Halifax, and the less successful Sir John Sherbrooke of Saint John, New Brunswick.

Although he had armed her with 11 cannons, Sherbrooke sailed with a crew of only sixteen men, too few to man such a battery. As a result, she only mounted five guns. Caven had her captain, William Cocken, sail her first to Delaware and then to Bermuda where an expedition was gathering to attack New Orleans. At Bermuda, a new captain took over, Capt. William Coulson. Seeing no prospect for profitable privateering, Caven loaded Sherbrooke with captured flour and sailed her back to Halifax.

After unloading her, Caven offered Sherbrooke at auction on 7 January 1815. Unfortunately, ex-privateers were a glut on the market and he was unable to sell her. Then disaster struck.

== Fate ==
In April, three months after the end of the war, Thomas Nelson Jeffrey, Collector of Customs at Halifax, seized Sherbrooke, citing technicalities under three old laws. Caven protested, but the Court ruled against him and Sherbrooke was condemned and confiscated.
