= Charles Morris (naval officer) =

American naval officer (1784–1856)

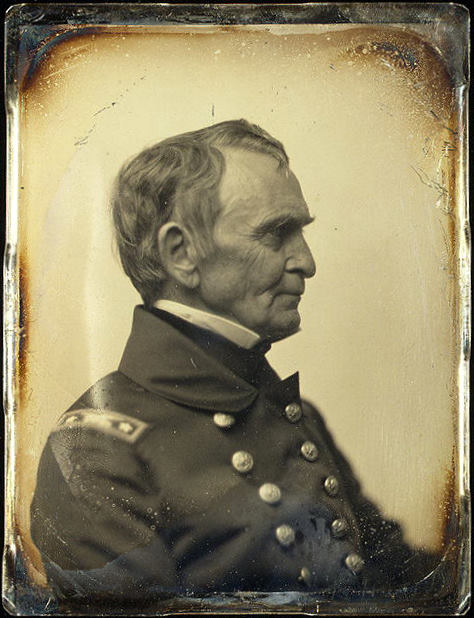
- Daguerreotype of Morris by Southworth & Hawes, c. 1850
- Born: July 26, 1784; Woodstock, Connecticut
- Died: January 27, 1856 (aged 71); Washington, D.C.
- Burial place: Oak Hill Cemetery; Washington, D.C., U.S.
- Military career
- Branch: United States Navy
- Service years: 1799-1856
- Rank: Commodore
- Units: USS Constitution
- Commands: USS Adams
- Conflicts: Quasi-War; First Barbary War; Second Barbary War; War of 1812; Constitution vs Guerriere; Battle of Hampden

Charles Morris (July 26, 1784 – January 27, 1856) was an American naval officer whose service extended through the first half of the 19th century.

== Biography ==
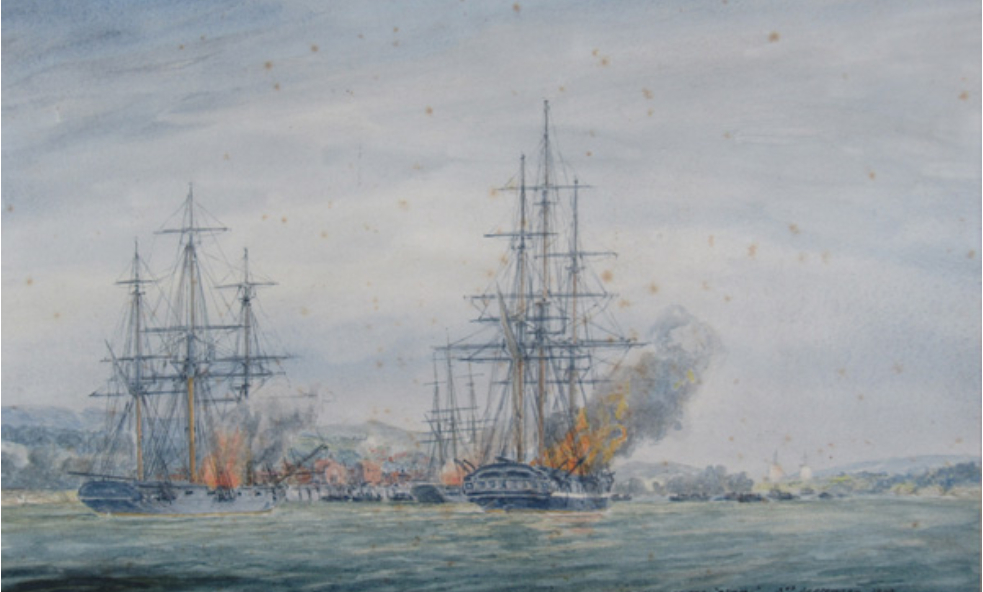
The Burning of the Adams, 3rd September 1814, Irwin John David Bevan

Morris was born in Woodstock, Connecticut on July 26, 1784. After being appointed a midshipman in July 1799, he served in the Quasi-War with France, First Barbary War, the Second Barbary War, and the War of 1812. He was promoted to captain in March 1813. He served as a Navy Commissioner from 1823 to 1827, and as the Chief of the Bureau of Construction, Equipment, and Repairs from 1844 to 1847.

In 1812, Morris was appointed first lieutenant of USS Constitution under the command of Isaac Hull during her battle with HMS Guerriere, in which action Morris was severely wounded. He was promoted to captain on March 3, 1813. In 1814, he commanded USS Adams in raiding expeditions against British commerce. Cornered in the Penobscot River in Maine by a British squadron under Captain Robert Barrie, Morris and his men went ashore with their cannons and, assisted by local militia attempted to hold off the British amphibious force in the Battle of Hampden. The British regulars routed the Americans, however, and Morris and his crew had to burn the ship and escape overland to Portsmouth, New Hampshire.

In 1819 after protracted negotiation, the government of Venezuela granted all the demands of the United States on 11 August negotiated by Commodore Oliver Hazard Perry. However, during the passage down the Orinoco River, Perry was stricken with yellow fever and died on board USS John Adams.

Morris succeeded Perry in command of the squadron and USS John Adams accompanied his flagship USS Constellation on a voyage to the Plata River to continue the negotiations inaugurated by Perry to establish friendly relations with the new Latin American republics and to protect American commerce from South American privateers. After visiting Montevideo and Buenos Aires, both ships returned to the United States, arriving at Hampton Roads on 24 April 1820.

In 1835, his daughter Louise eloped and married William Wilson Corcoran, a banker and philanthropist living in Washington, D.C.

In his later career, Morris commanded the Mediterranean Squadron and served as the chief of the Bureau of Ordnance. He was elected an Associate Fellow of the American Academy of Arts and Sciences in 1840.

Charles Morris died at his home in Washington, D.C., on January 27, 1856, from a lung ailment. At the time of his death, he was the second highest-ranking officer in the Navy after Charles Stewart. He was buried at Oak Hill Cemetery in Washington, D.C., near the large family mausoleum built by his son-in-law, William Wilson Corcoran. Corcoran paid for a large, decorative headstone to be placed at the grave.

== Family ==
Charles Morris was married to Harriet Bowen in February 1815. They had four sons and six daughters. His eldest son, Charles W. Morris served in the United States Navy during the Mexican–American War. As a flag lieutenant under Commodore David Connor he died from wounds received in an attack on Tabasco, October 1846. Another son Brevet Lieutenant Colonel Robert Murray Morris, served as an officer in the U.S. Army from 1846 to 1873, distinguishing himself at Contreras and Chepultapec in the Mexican–American War and at Valverde and the Battle of Dinwiddie Court House the American Civil War. His youngest son, Commander George Upham Morris also served in the United States Navy from 1846 to 1874, in the Mexican–American War and in American Civil War where he commanded USS Cumberland in its engagement with CSS Virginia, June 8, 1862.

== Namesakes ==
- Ships in the United States Navy have been named USS Morris and USS Commodore Morris for him.
- Charles Morris Court, a street inside the Washington Navy Yard in Washington, D.C., is named after him.
- Charles Morris Avenue, a street inside the Portsmouth Naval Shipyard in Kittery, Maine, is named after him.

== Bibliography ==
- Ecker, Grace Dunlop (1933). A Portrait of Old George Town. Richmond, Va.: Garrett & Massie.
- Mitchell, Mary (1986). Chronicles of Georgetown Life, 1865-1900. Cabin John, Md.: Seven Locks Press. ISBN 0932020402.
