= Sir John Sherbrooke (Saint John) =

History

United States
- Name: New Orleans Packet
- Captured: August 1811

Nova Scotia
- Name: Sir John Sherbrooke
- Namesake: John Coape Sherbrooke
- Port of registry: Saint John, New Brunswick
- Commissioned: 27 November 1812
- Captured: 30 October 1813

General characteristics
- Type: Brig
- Tons burthen: 187 bm
- Sail plan: brig
- Crew: 20
- Armament: 10 cannons

Sir John Sherbooke of Saint John, New Brunswick was originally the American brig New Orleans Packet that HMS Guerriere detained in August 1811 and that was condemned at Saint John. Local merchants purchased her and named her after Sir John Coape Sherbrooke, Governor of Nova Scotia. After the outbreak of the War of 1812 she acquired a letter of marque. An American privateer captured her in October 1813.

== Origins ==
Napoleon I of France issued the Milan Decree on 17 December 1807 to enforce the Berlin Decree of 1806 which had initiated the Continental System. In retaliation, Great Britain authorized its men-of-war to capture vessels trading with France.

New Orleans Packet, Harris, master, cleared New York for Lisbon on 25 July 1810, but then instead stopped at Gibraltar where she unloaded part of her cargo. Receiving word that the French would lift the Decrees by 1 November, she waited there, only leaving for Bordeaux when she would arrive after 1 November. She arrived at the Gironde, where she waited for two weeks in quarantine. When she sailed into Bordeaux, local French authorities still detained her for coming from a British port. Eventually in June 1811 the French released her and she sailed for Boston.

On 25 August, Guerriere detained New Orleans Packet and sent her into New Brunswick, where she was condemned. There local merchants purchased her.

== Letter of Marque ==
Sir John Sherbooke was commissioned on 27 November 1812 and carried ten guns and a crew of 30 men. The smallness of her crew relative to the number of her guns, as well as the small amount of ammunition that she carried are consistent with her being an armed trader rather than a prize-taker.

Sir John Sherbrooke made several voyages to the West Indies. On 11 January 1813, The American privateer Defiance, under Capt. John P. Chazal, out of Charleston, South Carolina, armed with two guns and carrying a crew of 80 men, captured Sir John Sherbrook, Robson, master, from New Brunswick, at Cow Bay, Jamaica. The Americans abandoned her though and in February she reached Bermuda from Jamaica.

She made several other, more successful trading voyages. Then she left Richibucto, New Brunswick on 11 October under Captain Thomas Robson with a reduced crew of 20. On 31 October she encountered an American privateer off Cape Maize while sailing the Windward Passage between Cuba and Haiti. Sir John Sherbrooke was able to hold the privateer off for some five hours until Robson suffered a severe wound that almost killed him. The two vessels then accidentally ran into each other, and the Americans boarded the Canadian ship, capturing her. Sir John Sherbrooke had lost one man killed and seven wounded, including Robson. Two died later. The American privateer schooner Saucy Jack, again captained by John P. Chazal, out of Charleston, SC, had suffered 15 men wounded. The Americans took Sir John Sherbrooke into Cuba as a prize. Lloyd's List reported that Saucy Jack was armed with 11 guns [actually 7] and had a crew of 110 men.
