= HMS Bulwark (1807) =

74-gun third rate ship of the line of the Royal Navy

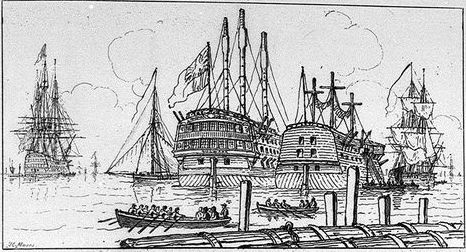
- HMS Bulwark (centre left) as a hulk in Portsmouth in 1826

History

United Kingdom
- Name: HMS Bulwark
- Ordered: 6 November 1794
- Builder: Master shipwright Nicholas Diddams, Portsmouth Dockyard
- Laid down: April 1804
- Launched: 23 April 1807
- Fate: Broken up, 1825

General characteristics
- Class & type: 74-gun third-rate ship of the line
- Tons burthen: 1,93980/94 (bm)
- Length: 181 ft 10 in (55.4 m) (gundeck); 150 ft 4 1/4 in (45.8 m) (keel)
- Beam: 49 ft 3 in (15.0 m)
- Depth of hold: 20 ft 7 in (6.3 m)
- Propulsion: Sails
- Sail plan: Full-rigged ship
- Armament: Gundeck: 28 × 32-pounder guns; Upper gundeck: 30 × 24-pounder guns; QD: 12 × 9-pounder guns; Fc: 4 × 9-pounder guns

HMS Bulwark was a 74-gun third-rate ship of the line of the Royal Navy, launched on 23 April 1807 at Portsmouth. She was designed by Sir William Rule as one of the large class 74s, and was the only ship built to her draught. She was built at Portsmouth Dockyard by Nicholas Diddams.

As a large 74, she carried 24-pounder guns on her upper gun deck instead of the 18-pounders found on the middling and common class 74s.

== History ==
On 24 March 1812, Bulwark was in company with Tonnant, Hogue, Colossus and Poictiers when they captured Emilie.

On 25 November 1813 Maister was on her way from Hull to Martinique when Bulwark ran into her off the Owers. The collision dismasted Maister, which went into Cowes the next day.

On 22 May 1814, Bulwark recaptured Tiger, Cowan, master. The American privateer Yankee had captured Tiger as Tiger was sailing from Malaga to London. Tiger arrived at Halifax on 28 July. The records of the Vice admiralty court at Halifax show that Tyger, Henry Davidson, master, had been sailing from Malaga to Stettin, and that Bulwark had recaptured her on 24 July.

On 23 October 1814 Bulwark captured the American privateer schooner Harlequin, of 330 tons (bm), ten 12-pounder guns, and 115 men. She had been out only four days when captured. (Note: Harlequin, Elisha D. Brown, master, of 232 tons (bm), had been cruising out of Portsmouth, Maine. She had been armed with 10 guns and had a crew of 117 men.)

On 22 January 1815, Bulwark captured the American privateer schooner Tomahawk, of Baltimore. She was of 210 tons (bm), had a crew of 84 men under the command of Philip Bessom, and was armed with eight 9-pounder carronades and a 24-pounder on a pivot carriage. She had been commissioned on 11 January, was two days out of Boston, and had not captured anything. She returned to Portsmouth on 2 August 1815.

== Fate ==
Bulwark was broken up at Portsmouth on 26 September 1826.
