= USS Adams (1799) =

American warship

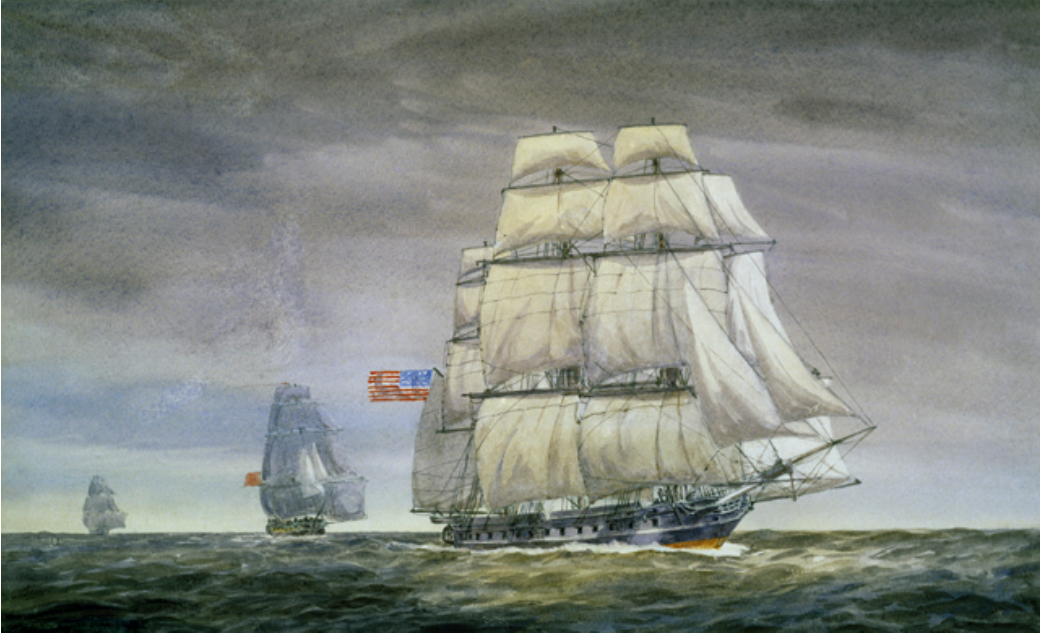
- The Escape of the Adams, 10 July 1814, by Irwin John Bevan

History

United States
- Name: USS Adams
- Builder: John Jackson and William Sheffield
- Cost: $76,622
- Laid down: 30 July 1798
- Launched: 8 June 1799
- Commissioned: 23 September 1799
- Fate: Scuttled 3 September 1814

General characteristics
- Type: Frigate
- Tonnage: 530 in June 1812 725 American ton or 783 English ton
- Length: Originally 128 feet, or 108, when built. Lengthened to 143 feet in 1812.
- Beam: 34 ft (10 m)
- Depth of hold: 10 feet, 9 inches
- Complement: 220 officers and men
- Armament: in 1800 24 × 12-pounder guns; 14 × 9-pounder guns; in June 1812 26 × 18-pounder columbiads; 1 × 12-pounder gun on quarterdeck

USS Adams was a 28-gun (rated) sailing frigate of the United States Navy. She was laid down in 1797 at New York City by John Jackson and William Sheffield and launched on 8 June 1799. Captain Richard Valentine Morris took command of the ship.

== Quasi-War with France ==
The frigate departed New York in mid-September 1799 and headed for the West Indies to protect American shipping from attacks by French privateers, during the Quasi-War with France. She arrived at Saint Christopher on 10 October and soon began cruising nearby waters in search of French men of war and any prizes which had been captured by warships flying French colors.

Later that month, she recaptured the brig Zylpha and assisted USS Insurgent in taking an unidentified 4-gun French privateer and freeing an English brig and a schooner from Boston which that vessel had seized.

On 12 November, she again teamed with Insurgent in recapturing the 14-gun English brig Margaret. On the 20th, they cooperated in liberating the schooner Nancy off Guadeloupe which had struck her colors on the 18th. On 20 November off Guadeloupe they recaptured schooner "Nancy", captured on 18 November by a French privateer. On 15 December, she took the French privateer Le Onze Vendémiaire.

On 10 January 1800, Adams and USS Eagle made the French schooner La Fougeuse their prize and, late in the month, Adams recaptured the schooner Alphia. Sometime in January she captured schooner "Le Gambeaux". French schooner L'Heureuse Rencontre was captured, and privateer "General Massena" also, and "Isabella", a prize of Berceau was recaptured, in February. The following month, she freed the sloop Nonpareil and she did the same for the schooner Priscilla in April.

But Adams most successful month came in May when she recaptured an unidentified schooner and teamed up with Insurgent once more in freeing a British letter of marque. During the same month she also recaptured schooner Nancy, schooner Grinder(There is an unclear reference to HMS Unity in connection to this ship), and an unidentified brig, she captured the brig Dove and the schooner Renomie.

In need of repairs, Adams returned to New York on 3 June 1800, after briefly running aground off Cape Hatteras, On 18 August Capt. Thomas Robinson was made her new Captain replacing Capt. Morris. Early in the fall she headed back to the Caribbean. However, on this cruise she did not have the success which she had enjoyed under Capt. Richard Morris but for the most part was limited to patrol and escort duty. She did manage to recapture the British schooner Grendin, but the date of the action is unknown. On 23 March 1801, the Secretary of the Navy ordered her home. She arrived prior to 7 June and was laid up at New York.

== First Barbary War ==
However, trouble in the Mediterranean prevented her respite from being long. The Barbary states on the northern coast of Africa were capturing American merchantmen attempting to trade in that ancient sea and enslaving their crews. Capt. Edward Preble was ordered to New York to take command by the Navy Secretary on 12 January, 1802. In a letter dated 13 April, 1802 Preble asked for a furlough due to a rapid decline in his health since arriving in New York in January. His request was granted in a letter dated 16 April. Capt. Hugh G. Campbell was ordered to take command in a letter dated 17 April. On 10 June 1802, she departed New York and headed for the Strait of Gibraltar carrying orders for Commodore Richard V. Morris, her first commanding officer who was now in command of the American Mediterranean Squadron. She arrived there on 22 July and remained in that port blockading the Tripolitan cruiser Meshuda lest she escape and prey on American shipping. It was not until 8 April 1803 that she was freed of this duty. She then joined the rest of Morris' squadron in operations off Tripoli.

However, as a squadron commander, Morris seemed to have lost the dash and daring he had displayed in operations against the French in the West Indies while in command of a single ship. His indecisiveness in the Mediterranean prompted Washington to order his recall and he sailed for home in Adams on 25 September. The frigate carried Morris to Washington, arriving 15 November, 1803 and was placed in ordinary at the navy yard.

== 1805–1811 ==
Capt. Alexander Murray was ordered to take command in a letter dated 9 July 1805. Adams cruised along the coast of the United States from New York to Florida protecting American commerce. In the autumn of the following year she was again laid up in Washington and – but for service enforcing the Embargo Act in 1809 – remained inactive at the nation's capital until the outbreak of the War of 1812. In August 1811 she became the receiving ship at the Washington Navy Yard.

== War of 1812 ==
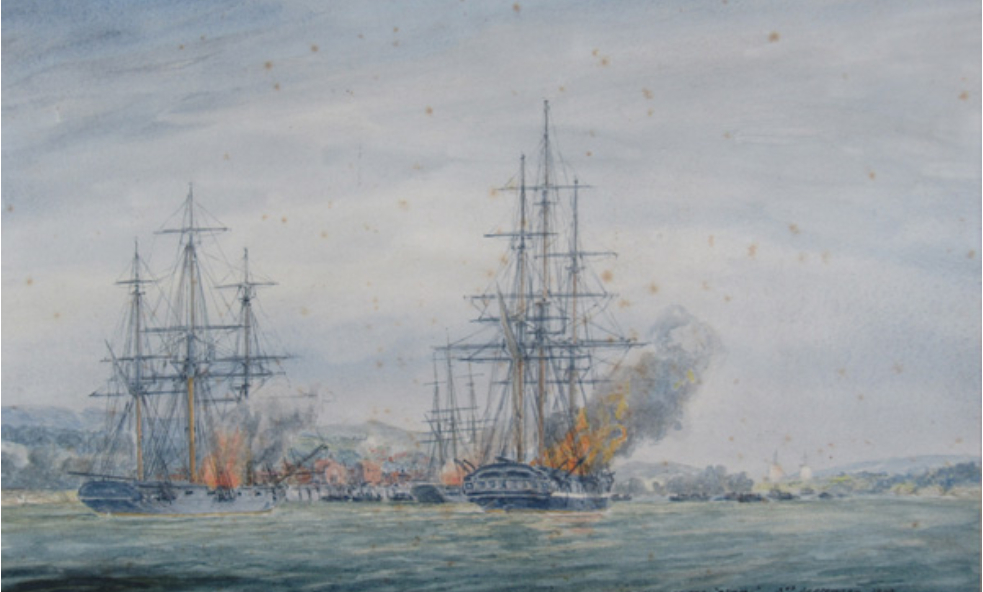
Adams being scuttled on 3 September 1814 during the Battle of Hampden

In June 1812, Adams was cut in half amidships and lengthened 15 feet in the course of being completely rebuilt as a sloop-of-war of 26 × 18-pounder guns. Commanded by Capt. Charles Morris, she was ready for action by the end of the year, but was bottled up in the Chesapeake Bay by blockading British warships until she finally managed to slip out to sea on 18 January 1814. She cruised in the eastern Atlantic and along the African coast and took five merchantmen prizes before putting in at Savannah, Georgia, in April.

Underway again in May, she headed for the Newfoundland Banks and ultimately sailed eastward to waters off the British Isles. During this cruise, she took five more merchant ships chased two more into the River Shannon, and barely managed to escape from a much larger British warship. She captured Woodbridge, which was sailing from India to Britain, but had to give her up when HMS Dannemark and HMS Albacore arrived on the scene while escorting a convoy to the Brazils.

Near the end of her homeward passage, Adams ran aground on the Isle au Haut on 17 August 1814 and was damaged seriously. Skillful seamanship aided by a rising tide managed to refloat the ship and despite heavy leaking she made it into the Penobscot River and reached Hampden, Maine (then part of the District of Maine under Massachusetts). There on 3 September 1814, during the Battle of Hampden, she was scuttled and set ablaze to prevent capture by a British squadron under the command of Rear-Admiral Edward Griffiths supporting British offensive operations in Maine. The crew largely escaped, walking overland to Portsmouth, New Hampshire.

== See also ==
- List of sailing frigates of the United States Navy
- Bibliography of early United States naval history

== Further Information ==
- "Ships Histories: The first USS Adams". Dictionary of American Naval Fighting Ships. Naval Historical Center.
