= John Coape Sherbrooke =

British Army officer and colonial administrator (1764–1830)

General Sir John Coape Sherbrooke GCB
- Portrait by Robert Field, 1816
- Born: 29 April 1764; Oxton, Nottinghamshire
- Died: 14 February 1830 (aged 65); Calverton, Nottinghamshire
- Spouse: Katherina Pyndar (m. 1811)
- Military career
- Allegiance: Great Britain; United Kingdom
- Branch: British Army
- Service years: 1780–1830
- Rank: General
- Units: 4th Regiment of Foot; 85th Regiment of Foot
- Commands: 33rd Regiment of Foot; Royal Sicilian Regiment; 1st Division
- Conflicts: American War of Independence; French Revolutionary Wars; Flanders campaign; Battle of Boxtel; Fourth Anglo-Mysore War; Siege of Seringapatam (1799); Napoleonic Wars; Hanover Expedition; Peninsular War; Second Battle of Porto; Battle of Talavera; War of 1812; Battle of Hampden
- Awards: Knight Grand Cross of the Order of the Bath

General Sir John Coape Sherbrooke, GCB (29 April 1764 – 14 February 1830) was a British Army officer and colonial administrator. Serving in Nova Scotia, the Low Countries, India, the Mediterranean and Spain, he was appointed Lieutenant-Governor of Nova Scotia in 1811. During the War of 1812 Sherbrooke's policies along with his victory at the Battle of Hampden led to significant prosperity in Nova Scotia.

== Early life ==
John Coape Sherbrooke was born in Oxton, Nottinghamshire, on 29 April 1764, the third son of the wealthy country squire William Coape JP and his wife Sarah Sherbrooke. The surname comes from Shirebrook, Derbyshire. Upon his marriage Sherbrooke's father had taken his wife's surname as his own.

== Army career ==
=== Early career ===
Sherbrooke joined the British Army as an ensign in the 4th Regiment of Foot on 7 December 1780. He was promoted to lieutenant on 22 December 1781 and then transferred to the 85th Regiment of Foot when Sherbrooke was promoted a captain on 6 March 1783. The end of the American War of Independence led to the British army being reduced in size, resulting the 85th Foot being disbanded. As such, on 23 June 1785 Sherbrooke transferred to the 33rd Regiment of Foot then stationed in Halifax, Nova Scotia. He returned to England in 1786. When Britain became involved in the French Revolutionary Wars in February 1793 Sherbrooke was still a captain but was soon promoted to major and again in May 1794 to lieutenant colonel. Serving as a second-in-command to Colonel Arthur Wellesley, he served in the Flanders campaign between March 1793 and April 1795, fighting in the Battle of Boxtel on 13 September 1794 before participating in the retreat towards north-west Germany in late 1794.

After an attempt to join the West Indies campaign in October 1795 was aborted due to large storms in the English Channel Sherbrooke and his regiment were instead sent to serve in British India, arriving at Calcutta in February 1797. Sherbrooke was promoted to colonel on 1 January 1798 and fought in the Fourth Anglo-Mysore War, participating in the final defeat of Tipu Sultan at the siege of Seringapatam on 4 May 1799. His service in India was cut short when he fell ill with malaria which forced him to return to England, doing so in 1800. Sherbrooke's break in service was exacerbated by the Peace of Amiens in 1802, at which point he went on half-pay.

The peace ended in May 1803 with the start of the Napoleonic Wars and Sherbrooke accordingly resumed active service, being given command of the 4th Battalion of the Army of Reserve, a home defence force created in 1803 as part of British anti-invasion preparations. Sherbrooke's new command was stationed at Norman Cross Prison. He was promoted to major general on 1 January 1805 and served under Wellesley in the Hanover Expedition between 8 November and 15 February. In June Sherbrooke was transferred to Sicily where he served as a subordinate to Lieutenant-general Sir John Moore and commanded at Messina; most of the troops (and Moore) were withdrawn from Sicily in October 1807, leaving Sherbrooke in command of British interests on the island. Sherbrooke became colonel of the Royal Sicilian Regiment in February 1807. While the court of Ferdinand I urged Sherbrooke to make offensive manoeuvres towards mainland Italy with his troops, he instead began to improve Sicily's defences and prepare for a possible French invasion. He left the island in June 1808, having been superseded by Lieutenant-general Sir John Stuart.

=== Peninsular War ===
Sherbrooke was next given command of 4,000 men to assist Spanish forces in Cádiz as part of the Peninsular War, in February 1809. The Spanish rejected British assistance and so his force was redirected to Lisbon where he joined the main British army commanded by Wellesley, soon to become Lord Wellington. Sherbrooke was promoted to lieutenant-general on 12 April and was the second-most senior general in the British army in Spanish behind Wellington. He fought at the Second Battle of Porto on 12 May with a formation of men that on 18 June was designated the 1st Division. The same month as the Second Battle of Porto, Sherbrooke became colonel of the 68th Regiment of Foot. With his division Sherbrooke fought at the Battle of Talavera in July where he successfully fought off the attacks of the French infantry but then lost control of three of his brigades in the subsequent charge, leaving a dangerous gap in the British line.

At Talavera, Sherbrooke's 1st Division included four brigades: Henry Frederick Campbell's British Guards – 2,045 men, Alan Cameron of Erracht's British regulars – 1,364, Ernst Langwerth's King's German Legion (KGL) – 1,388, and Sigismund von Löw's KGL – 1,167. Early on 28 July 1809, the numerically superior French artillery took the British positions under fire. While in one sector, British units were withdrawn out of sight from the French guns, Sherbrooke's division occupied an exposed position and suffered casualties before gunsmoke hid its position. The main French attack occurred at 3:00 pm when the French divisions of Pierre Belon Lapisse and Horace Sebastiani advanced against the 1st Division. Sherbrooke ordered his infantry not to fire until the French came within 50 yd (46 m) and then to charge. These orders were carried out to the letter, causing tremendous casualties and compelling the French to hastily retreat. Sherbrooke forgot to warn his officers not to advance too far and all the brigades except Cameron's recklessly rushed after their fleeing enemies. When the disordered Guards and the KGL came up against the intact French second line, it was their turn to take to their heels as the fresh French foot soldiers counterattacked. The day was saved by the appearance of John Randoll Mackenzie's reserve brigade and the 1st Battalion of the 48th Foot. Sherbrooke's routed troops quickly rallied behind the reinforcements and, after an extended exchange of musketry, the French counterattack was defeated. Losses were ghastly on both sides. Sebastiani's division suffered 2,100 casualties out of 8,000 while Lapisse's division lost 1,700 men out of 6,800, including Lapisse killed. In Sherbrooke's division, Langwerth was killed and his brigade reduced to 650 men, Löw's brigade lost 350 men, Cameron's brigade lost 500 men, and the Guards sustained 611 casualties. Mackenzie was killed and his brigade lost 632 men.

Sherbrooke commanded the 1st Division through the retreat to Portugal, where he threatened to hang his commissary officer if he did not provide the required food for his division, and for his service at Porto and Talavera was appointed a Knight Commander of the Order of the Bath in September. A recurrence of Sherbrooke's malaria forced him to resign his command on 26 April 1810 and he was appointed Lieutenant Governor of Nova Scotia on 19 August 1811.

=== War of 1812 ===
Sherbrooke arrived at Halifax on 16 October 1811, as military commander of the Provinces of Nova-Scotia, New-Brunswick, and their Dependencies, including the Islands of Newfoundland, Cape Breton, Prince Edward and Bermuda. The area of command was referred to as the Halifax Command or Nova Scotia Command.

When the War of 1812 began Sherbrooke initially fought a phoney war, allowing trade to continue with Maine to the benefit of British merchants. Having complained at the lack of defences available to protect the colony and that the extant fortifications were dilapidated, he mounted guns at harbour entrances across the colony and placed the militias in a state of readiness to repel attacks. Sherbrooke's tactic of informally continuing trade with the neighbouring American states while still making sure that his own territory was amply protected provided an opportunity for the Atlantic-facing provinces of Canada to enhance their place in international trade; they were able to flourish at a time when other areas were stifled by war.

When the Napoleonic Wars ended in April 1814 more troops were made available for North America; Sherbrooke used this opportunity to attack the disputed area of Maine between Passamaquoddy Bay and the Penobscot River, landing an expeditionary force of 2,000 men at Castine that August and proceeding to subdue the area between the Penobscot and St Croix rivers. He renamed the region the royal colony of New Ireland. Sherbrooke was able to collect customs dues while he occupied Castine, and these funds were in later years used to finance the Cambridge Military Library in Halifax and to create Dalhousie College. New Ireland remained under the control of Britain until April 1815, although Sherbrooke himself only stayed there for four weeks, when the Treaty of Ghent restored it to the United States. For his service during the war he was elevated to Knight Grand Cross of the Order of the Bath.

While the majority of Sherbrooke's tenure as Lieutenant Governor of Nova Scotia was spent concentrating on the war, he also made a significant effort to increase support for the Church of England, as most of the population were dissenters. While largescale changes were voted down by the Nova Scotia House of Assembly, he provided small sums of money for the Church via taxation and allotted undeveloped land to it for the construction of religious buildings. At the same time Sherbrooke was aware that his support of the Church was not popular and so he held a careful balance between the two religious factions, ensuring for example that religious appointments were taken up by moderates and not zealots.

=== British North America ===
His active defence of the colony during the War of 1812 combined with his proven ability to work competently with the civilian population led to his appointment as Governor General of British North America (fully Captain General and Governor in Chief in and over the Provinces of Lower-Canada, Upper-Canada, Nova Scotia, New-Brunswick, and their several dependencies, Vice-Admiral of the same, Lieutenant-General and Commander of all His Majesty’s Forces in the said Provinces of Lower-Canada & Upper-Canada, Nova-Scotia and New-Brunswick, and their several dependencies, and in the Islands of Newfoundland, Prince Edward, Cape Breton, and Bermuda, &c. &c. &c) in 1816. His talent as a mediator helped settle disputes between the Francophone and English political factions; he formed a good relationship with the leader of the Francophone faction, Bishop Joseph-Octave Plessis, but at the same time cemented the position of the Chief Justice of Lower Canada Jonathan Sewell although Plessis' faction had impeached him. Similarly, he won the confidence of Louis-Joseph Papineau by providing him with a permanent salary but made sure to not show favour by doing the same for Sewell.

== Retirement and death ==
Sherbrooke continued to work actively into 1817, concentrating on reforming the colony's public finances, but once again was set back by his failing health. He found that the cold Canadian winters helped bring on recurrences of his malaria, and also suffered a paralytic stroke on 6 February 1818. He handed over his duties to Charles Lennox, 4th Duke of Richmond on 30 July and sailed for home. He reached England in September and spent much time recuperating at the spas of Bath and Cheltenham while living at Calverton in Nottinghamshire. He was promoted to general on 27 May 1825 and died at Calverton on 14 February 1830.

== Family ==
Sherbrooke married Katherina (died 15 May 1856), the daughter of Reginald Pyndar, rector of Madresfield, on 24 August 1811 at Areley Kings. They had no children of their own, but had adopted a boy in 1813.

== Personality and legacy ==
Sherbrooke was well-known for his short temper and abrasive language, with Wellington noting that he was the most passionate man he had ever met. Henry Edward Bunbury said of him that:

"the brigade he commanded winced a little under the sharpness of his discipline, while they revenged themselves by comical stories of his rough sayings and impetuous temper...A short, square, hardy little man, with a countenance that told at once the determined fortitude of his nature. Without genius, without education, hot as pepper, and rough in his language, but with a warm heart and generous feelings; true, straight forward, scorning finesse and craft and meanness, and giving vent to his detestation with boiling eagerness, and in the plainest terms. As an officer, full of energy, rousing others to exertion, and indefatigable in his own person."

While he resided in Nova Scotia, his home was at Birch Cove on Bedford Basin, near Halifax. Named Sherwood, it eventually lent its name to the neighbourhoods of Sherwood Park and Sherwood Heights. The community of Sherbrooke, Nova Scotia also bears his name. Other honorific eponyms are listed below:

Geographic locations

- Nova Scotia: Sherbrooke
- Nova Scotia: New Ross, formerly known as Sherbrooke
- Quebec: Sherbrooke
- Quebec: Rue Sherbrooke, Montreal

Buildings

- Quebec: Sherbrooke Station, Montreal
- Sherbrooke Martello Tower (1814–1828; four guns), at McNabs Cove, opposite York Redoubt at Halifax harbour.
- Fort Sherbrooke (Maine)

Vessels

- Sir John Sherbrooke
- Sir John Sherbrooke
- Barbados

== See also ==
- Military history of Nova Scotia
- The Sherbrooke Hussars

== Citations ==
Political offices
Preceded by Alexander Croke	Lieutenant Governor of Nova Scotia; 1811–1816	Succeeded by George Stracey Smyth (acting)
Preceded by Sir George Prevost	Governor General of British North America; 1816–1818	Succeeded by The Duke of Richmond
Military offices
Preceded by Sir Thomas Trigge	Colonel of the 68th (Durham) Regiment of Foot (Light Infantry); 1809–1813	Succeeded by Sir Henry Warde
