= John Foster Williams =

- Born: October 12, 1743; Boston, Massachusetts
- Died: June 24, 1814 (aged 70); Boston, Massachusetts
- Allegiance: United States
- Service / branch: Massachusetts State Navy; Revenue-Marine
- Battles / wars: American Revolutionary War

Captain John Foster Williams (12 October 1743 – 24 June 1814) was a Massachusetts State Navy officer who served in the American Revolutionary War before later becoming an officer in the Revenue-Marine.

== Career ==
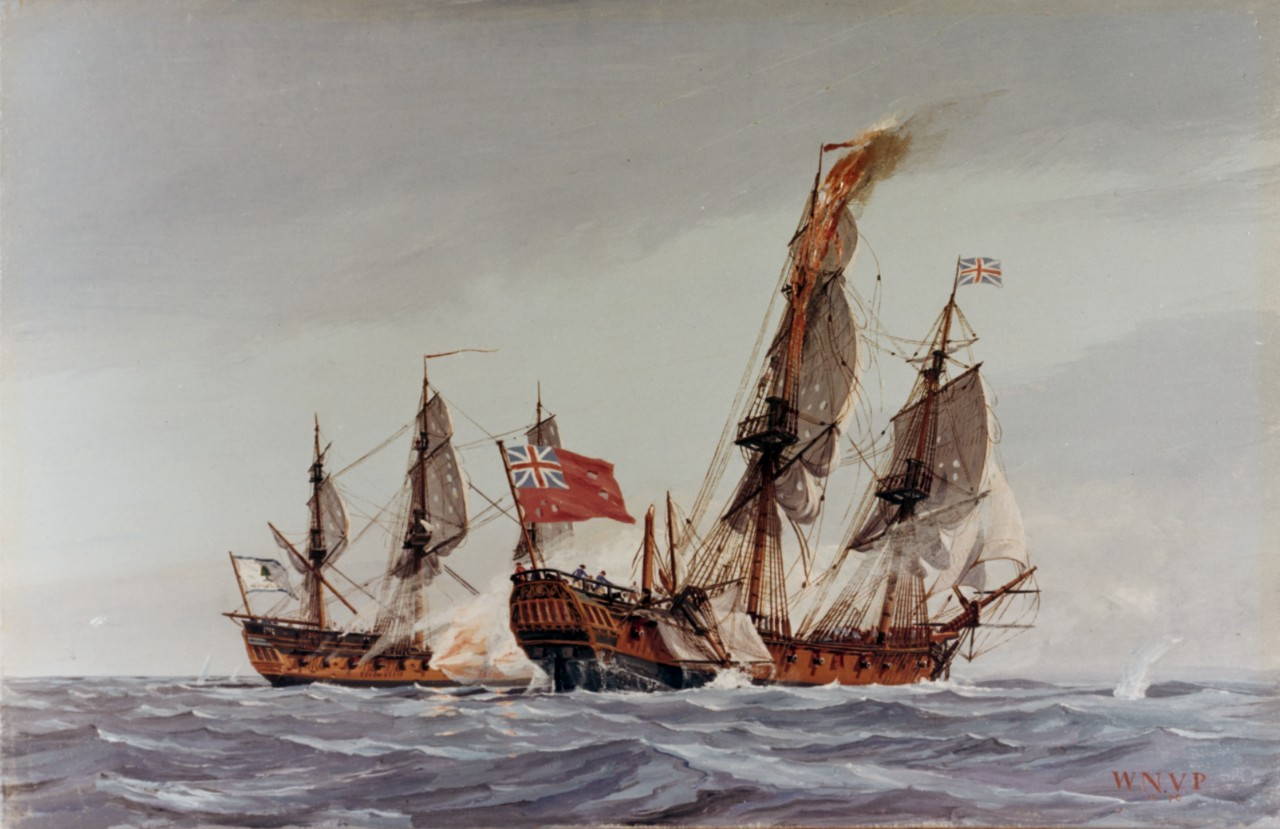
Painting of Protector engaging Admiral Duff by William Nowland Van Powell

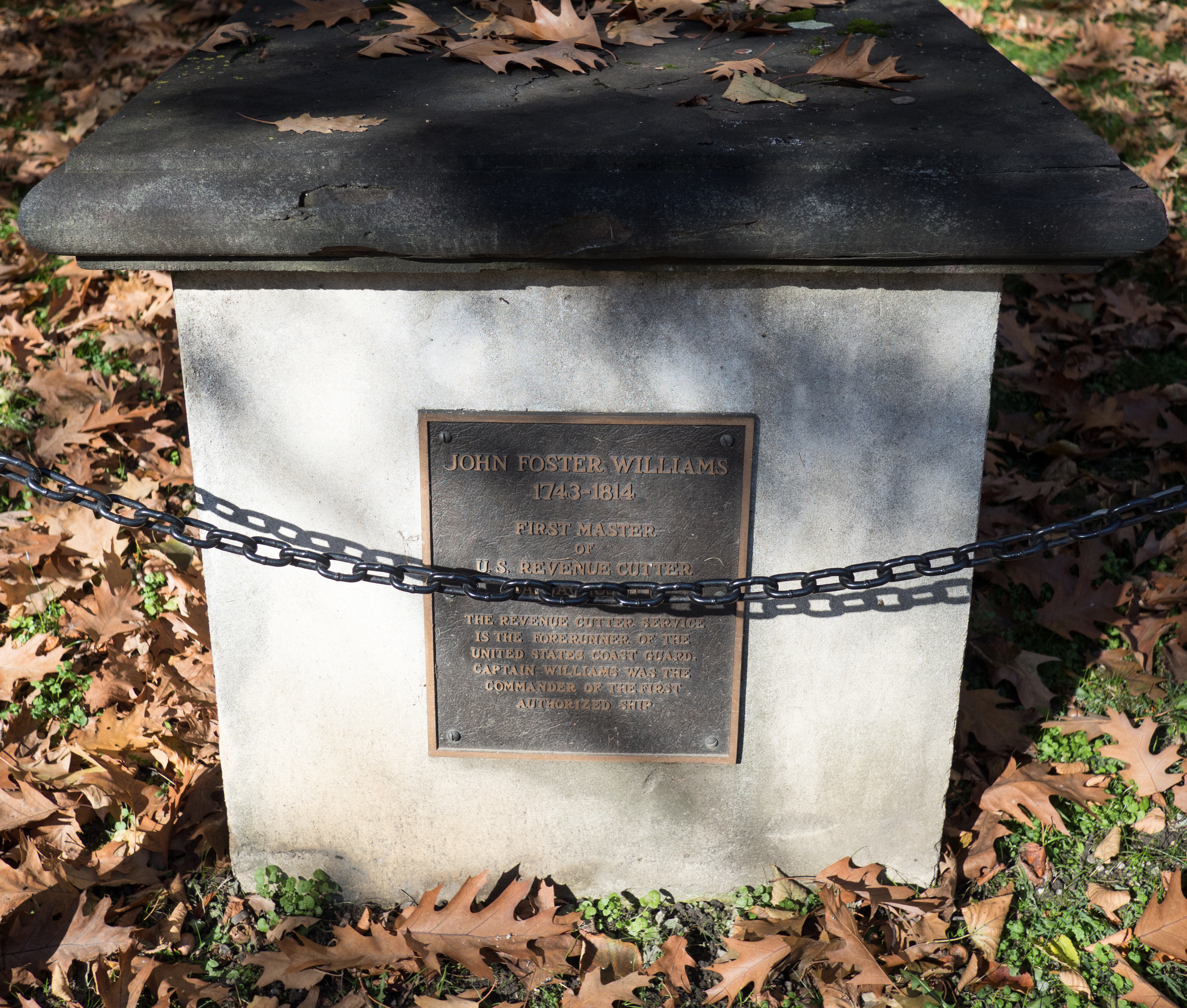
Williams' grave at the Granary Burying Ground in Boston

Williams was commissioned a captain in the Massachusetts State Navy and received command of the brig Hazard late in 1777. In the following year, he took her to sea in a fruitless search for British West Indiamen; but he and his ship eventually achieved success in 1779. While cruising in the West Indies, Hazard fell in with the privateer brigantine Active on 16 March. At the end of a "smart action" of 35-minutes' duration, "yard arm to yard arm," Active struck her colors and became Hazard's prize, after having suffered 13 killed and 20 wounded out of her 95-man crew. Hazard sent the captured brigantine back to Massachusetts under a prize crew and subsequently returned home in April, after taking several other prizes. In May, Hazard returned to sea, this time in company with the brig Tyrannicide. At 0830 on 15 June, the two ships fell in with two British ships and—after a short, sharp engagement—forced both vessels to strike their colors. Later that summer, Hazard—like the rest of the Massachusetts Navy—took part in the ill-fated Penobscot expedition, an operation which eventually cost the state's navy all of its commissioned vessels.

Williams received command of the new 28-gun frigate Protector in the spring of 1780 and took her to sea in June. In accordance with instructions from the Board of War, the new warship cruised in the vicinity of the Newfoundland Banks, on the lookout for British merchantmen. Her vigilance was rewarded early in June.

At 0700 on 9 June 1780, Protector spotted a strange ship bearing down on her, flying British colors. At 1100, the Continental frigate, also flying British colors, hailed the stranger and found her to be the 32-gun privateer Admiral Duff, bound for London from St. Kitts. When the enemy's identity had been ascertained, Protector hauled down British colors and ran up the Continental flag—opening fire almost simultaneously. The action ensued for the next hour and one-half, until Admiral Duff caught fire and exploded, leaving 55 survivors for Protector to rescue soon thereafter.

With the coming of peace, Williams returned to his native Boston. Because of rampant smuggling and the need for enforcement of tariff laws, upon the urging of Secretary of Treasury Alexander Hamilton, the United States Congress created the Revenue-Marine on 4 August 1790. Under the enabling legislation that authorized the Revenue-Marine, a "System of Cutters", consisting of ten ships, were initially ordered and constructed. John Foster Williams was commissioned as a Revenue-Marine officer by President George Washington 21 March 1791 and given oversight of construction of the cutter Massachusetts which he later commanded. After Massachusetts was determined to be too slow for her assigned tasks she was decommissioned and Massachusetts II was constructed and commissioned in 1793; Williams was chosen as master.

== Later life and death ==
Williams died in Boston on 24 June 1814.

== Legacy ==
- The ship USS Williams (DD-108) was named for him.
