= Weymouth, Massachusetts =

- City
- Town of Weymouth
- South Weymouth, one of the four village centers of Weymouth

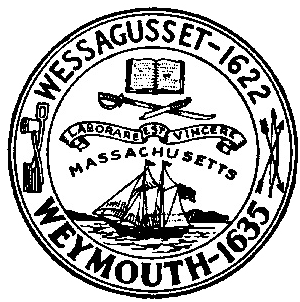
- Seal
- Motto: Latin: Laborare Est Vincere ("To Work Is to Conquer")
- Location of Weymouth in Norfolk County, Massachusetts
- Coordinates: 42°13′15″N 70°56′25″W
- Country: United States
- State: Massachusetts
- County: Norfolk
- Settled: 1622
- Incorporated: September 2, 1635

Government
  - Type: Mayor-council
  - Mayor: Mike Molisse (D)

Area
  - Total: 21.58 sq mi (55.88 km^{2})
  - Land: 16.76 sq mi (43.42 km^{2})
  - Water: 4.81 sq mi (12.45 km^{2})
- Elevation: 89 ft (27 m)

Population (2020)
  - Total: 57,437
  - Density: 3,426.0/sq mi (1,322.79/km^{2})
- Demonym: Weymouthite
- Time zone: UTC−5 (Eastern)
  - Summer (DST): UTC−4 (Eastern)
- ZIP Codes: 02188–02191
- Area code: 339/781
- FIPS code: 25-78865
- GNIS feature ID: 0619462
- Website: www.weymouth.ma.us

Weymouth is a city in Norfolk County, Massachusetts, United States. It is one of 13 municipalities in the state to have city forms of government while retaining "town of" in their official names. It is named after Weymouth, Dorset, a coastal town in England, and is the second-oldest settlement in Massachusetts, second only to Plymouth. Weymouth is one of the more affordable towns relative to the South Shore and offers a short commute into Boston, MBTA bus and rail service, and a town beach.

At the 2020 census, Weymouth had a total population of 57,437. It also had a crime rate of 12.42 per 1,000 residents.

== Demographics ==
Historical population
Year	Pop.	±%
1790	1,469	—
1840	3,738	+154.5%
1850	5,369	+43.6%
1860	7,742	+44.2%
1870	9,010	+16.4%
1880	10,570	+17.3%
1890	10,866	+2.8%
1900	11,324	+4.2%
1910	12,895	+13.9%
1920	15,057	+16.8%
1930	20,882	+38.7%
1940	23,868	+14.3%
1950	32,690	+37.0%
1960	48,177	+47.4%
1970	54,610	+13.4%
1980	55,601	+1.8%
1990	54,063	−2.8%
2000	53,988	−0.1%
2010	53,743	−0.5%
2020	57,437	+6.9%
2024*	60,159	+4.7%
* = population estimate. Source: United States census records and Population Estimates Program data. Source: U.S. Decennial Census

As of the 2010 census, there were 53,743 people, 22,435 households, and 13,595 families residing in the city. The population density was 3,174.2 inhabitants per square mile (1,225.6/km^{2}). There were 22,573 housing units at an average density of 1,327.1 per square mile (512.4/km^{2}). 64% housing units were owner-occupied and 35% of housing units were renter-occupied. The racial makeup of the city was 82.7% White, 5.2% Black or African American, 0.2% Native American, 5.7% Asian, 0.0% Pacific Islander, 0.6% from other races, and 2.2% from two or more races. Hispanic or Latino of any race were 3.1% of the population.

There were 22,028 households, out of which 27.3% had children under the age of 18 living with them, 48.6% were married couples living together, 10.3% had a female householder with no husband present, and 26.8% were non-families, 37% of which were non-family households with residents over 65 years of age. 30.6% of all households were made up of individuals, and 11.1% had someone living alone who was 65 years of age or older. The average household size was 2.42 and the average family size was 3.08.

In the city, the population was spread out, with 22.0% under the age of 18, 6.6% from 18 to 24, 32.7% from 25 to 44, 23.4% from 45 to 64, and 15.4% who were 65 years of age or older. The median age was 38 years. For every 100 females, there were 90.4 males. For every 100 females age 18 and over, there were 86.3 males.

The median income for a household in the city was $68,665, and the median income for a family was $52,083. Males had a median income of $42,497 versus $35,963 for females. The per capita income for was $24,976. About 9.1% of families and 9.8% of the population were below the poverty line, including 8.3% of those under age 18 and 9.4% of those age 65 or over.

Weymouth has the 10th highest Irish population in the United States, at 33%. As "white flight" occurred in inner-city Boston exacerbated by the start of the cross-district busing program, in the 1960s and 70s thousands of white (predominantly of Irish descent) Bostonians moved to middle/working class suburbs such as Weymouth and Quincy. The blue collar city culture of places like South Boston and Dorchester is prevalent in the neighborhoods of Weymouth. Weymouth has colloquially been referred to as "Suburban Southie" and "Southie on the South Shore" due to the high influx of South Boston residents and Irish Catholic culture in the town. This trend continues in a different way again today as some longtime South Boston residents are now being priced out due to gentrification. Many are moving out to the more affordable towns on the South Shore.

=== Demographic breakdown by ZIP code ===
==== Income ====
Data is from the 2009–2013 American Community Survey 5-Year Estimates.

Rank	ZIP Code (ZCTA)	Per capita income	Median household income	Median family income	Population	Number of households
	Norfolk County	$44,692	$84,916	$108,943	677,296	257,451
1	02190 (South Weymouth)	$36,124	$77,329	$98,442	16,733	6,719
2	02188 (Weymouth Landing)	$35,954	$68,366	$80,799	14,655	6,220
	Massachusetts	$35,763	$66,866	$84,900	7,001,399	2,530,147
	Weymouth	$32,832	$68,113	$81,987	57,410	22,526
3	02191 (North Weymouth)	$31,652	$64,365	$86,588	8,369	3,558
4	02189 (East Weymouth)	$29,185	$60,059	$78,079	14,609	6,029
	United States	$28,155	$53,046	$64,719	334,914,895	115,610,216

== Geography and environment ==
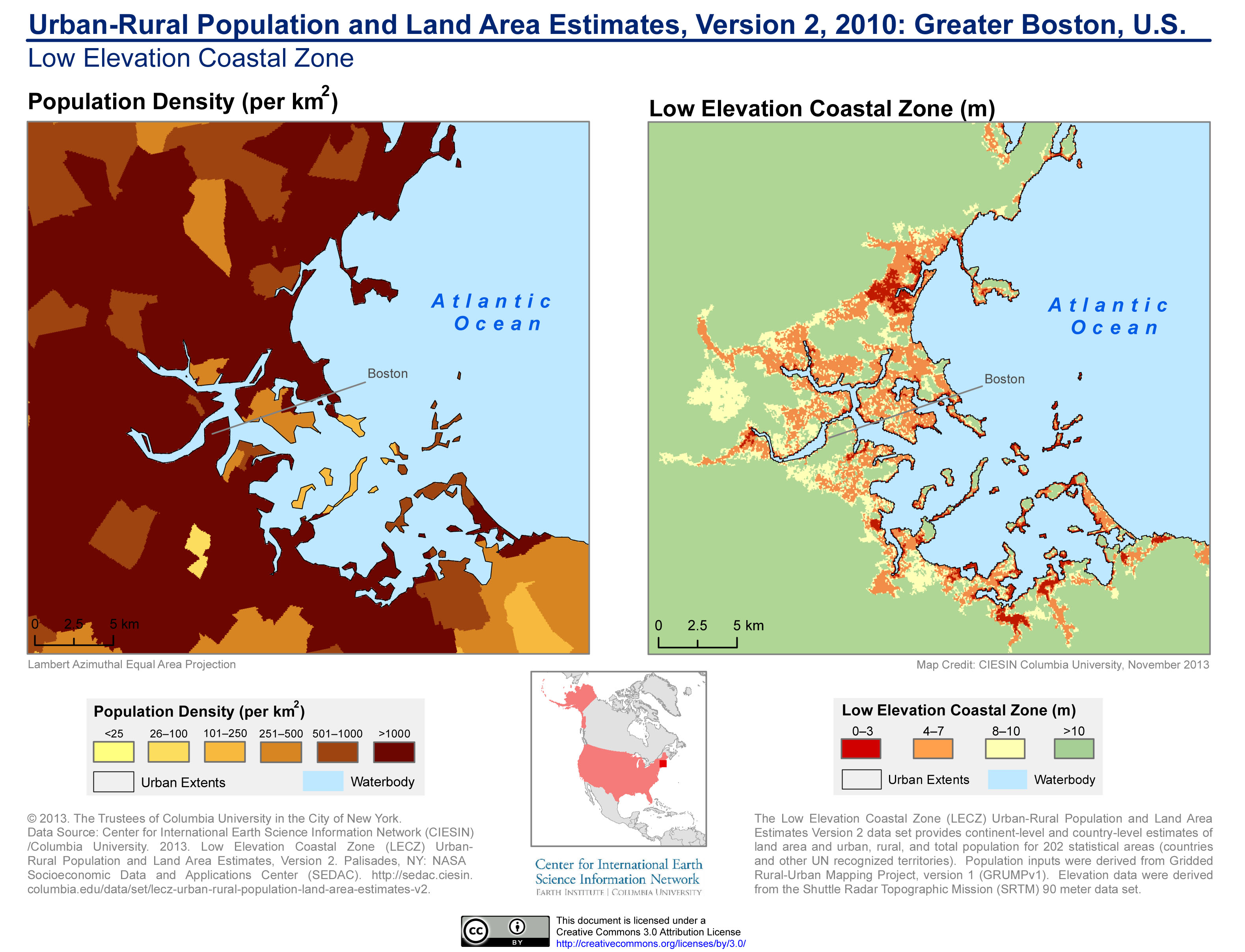
Population density and elevation above sea level in Greater Boston (2010). Weymouth is especially vulnerable to sea level rise.

Weymouth is located at 42°12′23″N 70°56′45″W (42.206458, −70.945919).

According to the United States Census Bureau, the city has an area of 21.6 square miles (56 km^{2}), of which 17 square miles (44 km^{2}) is land and 4.6 square miles (12 km^{2}) (comprising 21.29%) is water.

Weymouth contains the Weymouth Back River and the Weymouth Fore River; its surroundings, formerly industrial, are now set aside as parks and natural areas, including Webb Memorial State Park. There are many streets named after people and trees.

Weymouth residents often designate which of four "districts" they live in:

- North Weymouth is considered anything north of the intersection of Church Street, North Street and Green Street. Some of the sites around North Weymouth are Great Esker Park, George Lane Beach, Webb State Park, the Wessagusset Yacht Club, Boston skyline views, and the Abigail Adams Historical Society. Historically North Weymouth was a blue collar area, However, recently it has started to include up-and-coming waterfront property that rivals similar in pricier towns. Many small cottages are being bought up and redone on the waterfront. This is notable on streets such as Regatta Road. North Weymouth is the most densely populated area of the town.
- South Weymouth is mostly south of Route 3. South Weymouth is home to the former Naval Air base that is being redeveloped into residential and commercial properties and is one of the areas biggest development projects. South Shore Hospital and Weymouth High School are in South Weymouth. South Weymouth has its own town square called Columbian Square.
- East Weymouth is somewhat in the center of Weymouth, including Whitman's Pond, Jackson Square, and Town Hall. East Weymouth has several fine examples of Victorian homes, including Queen Anne, shingle, and colonial revival homes. Some particularly fine examples of these homes are being restored on Hillcrest Road. East Weymouth has many longtime working class residents who take pride in their hometown.
- Weymouth Landing spans a mile around Weston Park. After recent years of blight in the main commercial area it is being redeveloped. Weymouth Landing is the border between Weymouth and Braintree and is where the Fore River splits into tributaries.

Weymouth is bordered on the north by Hingham Bay and Boston Harbor. Weymouth's territory includes Grape Island, Slate Island, and Sheep Island, all part of the Boston Harbor Islands National Recreation Area. Weymouth is bordered on the west by Quincy, Braintree, and Holbrook, on the south by Abington and Rockland and on the east by Hingham.

=== Climate ===
The climate in this area is characterized by hot, humid summers and generally mild to cool winters. According to the Köppen Climate Classification system, Weymouth has a humid subtropical climate, abbreviated "Cfa" on climate maps.

Climate data for Weymouth, Massachusetts
Month	Jan	Feb	Mar	Apr	May	Jun	Jul	Aug	Sep	Oct	Nov	Dec	Year
Mean daily maximum °F (°C)	39 (4)	42 (6)	49 (9)	59 (15)	70 (21)	79 (26)	85 (29)	83 (28)	75 (24)	65 (18)	54 (12)	43 (6)	61.9 (16.6)
Daily mean °F (°C)	30 (−1)	32 (0)	40 (4)	49 (9)	59 (15)	69 (21)	74 (23)	73 (23)	65 (18)	54 (12)	45 (7)	35 (2)	52.1 (11.2)
Mean daily minimum °F (°C)	21 (−6)	23 (−5)	30 (−1)	39 (4)	48 (9)	58 (14)	64 (18)	63 (17)	55 (13)	44 (7)	36 (2)	26 (−3)	42.2 (5.7)
Average precipitation inches (cm)	4 (10)	4 (10)	4 (10)	3.9 (9.9)	3.2 (8.1)	2.8 (7.1)	2.8 (7.1)	3.8 (9.7)	3.3 (8.4)	3.8 (9.7)	4.5 (11)	4.2 (11)	44.3 (113)
Source: Weatherbase

=== Wildlife ===
Weymouth is home to many species of wildlife that have adapted to the town's suburban environment and parks.

Small mammals such as Red and Gray foxes, Striped Skunks, Raccoons, Virginia Opossums, Eastern Cottontail Rabbits, Groundhogs, and Eastern Gray Squirrels can be commonly found in Weymouth. Some Larger mammals, such as Coyotes and White-tailed Deer live in the more forested areas such as Great Esker Park, and occasionally wander into the suburbs.

Weymouth is also home to many species of birds. Some common backyard species are Wild Turkeys, American Robins, Blue Jays, Mourning Doves, Black-capped Chickadees, Tufted Titmice, Common Grackles, and Northern Cardinals to name a few. There are many other species of birds that inhabit the diverse habitats that are located in Weymouth, such as Red-tailed Hawks, Ospreys, Red-winged Blackbirds, Great Egrets, Turkey Vultures, Great Blue Herons, along with various species of waterfowl, seagulls, and shorebirds. There are also two invasive bird species, those being the House Sparrow and European Starling.

The Herring Run runs through Weymouth, connecting the Back River to Whitman's Pond. Every spring, hundreds of thousands of Alewife Herring travel up the brook to spawn. The Herring Run was also a crucial resource for the early colonists of the area and the Native Massachusett People.

== Transportation ==
Weymouth is served by several MBTA bus routes as well as three MBTA Commuter Rail stations: two on the Greenbush Line at Weymouth Landing/East Braintree and East Weymouth, and one on the Kingston Line at South Weymouth. State routes that pass through Weymouth include Route 3, Route 3A, Route 18, Route 53, Route 58 and Route 139.

== Government ==
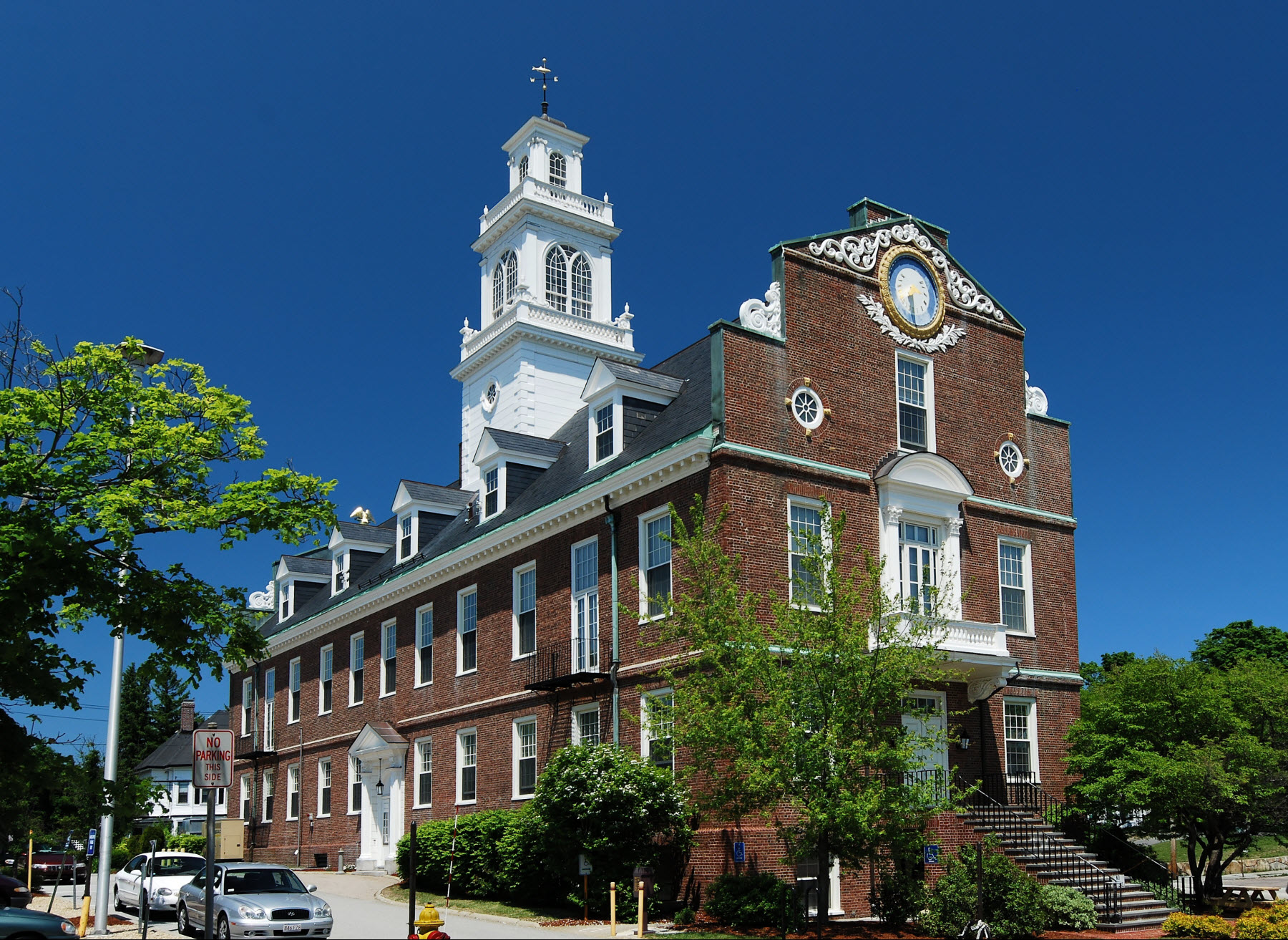
Town Hall, built in 1928 as a replica of Old State House in Boston

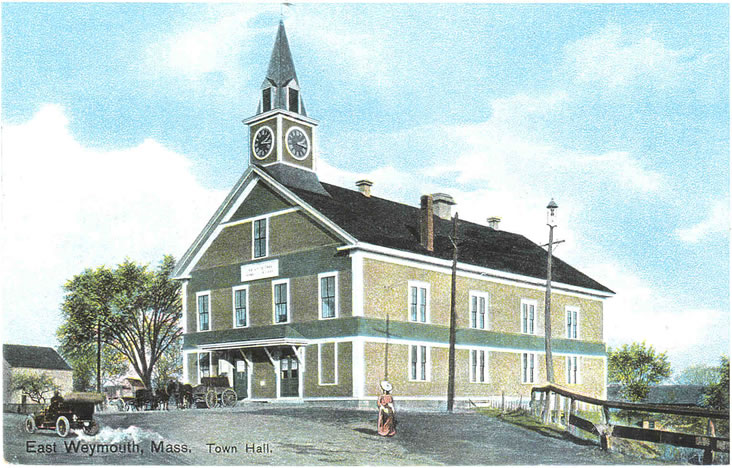
First Weymouth Town Hall. It was built in 1852 and destroyed by fire in 1914.

Weymouth was founded in 1635, from the territory known as Wessagusett which was described in 1622—just two years after the Pilgrims landed in Plymouth. Weymouth held the distinction of having the oldest continuous town meeting form of government, for 365 years. In 1999, Weymouth residents voted to change to a city form of government. David M. Madden was elected as the city's first mayor and took office in 2000.

On July 10, 2007, Mayor David M. Madden announced he would not seek reelection. In 2008, Susan Kay was elected as the new mayor of Weymouth.

On November 3, 2015, Republican state senator Bob Hedlund was elected as the new mayor of Weymouth, succeeding long-incumbent mayor Susan M. Kay. Hedlund assumed office on January 4, 2016.

Weymouth is part of the Massachusetts Senate's Plymouth and Norfolk district.

Weymouth is one of the few places in the United States where self-service gas stations are illegal. The ban was introduced in 1977.

Voter Registration and Party Enrollment as of February 1, 2025
Party	Number of Voters	Percentage
Democratic	9,946	23.01%
Republican	3,743	8.66%
Independent	29,169	67.49%
Other Political Designation	363	0.84%
Total	43,221	100%

== Education ==
Weymouth High School is the only public high school in Weymouth. Prior to 2005, grades eight and nine were housed in Weymouth Junior High while grades ten, eleven, and twelve comprised the High School. This changed with the construction of a new wing on the Junior High building in South Weymouth, which subsequently became the new Weymouth High School housing grades nine through twelve. More than 2,000 students attend the high school. A brand new athletic surface was completed in 2005, giving Weymouth High School an artificial turf field and a track surface.

There are two middle schools but only one is currently in use. They are named after local women: abolitionist Maria Weston Chapman and First Lady Abigail Adams.

The Maria Weston Chapman Middle School, locally known as "The New Chapman," replaced a previous building that had housed an identically named middle school and, previously, the town's North High School. The new school opened to students in September 2022.

The previous middle school, Abigail Adams Middle School, is currently undergoing renovations with school and town officials undecided about its future uses.

There are eight primary schools and one early childhood center, five of which are named after Weymouth's Congressional Medal of Honor recipients.

- Academy Avenue Primary School
- Frederick C. Murphy Primary School
- Thomas V. Nash Jr. Primary School
- Lawrence W. Pingree Primary School
- William Seach Primary School
- Ralph Talbot Primary School
- Thomas W. Hamilton School
- Wessagusset Primary School
- Elden H. Johnson Early Childhood Center

In June 2021, Weymouth High School was placed into a state program for schools or districts that disproportionately suspend nonwhite students or students with disabilities. Along with this, the New Maria Weston Chapman Middle School made local news on two separate occasions due to the violent behavior of students.

There is one Public Charter School which Weymouth is associated to

- South Shore Charter Public School (located in Norwell Massachusetts)

In addition, there are four private schools in Weymouth.

- South Shore Christian Academy, an independent, Christian, college preparatory day school for students in grades K–12. SSCA also operates a pre-school program.
- Sacred Heart Elementary School, a Catholic elementary school under the direction of the Archdiocese of Boston for grades Pre-K–4. This school is associated with St. Francis Xavier.
- First Baptist Christian, an elementary school for grades Pre-K–8, under the direction of the First Baptist Church of Weymouth.
- St. Francis Xavier, a Catholic elementary school under the direction of St. Francis Parish. This school is for grades 5–8 and is associated with Sacred Heart Elementary School

== History ==
=== Wessagusset colony ===
The area that is now Weymouth was settled in 1622 as Wessagusset Colony, founded by Thomas Weston, who had been the main financial backer of Plymouth Colony. The settlement was a failure, as the 60 men from London were ill-prepared for the hardships required for survival. They also may have lacked the motivation of the Pilgrims, as this colony was purely economic in motivation and the men had not brought their families.

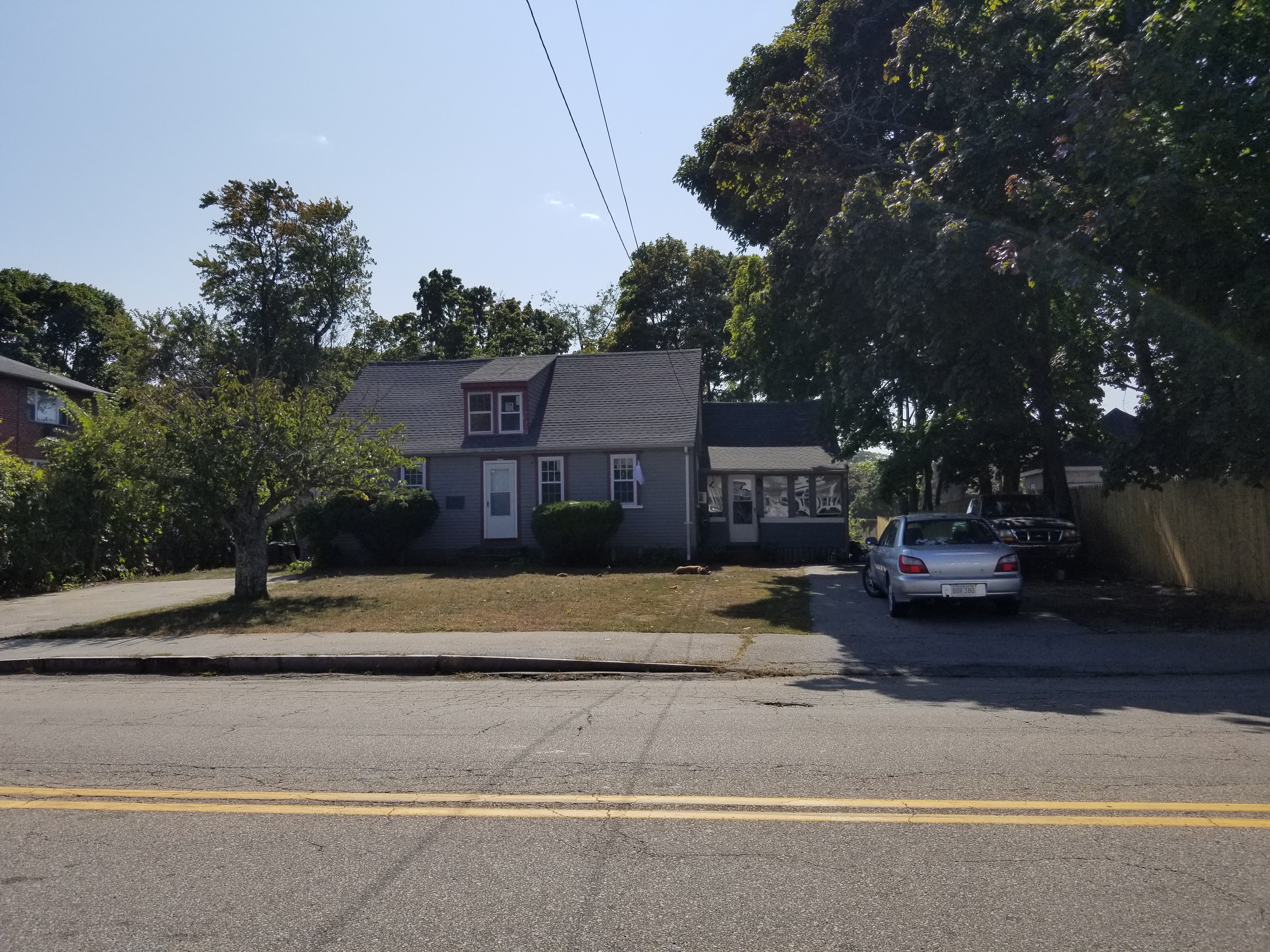
Bichman House, c. 1650, is likely the oldest surviving house in Weymouth.

By winter, poor planning and bad management led to supplies running out, and the Plymouth colonists had little to share. The situation grew desperate and Wessagusset men began to sell their clothes, hire themselves out as laborers, and stole from the local Massachusett Indians. The Indians were soon taunting the men and robbing them of what little food they gathered clamming and foraging in the woods. By now, many in the colony were starving or ill, and law and order had broken down. The lowest point came when a settler was accused of stealing supplies from the Massachusett, and the Massachusett leaders demanded the thief's execution; the Wessagusset men complied, but legend has it that they may have executed a dying, sick settler instead.

By April 1623, word came of conflict between American Indians and the Virginia colonists, and tension increased between the colonists at Wessagusset and the Indians. Massachusetts and other tribes began plotting to attack and destroy what was left of the floundering colony and the more successful Plymouth Colony. Wampanoag Chief Massasoit heard about the plot but soon fell ill and nearly died. A party from the Plymouth Colony came to his village and nursed him back to health, and he warned them of the plot. Governor William Bradford decided to preempt the planned attack, and sent Myles Standish to Wessagusset with the Plymouth militia and their Indian guide Hobbamock to end the threat. Using the promise of a meal of pork, Standish lured five of the more bellicose Massachusett Indians inside the stockade, including Wituwamat, a large man who had belittled Standish because he was short and had bragged about murdering a number of French shipwreck survivors. Once inside, there was a brief struggle and the Indian leaders were killed.

Ten of the original 60 colonists starved to death and two others were killed in conflicts with the Indians. Forty-five colonists joined Plymouth or went north to Maine, and from there most returned to England. Three men who had left the colony to live among the Indians as laborers could not be warned in time and were subsequently killed by them after Standish had released the women and children.

=== Weymouth colony ===
Robert Gorges attempted to form a colony at the site later that year as the center of a more royalist and Anglican system of government for New England. He brought William Morrell as religious leader and expected Governor Bradford to acknowledge his supremacy and act as his agent. Within weeks, the New England winter caused Gorges to leave with most of the settlers. Those who remained formed the nucleus of the permanent settlement. and the oldest in what would become Massachusetts Bay Colony. In 1630, it was officially incorporated into the Massachusetts Bay Colony; the name was changed to Weymouth in 1635. This is most likely due to the recent influx of colonists from Weymouth, Dorset. However, it could have also been named for English explorer George Weymouth, who had relations with Robert Gorges' father. These groups experienced some difficulty integrating together, especially due to conflicting pressures from the Puritans of Boston and the Pilgrims of Plymouth, but Weymouth was a stable and prominent town with its current boundaries by 1635. It was included as part of Suffolk County when it was formed on May 10, 1643. The oldest surviving house in Weymouth is the Bickman House (c. 1650) located at 84 Sea Street.

=== Post-colonization ===
Weymouth was heavily involved in the shoemaking industry from the first years of the 18th century right through to 1973, when the Stetson Shoe Company closed its doors. The building is currently being used for medical offices. The town is also the location of the former South Weymouth Naval Air Station, which was decommissioned in 1997 and is undergoing redevelopment into a mixed-use community known as Union Point.

The original town hall was destroyed by fire in 1914 and was replaced in 1928 with a town hall that is a replica of the old Massachusetts State House in Boston. Weymouth High School, located in South Weymouth, is one of the largest public high schools in the state, with over 1,800 enrolled students. The town is geographically divided into four village centers: North Weymouth, East Weymouth, South Weymouth, and Weymouth Landing. In May 2018, Massachusetts Governor Charlie Baker designated a tract of land near Lakeview Manor and the eastern and northern borders of Whitman's Pond as an "opportunity zone" under the Congressional Tax Cuts and Jobs Act of 2017.

== Points of interest ==
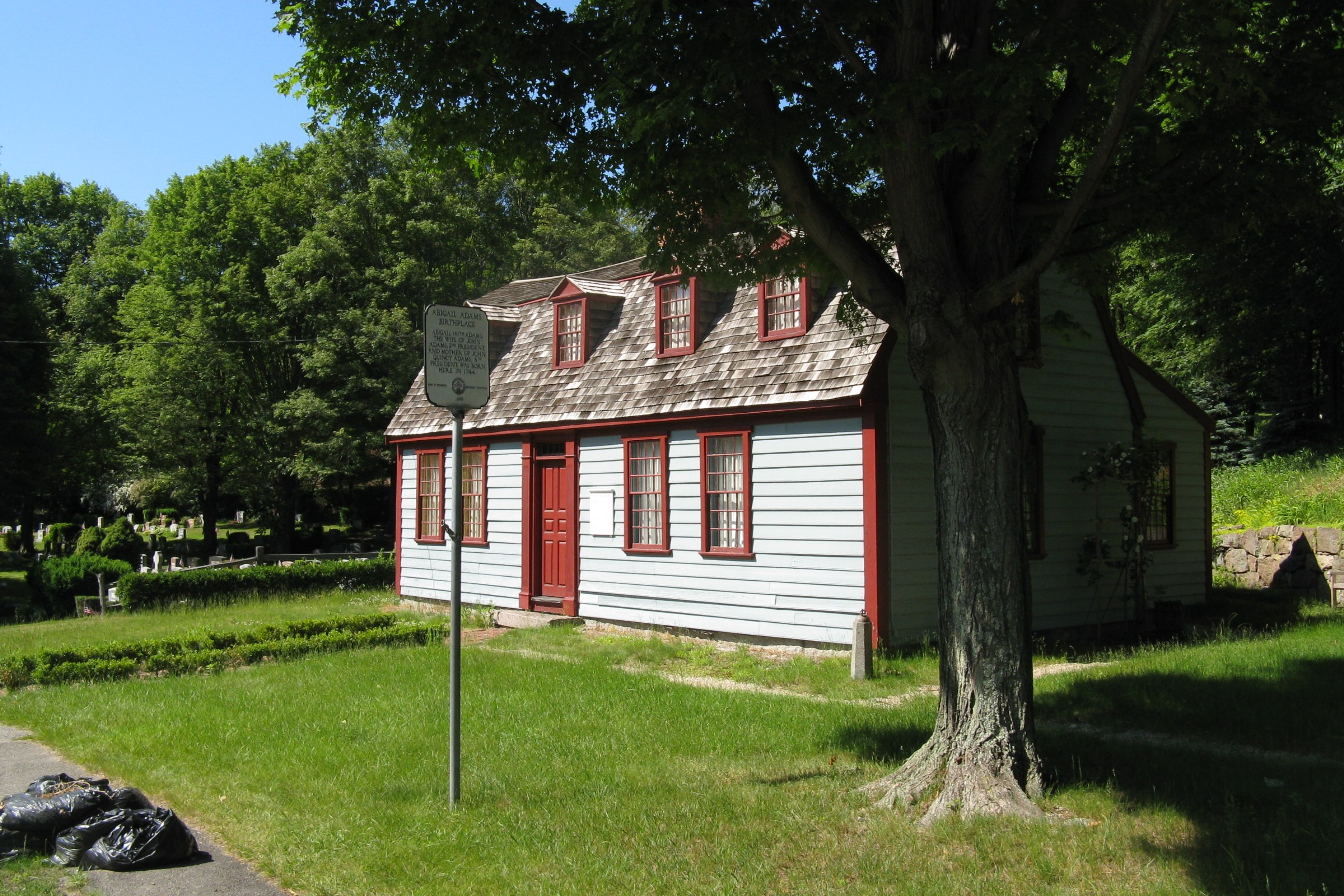
Abigail Adams birthplace

- The house where Abigail Adams, wife of President John Adams and mother to President John Quincy Adams, was born is in Weymouth.
- A portion of the former South Weymouth Naval Air Station, which was closed in 1996 under the Base Realignment and Closure Act, was located in Weymouth. The property has been slated for development, which will be called Union Point. Plans include a parkway, residences, a sports facility, and a movie studio. Films such as Don't Look Up, Free Guy, Patriots Day, Madame Web and Ghostbusters (2016 film) were shot in part at the latter.
- Union Point Sports Complex, a 25-acre (10 ha) sports complex.

=== Parks ===
Weymouth has 700 acres of parks and conservation land spread over 46 playgrounds, nature preserves, conservation land, memorials and recreation areas.

== Notable people ==
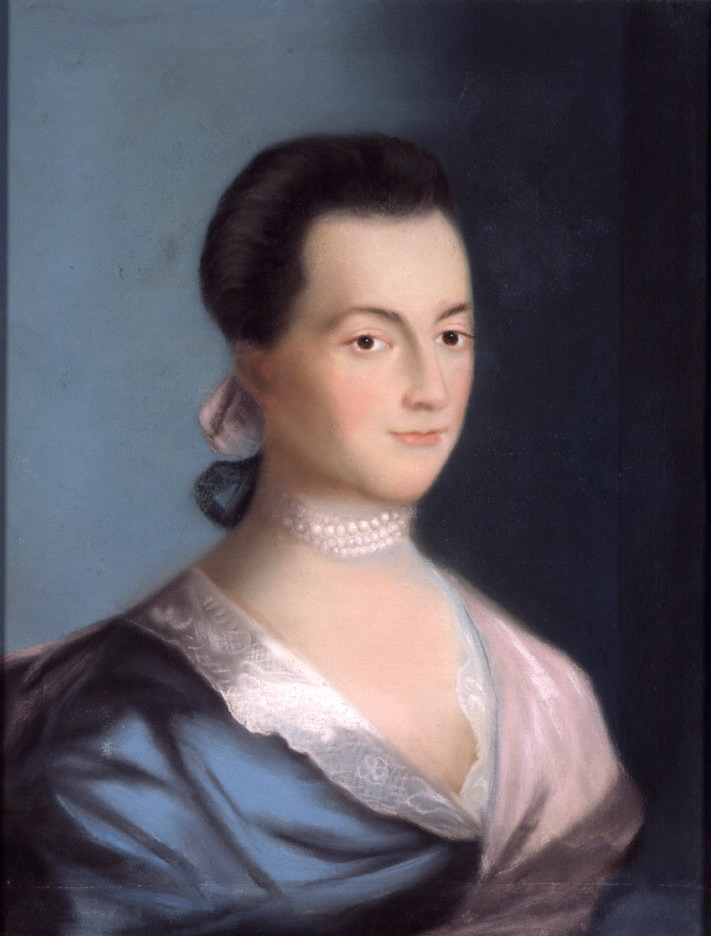
Abigail Adams

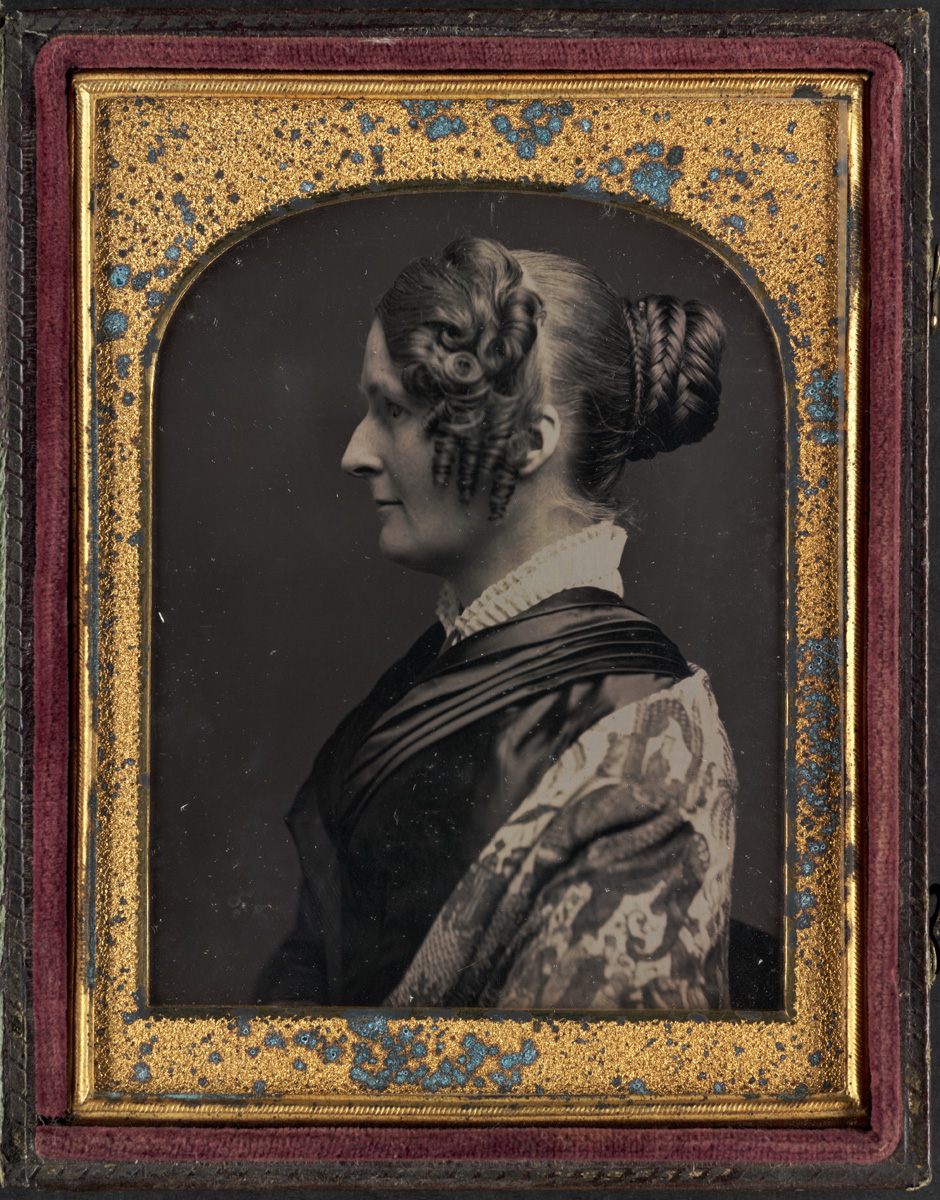
Maria Weston Chapman

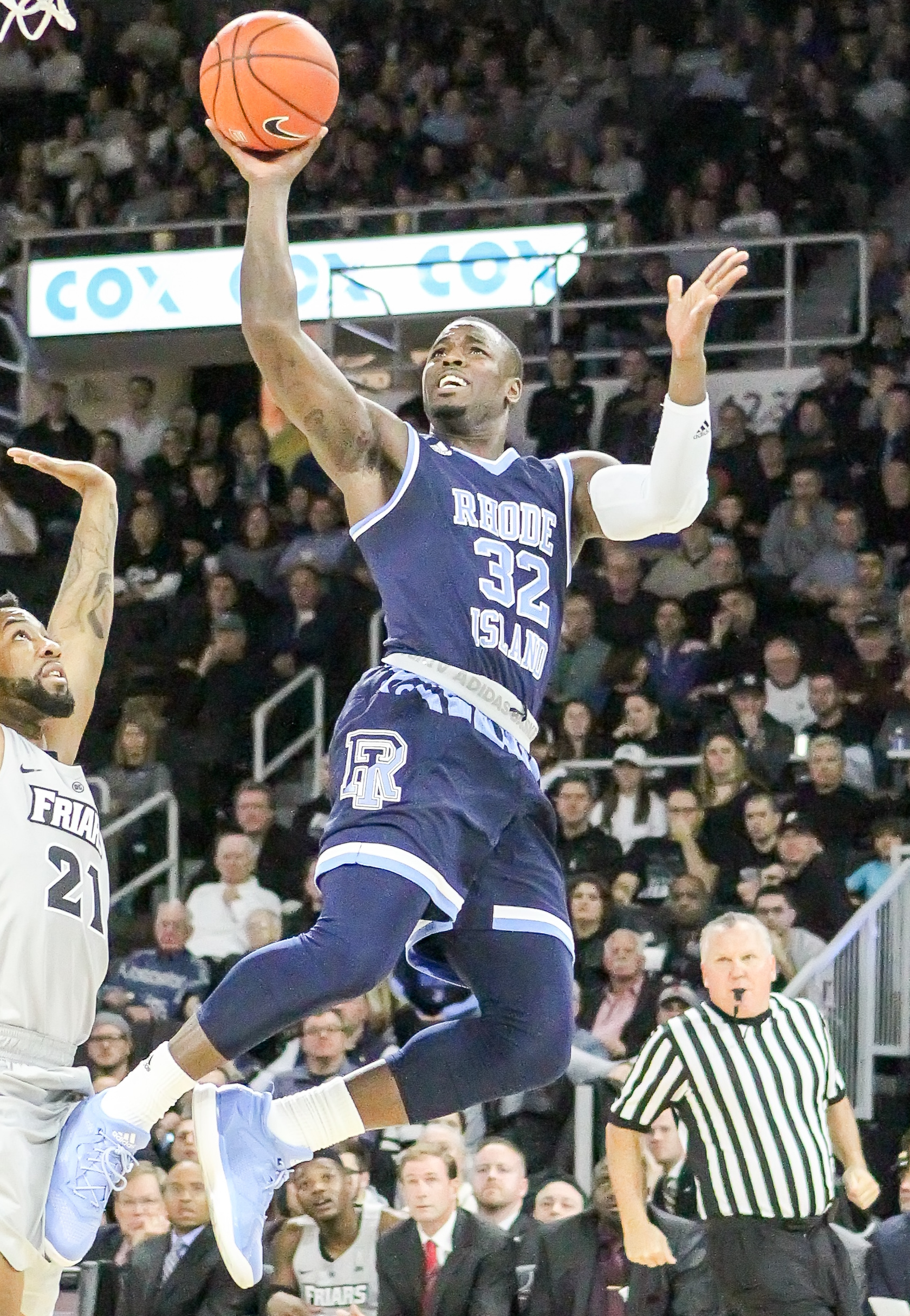
Jared Terrell

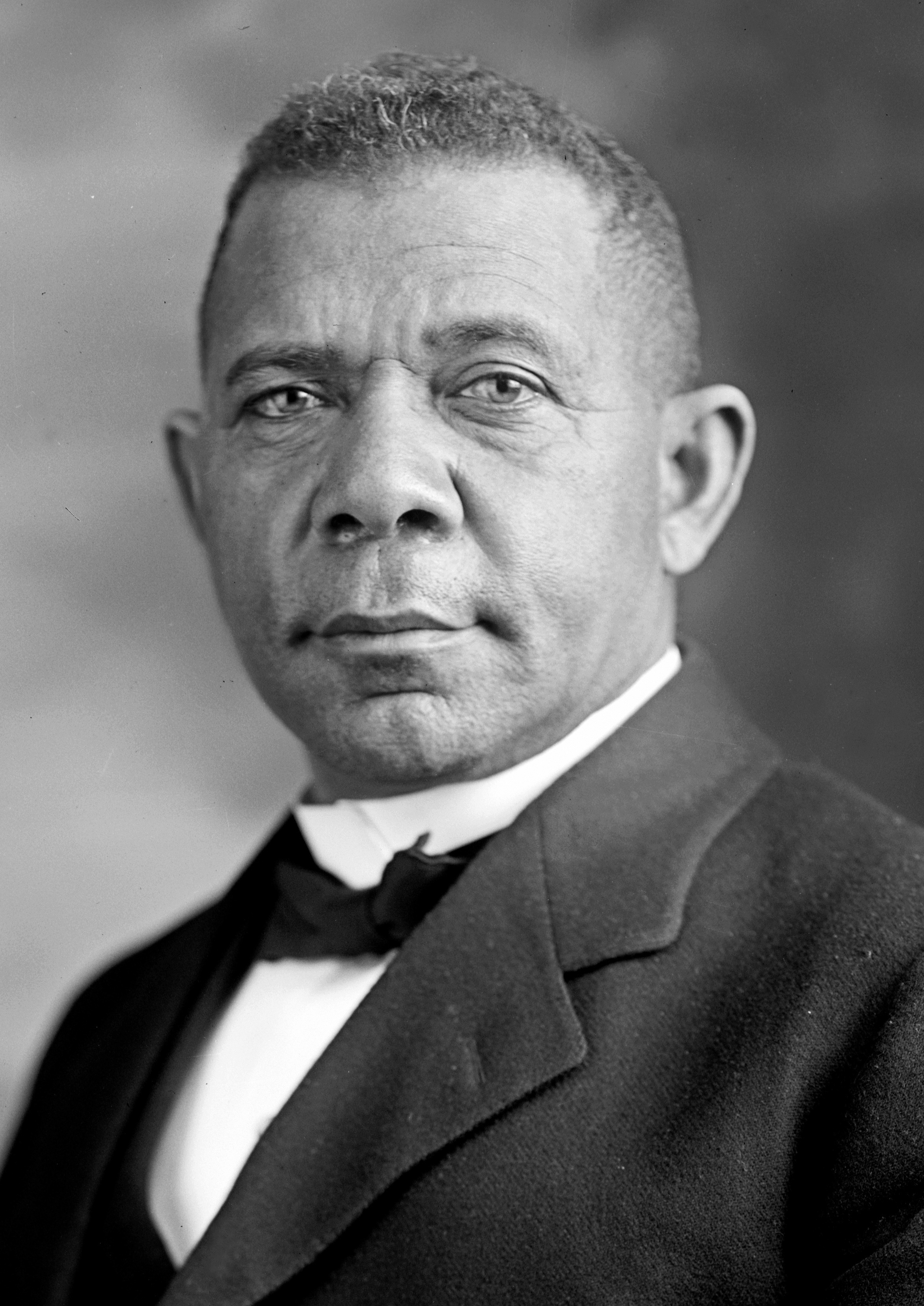
Booker T. Washington

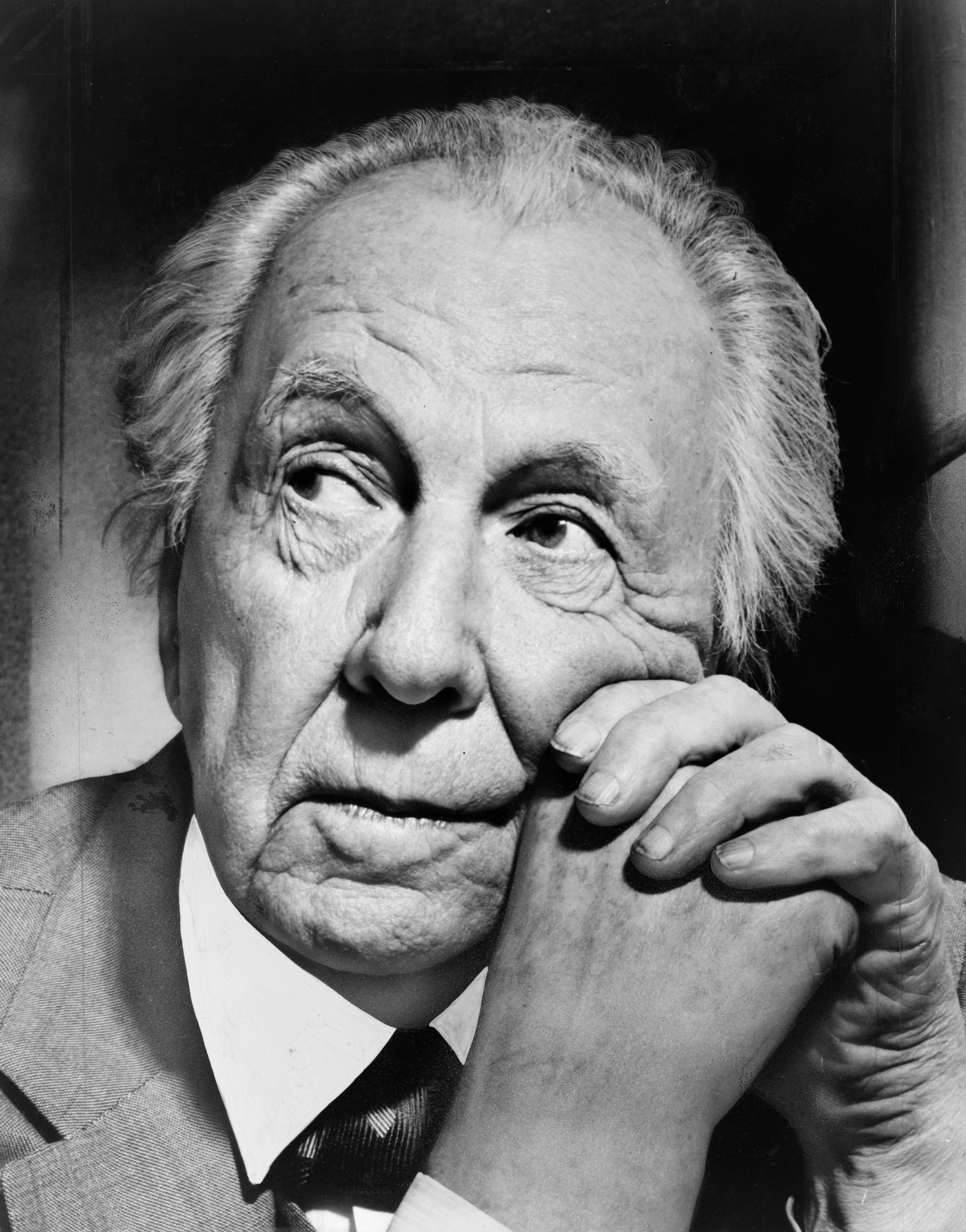
Frank Lloyd Wright

- Abigail Adams, wife of President John Adams
- Chris Bagley, soccer player
- James L. Bates, colonel in the Union Army during the American Civil War
- Tobin Bell, actor, most known for his role as Jigsaw in the movie Saw
- Rodney Butcher, professional golfer
- Scott Caldwell (born 1991), professional soccer player
- Jim Carey, NHL goaltender from 1994 to 1999, 1996 Vezina Trophy winner
- Paul Carey, ice hockey coach for Boston College and former player
- Marcy Carsey, television writer/producer
- Maria Weston Chapman, abolitionist, executive committee member of the American Anti-Slavery Society in 1839, organizer of the Boston Female Anti-Slavery Society, and editor of The Liberator and The Liberty Bell
- Michael J. Connor, Vice Admiral in the United States Navy, Commander, US Submarine Forces (COMNAVSUBFOR) 2012–2015
- Rob and Nate Corddry, correspondents for The Daily Show
- Charlie Coyle, professional hockey player for the Minnesota Wild (2012–2019), Boston Bruins (2019–2025), Colorado Avalanche (2025-2025) and Columbus Blue Jackets (2025-present)
- William Cranch, judge and the second reporter of decisions of the US Supreme Court
- Brittany Curran (born 1990), actress, most known for her role as Lucy Tranelli in the television show Men of a Certain Age
- William P. Doyle, commissioner of the Federal Maritime Commission
- Beatrice Farnham, 20th-century artist and entrepreneur
- Flip Gordon (Travis Gordon Lopes Jr.), professional wrestler
- Mike Hazen, Major League Baseball executive, Arizona Diamondbacks vice president
- Hal Holbrook, Academy Award-nominated actor
- Mark Holden, professional hockey goaltender for the Montreal Canadiens and Winnipeg Jets
- Newland H. Holmes, politician who served as President of the Massachusetts Senate from 1957 to 1958
- Dan Howley, Major League Baseball manager with the St. Louis Browns and the Cincinnati Reds
- Paul K. Hurley, 24th Chief of Chaplains of the United States Army
- Elden H. Johnson, US Army soldier and a recipient of the US military's highest decoration—the Medal of Honor—for his actions in World War II
- George Jung, a.k.a. "Boston George", subject of the 2001 film Blow, member of the Medellín Drug Cartel
- Tim Karalexis, professional soccer player
- Margaret D. Klein, Rear Admiral, in the United States Navy, Commander, US Expeditionary Strike Group Five (ESG-5), 82nd Commandant of Midshipmen at the United States Naval Academy (first woman to serve as commandant)
- Gilbert N. Lewis, physical chemist
- Dave Lindstrom, former professional football player for Kansas City Chiefs
- George Little, US Naval Officer, two destroyers have been named USS Little in his honor
- Charles G. Long, second Assistant Commandant of the Marine Corps, recipient of the Marine Corps Brevet Medal
- John J. Loud (1844–1916), inventor of the ballpoint pen
- Elias Mann, composer
- Allan R. McKinnon, former politician who served as a member of the Massachusetts State Senate from 1970 to 1984, Deputy Secretary of Transportation from 1985 to 1988, and Chairman of the Massachusetts Turnpike Authority from 1988 to 1996
- Patrick V. McNamara, Democratic Senator (1955–1966) from Michigan
- Kristie Mewis, soccer player for NJ/NY Gotham FC and the United States national team
- Joe Mulligan, Major League Baseball pitcher who played briefly for the Boston Red Sox during the 1934 season
- Bob Neumeier, sportscaster for NBC Sports
- James Peckham, 1956 was a participant for the US Olympic Greco Roman Wrestling team; Head Coach Greco Roman Olympic Wrestling team 1976
- Warren G. Phillips, inducted into the National Teachers Hall of Fame in 2010
- Richard Robbins, Academy Award-nominated film score composer
- Abby Rosmarin, model and writer
- Frank Salemme, mobster
- Gary Lee Sampson, spree killer
- Bobby Sheehan, former professional hockey player from 1969 to 1983
- Mark Shields, political pundit and liberal commentator
- Ralph Talbot, first US Marine Corps aviator awarded the Medal of Honor for "exceptionally meritorious service and extraordinary heroism" while attached to Squadron C, US 1st Marine Aviation Force, in France during World War I
- Jared Terrell (born 1995), basketball player in the Israeli Basketball Premier League, played at URI
- Albert Tirrell, first person acquitted of murder in the US using the sleepwalking defense
- Kurt Walker, NHL player
- Booker T. Washington, African-American educator, author, and civic leader, owned a vacation home at 825 Main Street, 1902–1903
- Ray White, football player
- Frank Lloyd Wright, architect, lived in Weymouth briefly as a child when his father was a minister at the Weymouth Unitarian Universalist Church
- David Wyman, author of several books on the responses of the US to Nazi Germany's persecution of and programs to exterminate Jews
- Paul Zukauskas, professional football player, Cleveland Browns

== See also ==
- Mayor-council government
