= Battleship Massachusetts =

Battleship Massachusetts can refer to:

- USS Massachusetts (BB-2) (1896-1919), now an underwater preserve
- USS Massachusetts (BB-59), a World War II battleship now a museum ship.

== See also ==
- USS Massachusetts
