= USS Massachusetts =

Eight ships of the United States Navy and Revenue-Marine have been named USS Massachusetts, after the Commonwealth of Massachusetts: (Note: At the time of the commissioning of SSN-798, it was alternately reported as the fifth Navy vessel named after the Commonwealth, the first having been the 1845 steamer.)

1. USRC Massachusetts (1791), a topsail schooner and the first Revenue-Marine cutter of the United States, sold in 1792
2. USRC Massachusetts II (1793), a sloop built to replace the 1791 Massachusetts
3. USS Massachusetts (1845), a wooden steamer that saw action during the Mexican–American War and in Puget Sound
4. USS Massachusetts (1860), an iron screw steamer that saw action during the American Civil War
5. USS Massachusetts (BB-2), an Indiana-class battleship commissioned in 1896 as the second battleship procured by the U.S. Navy; saw action in the Spanish–American War, scuttled in 1921
6. USS Massachusetts (1917), originally a privately-owned fast cargo vessel, purchased and commissioned by the U.S. Navy in late 1917 and converted to a minelayer; renamed Shawmut in early 1918, renamed Oglala in 1928
7. USS Massachusetts (BB-59), a battleship of the second South Dakota class, commissioned in 1942; saw action in World War II, now a museum ship
8. USS Massachusetts (SSN-798), a Virginia-class submarine launched in 2024 and commissioned in late March 2026

== See also ==
- USS Massachusetts (1869), the never-launched Kalamazoo-class monitor Passaconaway renamed first to Thunderer then to Massachusetts before being scrapped in 1884
- SS Massachusetts (1891), a steel-hulled freighter later renamed as the USAT Sheridan
- USS Massachusetts (BB-54), a planned battleship of the first South Dakota class, canceled by the Washington Naval Treaty in 1923
