= USS Williams (DD-108) =

Wickes-class destroyer

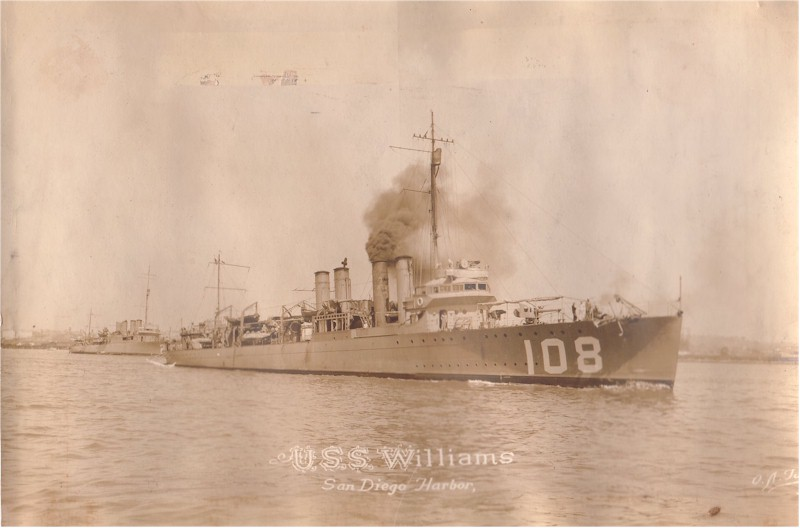
- USS Williams underway

History

United States
- Name: Williams
- Namesake: John Foster Williams
- Builder: Union Iron Works, San Francisco, California
- Laid down: 25 March 1918
- Launched: 4 July 1918
- Commissioned: 1 March 1919
- Decommissioned: 7 June 1922
- Commissioned: 6 November 1939
- Decommissioned: 24 September 1940
- Stricken: 8 January 1941
- Identification: DD-108
- Fate: Transferred to Canada, 24 September 1940

Canada
- Name: St. Clair
- Namesake: St. Clair River
- Commissioned: 24 September 1940
- Identification: Pennant number: I65
- Honours and awards: Atlantic 1943–44
- Fate: Scrapped, 1946

General characteristics
- Class & type: Wickes-class destroyer
- Displacement: 1,191 tons
- Length: 314 ft 5 in (95.8 m)
- Beam: 31 ft 9 in (9.7 m)
- Draft: 9 ft 2 in (2.8 m)
- Speed: 35 knots (65 km/h)
- Complement: 122 officers and enlisted
- Armament: 4 × 4 in (102 mm) guns; 12 × 21 in (533 mm) torpedo tubes

USS Williams (DD-108) was a Wickes-class destroyer in the United States Navy entering service in 1919, and was the second ship to bear the name. Following a brief stint in active service, the ship was laid up for 17 years before being reactivated during World War II. Williams transferred to the Royal Canadian Navy during World War II as part of Lend-Lease and was renamed HMCS St. Clair (I65), surviving the war and being scrapped in 1946.

== Construction and career ==
=== United States Navy ===
Named in honor of John Foster Williams, the destroyer was laid down on 25 March 1918 at San Francisco, California, by the Union Iron Works plant of the Bethlehem Shipbuilding Corporation. Williams was launched on 4 July 1918, sponsored by Mrs. H. G. Leopold, the wife of Commander H. G. Leopold. The destroyer commissioned on 1 March 1919 at the Mare Island Navy Yard, Vallejo, California.

Following shakedown trials, Williams and the destroyer Belknap departed Newport, Rhode Island, on 5 June 1919, bound for the Azores. Arriving at Ponta Delgada on 11 June, Williams proceeded to Gibraltar, where she picked up information pertaining to minefields still in operation in the Adriatic Sea, for delivery to the Commander, Naval Forces, Eastern Mediterranean. The destroyer visited Split, Kingdom of Serbs, Croats and Slovenes; Gallipoli, in the Dardanelles; and Trieste, Italy, where she operated as part of the US naval forces monitoring the local situation there.

After returning to the United States arriving at New York City on 1 August 1919, Williams was assigned to the Pacific Fleet. Given the hull number DD-108 on 17 July 1920, the destroyer operated out of San Diego, California until decommissioned there on 7 June 1922 and placed in reserve.

The German invasion of Poland on 1 September 1939 began hostilities in Europe, and President Franklin D. Roosevelt immediately declared the United States' neutrality. To augment the fleet units already engaged in the Neutrality Patrol hurriedly placed off the eastern seaboard and gulf coast of the United States, the navy recommissioned 77 destroyers and light minelayers.

Williams was among those recommissioned at San Diego on 6 November 1939. Following a refit at Mare Island, the destroyer operated in the San Diego area until sailing for Panama on 5 February. Transiting the Panama Canal on 16 February, she lay at Balboa, Panama, for a brief time. During her stay there, the destroyer "manned the rail" in honor of President Roosevelt, who was then engaged in an informal inspection of the Canal Zone's defenses. Underway soon thereafter, Williams arrived at the Naval Operating Base (NOB), Key West, Florida, on 27 February.

In the following months, Williams operated with the Atlantic Squadron of the fleet, conducting neutrality patrols as well as training cruises consisting of short-range battle practices and ship-handling drills in March, she conducted an astronomical survey in the Bahamas. On 9 April, Williams transported a survey party to Palmetto Island in the British West Indies before shifting to Guantánamo Bay, Cuba. After moving back to Key West for a time, Williams departed Florida's waters on 2 June and arrived at New York on 4 June. She conducted two training cruises for embarked Naval Reserve contingents, which kept her busy into mid-1940. After a final refit at the Boston Navy Yard, she departed Charlestown, Massachusetts, on 18 September, bound for Canadian waters; and reached Halifax, Nova Scotia, two days later.

As one of the 50 destroyers transferred to the British under lend-lease in return for leases on important base sites in the Western Hemisphere— Williams was selected as one of the six units slated for the Royal Canadian Navy. Soon after her arrival at Halifax on 20 September 1940, she got underway for a brief familiarization cruise for the Canadian crewmen. Williams was decommissioned and turned over to the Canadian government on 24 September; her name was subsequently struck from the Navy list on 8 January 1941.

=== Royal Canadian Navy ===
Renamed HMCS St. Clair with the pennant number I65—following the Canadian practice of naming destroyers after Canadian rivers (but with deference to the U.S. origin), her name commemorates the St. Clair River which forms the boundary between Michigan and Ontario—the destroyer was fitted out for convoy escort duties and sailed for the British Isles on 30 November, in company with HMCS St. Croix (ex-McCook) and HMCS Niagara (ex-Thatcher).

Operating with the Clyde Escort force, St. Clair escorted convoys in and out of the heavily travelled Western Approaches to the British Isles in the spring of 1941. Late in May, when the powerful German battleship Bismarck and the heavy cruiser Prinz Eugen slipped through the Denmark Straits, the "flush decker" became involved in the intensive and widespread effort to destroy the German dreadnought. Eventually, a British force located and sank Bismarck on 27 May, but not before the tragic loss of the battlecruiser HMS Hood on 24 May. The search for the elusive German force brought some of the British units dangerously close to exhaustion of their fuel supplies. Two Tribal-class destroyers, HMS Mashona and HMS Tartar, were located by German long-range bombers soon after Bismarck had slipped beneath the waves and were sunk. St. Clair, near the battle area, became involved in the action when she, too, came under attack. The old destroyer doggedly put up a good defense—shooting down one, and possibly, a second, enemy plane.

St. Clair subsequently joined the Newfoundland Escort Force after this group's establishment in June 1941 and operated on convoy escort missions between Newfoundland and Reykjavík, Iceland, through the end of 1941. St. Clair was assigned to the Western Local Escort Force following repairs at Saint John, New Brunswick, in early 1942, and operated out of Halifax over the next two years, escorting coastwise convoys until withdrawn from this service in 1943 due to her deteriorating condition.

Operating as a submarine depot ship at Halifax until deemed unfit for further duty "in any capacity" in August 1944, St. Clair was used as a fire-fighting and damage control hulk until 1946. Handed over to the War Assets Corporation for disposal, on 6 October 1946, St. Clair was subsequently broken up for scrap.
