= Abby Rosmarin =

American model and writer

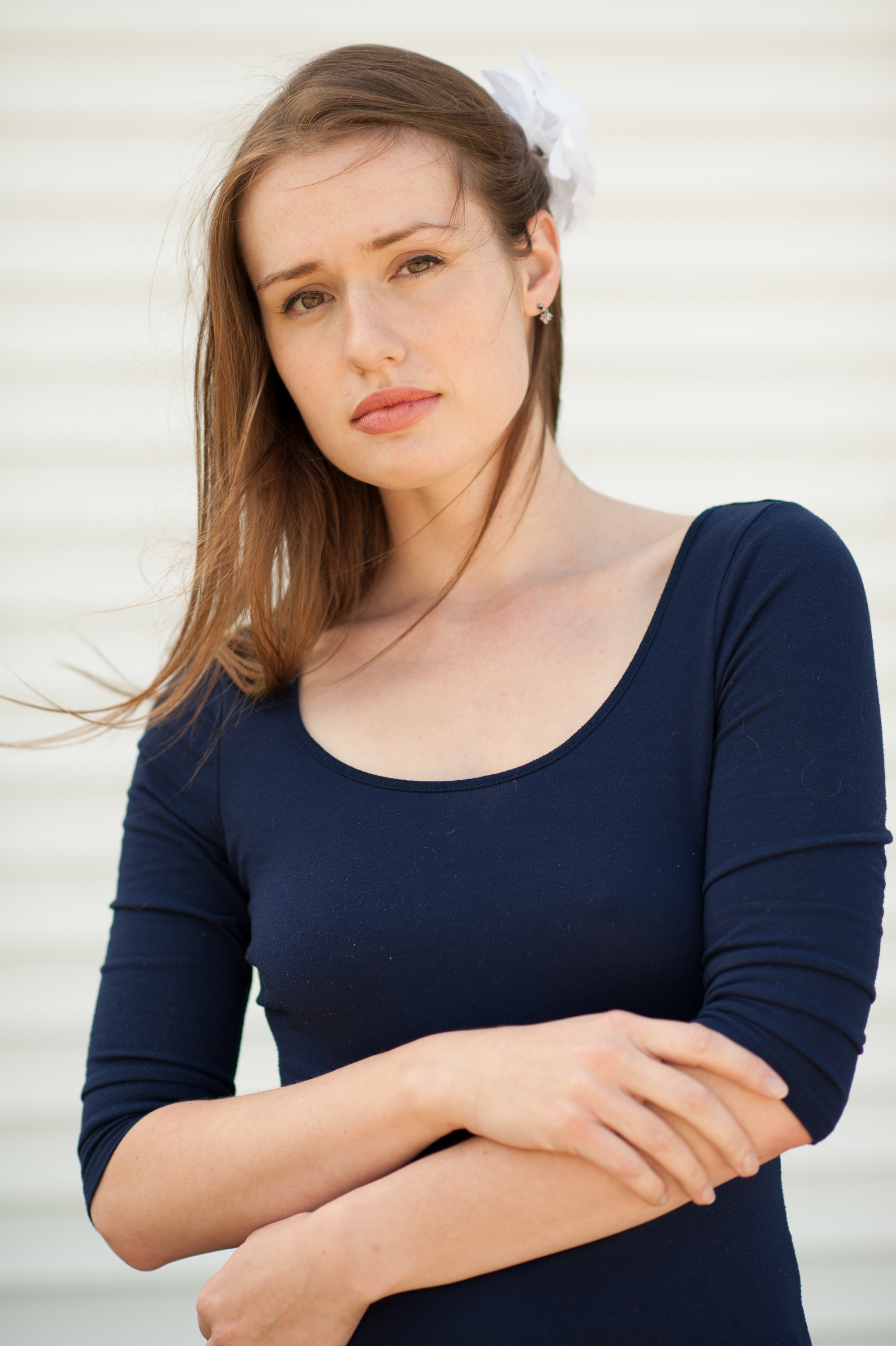
- Born: Abigail Hawkins; September 17, 1986 (age 40); Boston, Massachusetts
- Writing career
- Subjects: Fiction, Nonfiction, Memoir, Humor
- Website: That Abby Rose

Abby Rosmarin is a model and writer. She is the author of Amazon bestselling The Ballerina's Guide to Boxing, as well as The Secret to a Happy Marriage, In the Event the Flower Girl Explodes, Chick Lit (And Other Formulas for Life), I'm Just Here for the Free Scrutiny, and No One Reads Poetry: A Collection of Poems. She is also known for the viral essay "To The Women Who Choose Not to Have Children". Her work has appeared in The Huffington Post, xoJane, MindBodyGreen, Elite Daily, HelloGiggles, Thought Catalog, Elephant Journal, Bustle, and others.

== Personal life ==
Abby Rosmarin (born Abigail Hawkins) was born in Boston, Massachusetts and grew up in Weymouth, Massachusetts. She graduated summa cum laude from Northeastern University with a degree in English. Abby spent four years as a preschool teacher before leaving the education field, citing the emotional and mental strain of classroom management. She then became a registered yoga teacher and refocused her efforts on writing and modeling.

Abby Rosmarin currently lives in New Hampshire, where she is a candidate for a Master of Science in Clinical Mental Health Counseling.

== Career ==
=== Writing ===
Abby Rosmarin began her writing career writing for Kiwibox Magazine in the early 2000s. Her work would then appear in the literary magazine Spectrum in 2006. In 2013, Abby began writing for Thought Catalog, where she wrote on the topics of human behavior, gender roles, mental well-being, fitness, and the strains of the teaching world. In 2014, she also became a contributing writer at HelloGiggles and EliteDaily. In 2015, she joined the blogging team at The Huffington Post, where she would continue her commentary on social and emotional issues.

Her essay, "To the Women Who Choose Not to Have Kids" garnered a considerable amount of attention and was discussed on websites such as Clutch Magazine, AfterHours Radio, and Life Without Baby. Many praised her vocal appreciation of women who actively decided to remain child-free. Others criticized Rosmarin for her potential "condescension" toward women without children. Rosmarin penned other viral essays, including "A To Do List For Myself After My Father's Death" which would be later translated into Spanish on Huffington Post.

On April 7, 2014, I'm Just Here for the Free Scrutiny, a collection of essays on the modeling world, was published by Thought Catalog. On January 11, 2015, I'm Just Here for the Free Scrutiny was released as an audiobook on Audible.

On September 16, 2015, Chick Lit (And Other Formulas for Life), Rosmarin's first fiction novel, was released in paperback and ebook form. After years of attempting to publish her book through traditional venues, Rosmarin opted to independently publish her book on platforms like Amazon, Barnes & Noble, and iTunes, an endeavor she would later write about for HelloGiggles and Huffington Post. Just two weeks after her book was released, Rosmarin's father died, an experience documented in her Huffington Post essay, "Writer Interrupted: On Losing My Father Immediately After Publishing My Book".

On May 20, 2016, No One Reads Poetry: A Collection of Poetry was published through Thought Catalog, cracking the list of Top 100 female poets on Amazon at #70.

Rosmarin's essay "Why We Owe To Ourselves As Women And Survivors To Keep The Brock Turner Conversation Going" was included in the anthology More Than 20 Minutes of Reading: Everything You Need To Read About The Brock Turner Case And Controversy, published through Thought Catalog on June 10, 2016. On June 30, 2016, Rosmarin's essay "How to Find Yourself When You're Completely Lost" (originally "This Is How You Find Yourself") was selected to be a part of Let's Get Lost, a collection of essays about wanderlust.

Some of Rosmarin's most popular essays focus on introversion, particularly a brand of introversion she calls "social introversion". Her essay "15 Struggles of the Social Introvert" was included in the anthology How to Be An Introvert on August 29, 2016.

In February 2018, Rosmarin released her second fiction book, In the Event the Flower Girl Explodes, to positive reviews from both critics and readers. The book was a Kindle Scout contender and is available in paperback, ebook, and audiobook.

In May 2020, Rosmarin released her first short story collection, The Secret to a Happy Marriage, which debuted at #6 on Amazon. The collection featured stories from STORGY Magazine, The Bangalore Review, Chaleur Magazine, and others.

In March 2021, Rosmarin released her first young adult novel, The Ballerina's Guide to Boxing, which was a #1 New Release on Amazon.

In March 2023, Rosmarin signed with Gardner Literary Agency.

=== Podcasting ===
From 2018 to 2021, Rosmarin teamed up with fellow model Ashley Barajas to form Cheers to Adulting. The podcast focused on life hacks and general discussions about being an adult. The podcast was well-regarded and received praise for the co-hosts' banter and cohost dynamics. As of 2022, Rosmarin and Barajas announced that Cheers to Adulting had been discontinued, citing changes in life circumstances and busy schedules.

=== Modeling ===
Abby Rosmarin modeled under her maiden name and has been previously signed to Model Club, Inc, and Maggie, Inc, of Boston. She has worked on campaigns for Harley Davidson, Volvo, Target, Babies R Us, Lady Grace, Sportrak, and others.

== Bibliography ==
=== Novels ===
- The Ballerina's Guide to Boxing, (2021)
- In the Event the Flower Girl Explodes, (2018)
- Chick Lit & Other Formulas for Life, (2015)

=== Collections ===
- The Secret to a Happy Marriage, short stories (2020)
- No One Reads Poetry: A Collection of Poems, poetry (2016)
- I'm Just Here for the Free Scrutiny, essays (2014)
