= Massachusetts ship Tyrannicide (1776) =

History

Massachusetts
- Namesake: "Tyrant killer"
- Builder: Salisbury, Massachusetts shipyard
- Launched: July 1776
- Homeport: Salem, Massachusetts
- Fate: Scuttled 14 August 1779

General characteristics
- Sail plan: brigantine
- Complement: 75 men
- Armament: 14 × 6 or 4-pounder guns

Tyrannicide was a 14-gun brigantine of the Massachusetts State Navy. The ship was built during the American Revolutionary War and participated in commerce raiding until being destroyed in the Penobscot Expedition.

== John Fisk ==
Captain John Fisk (born in Salem 10 April 1744) was the first commanding officer, Jonathan Haraden of Gloucester was First Lieutenant, and Joseph Stockman was 2nd Lieutenant. Tyrannicide sailed from the Salisbury, Massachusetts, shipyard on 8 July 1776 and returned to Salem, Massachusetts 17 July after capturing the sloop HMS Dispatch on 12 July following a 90-minute engagement at 41°26′N 65°50′W. Dispatch mounted 8 carriage guns and 12 swivel guns with a crew of 31 men. Dispatch lost her commander and two others killed, and five wounded. The armed ship Glasgow, the brig Saint John, and the schooner Three Brothers were captured during an August 1776 cruise between Cape Sable and Nantucket. Tyrannicide narrowly avoided capture by a British frigate which retook a fourth prize. Tyrannicide was re-rigged from schooner to brigantine prior to embarking on a cruise to the West Indies on 29 October 1776. Tyrannicide captured the snow Ann, the brig Henry and Ann, the 140-ton snow John, and the 100-ton brig Three Friends, before returning to Massachusetts on 14 February 1777.

== Jonathan Haraden ==
First Lieutenant Jonathan Haraden was promoted to command Tyrannicide when Captain Fisk assumed command of the brig Massachusetts. The two ships sailed together for the coast of Europe on 24 March 1777. They captured the brig Eagle, the snow Sally out of London with a cargo of English goods for Quebec, and then on 2 April Chalkley out of Honduras bound for Bristol with a cargo of mahogany at 41°30′N 45°00′W. On 8 April Tyrannicide captured the 500-ton barque Lonsdale after a three-hour engagement at 35° W. Massachusetts and Tyrannicide cooperated in the 22 April capture of a brig straggling from a British convoy at 48°N 16°W. Tyrannicide captured the 160-ton brig Trepassy on 30 April, but became separated from Massachusetts while being chased by a superior British squadron on 17 May. Tyrannicide escaped to Bilbao, Spain after throwing guns and stores overboard to lighten the ship, and returned to Boston on 30 August 1777.

Tyrannicide sailed with Hazard on 21 November 1777 and captured the 130 ton brig Alexander on 13 December. Alexander was out of Halifax with a cargo of fish, oil, lumber and staves bound for the West Indies. The prize was retaken by HMS Yarmouth on 22 January 1778 off Barbados. Tyrannicide captured the schooner Good Intent on 22 December and the brig Polly (both out of Newfoundland with cargoes of fish and hoops) and then the snow Swift with a cargo of flour out of Bristol. On 18 February, 1778 she was fired upon by HMS Deal Castle off St. Vincent but was able to escape. Tyrannicide left the West Indies on 30 March 1778 and returned to Boston in May.

== John Allen Hallet ==
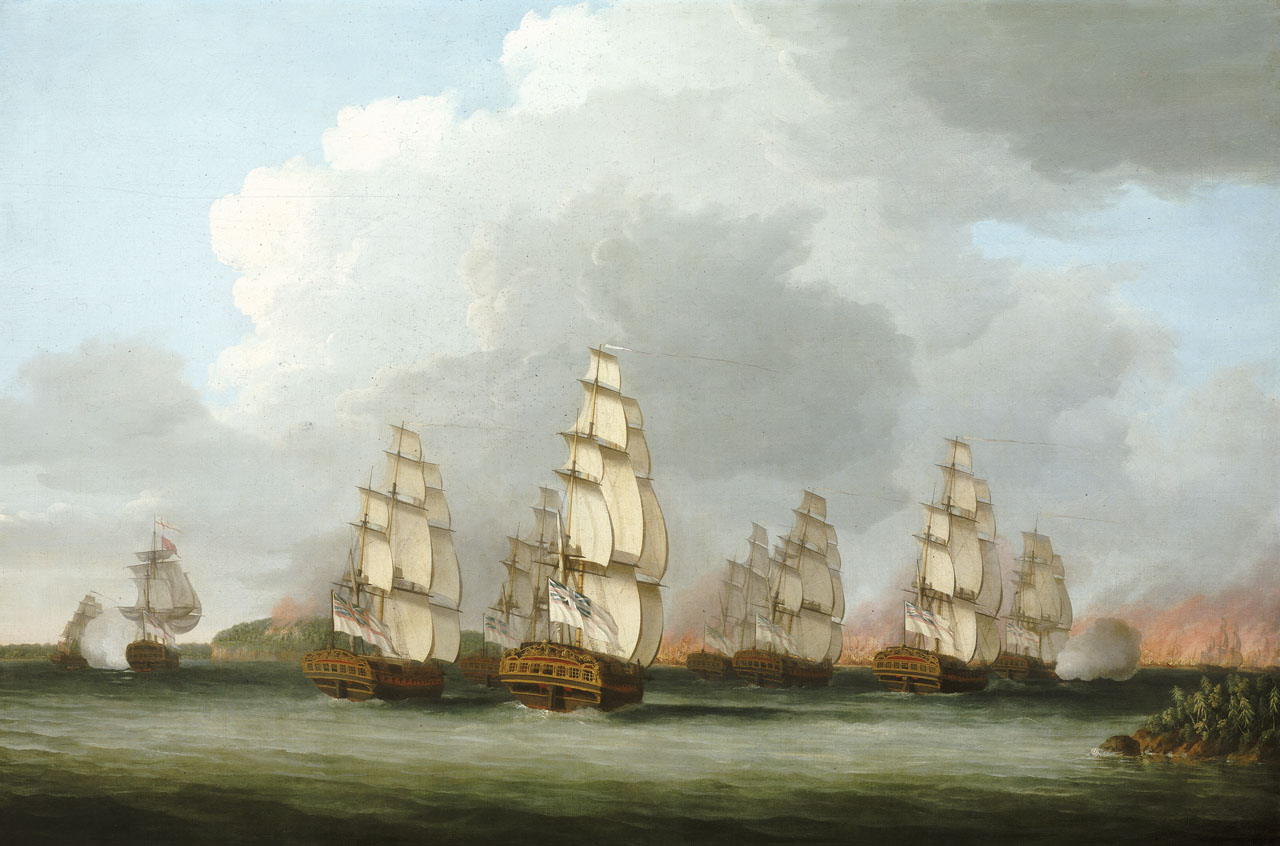
Destruction of the American Fleet at Penobscot Bay by Dominic Serres, depicting the Royal Navy chasing American ships up the Penobscot River

Tyrannicide next sailed on 10 July 1778 under the command of John Allen Hallet. On 29 September 1778 she captured the privateer brig Juno. After avoiding damage in a 9 March 1779 gale, she captured the 14-gun privateer Revenge on 31 March at 28° N, 68° W. Revenge mounted fourteen 4 and 6-pounder carriage guns and two swivel guns, and had a crew of 60. Tyrannicide captured two more prizes before returning to Boston on 25 April 1779.

== John Cathcart ==
John Cathcart assumed command of Tyrannicide on 1 May 1779. She was part of the Penobscot Expedition sailing from Boston on 24 July. With the other ships of the expedition, she was burned at Bangor, Maine, on 14 August 1779 after retreating up the Penobscot River to avoid capture by a superior British fleet.
