= Jonathan Haraden =

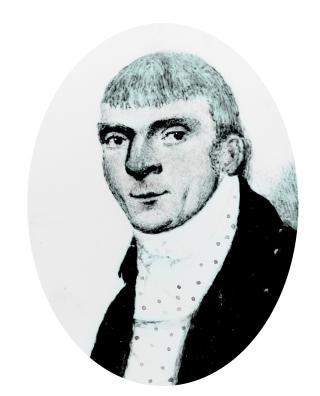
- Born: November 11, 1744; Gloucester, Massachusetts
- Died: November 23, 1803 (aged 59); Salem, Massachusetts
- Military career
- Allegiance: Province of Massachusetts Bay; United States
- Branch: Massachusetts State Navy
- Rank: Lieutenant
- Commands: Tyrannicide
- Engagements: American Revolutionary War

Lieutenant Jonathan Haradan (November 11, 1744 – November 23, 1803) was a Massachusetts State Navy officer and privateer who served in the American Revolutionary War.

== Life ==
Haraden was born on November 11, 1744 in Gloucester, Massachusetts. As a boy he worked in Salem, Massachusetts for the prominent merchant and future Senator George Cabot. He joined the Massachusetts State Navy in July 1776 as first lieutenant onboard the 14-gun sloop Tyrannicide. On board for two years, he participated in the capture of several prizes, becoming her commander in 1777. He had changes ships in 1778. The Tyrannicide went on to be scuttled during the Penobscot Expedition in 1779.

In 1778, Haraden left the Massachusetts navy to began his career as a privateer, commanding the General Pickering (a letter of marque ship of 180 tons, with 16 6-pounder guns, and a crew of 106). On October 13, 1779, he engaged three British privateers off New Jersey simultaneously. In April 1780, he captured the 22-gun privateer Golden Eagle in the Bay of Biscay. A larger British privateer, the 42-gun Achilles, attempted to recapture Golden Eagle a few days later, though Haraden forced her to disengage after a three-hour action at close quarters. In 1781, his ship was captured by a British fleet under Admiral George Rodney in Sint Eustatius, but Haraden managed to escape. Haraden commanded the privateer Julius Caesar in 1782.

After the American Revolutionary War ended in 1783, Haraden became a rope maker in Salem. As the years passed, his health deteriorated steadily when he caught Tuberculosis. He died in Salem on November 23, 1803. He was buried in Salem's Broad Street Cemetery.

=== Family ===
Haraden married three times: Hannah Deadman June 8, 1767 (by whom he had two sons and two daughters); Eunice Diman Mason, March 11, 1782; and Mary Scallam on Oct. 12, 1797 (by whom he had a daughter, Lucy, born when he was 67). Mary, only 45 at her husband's death, lived until 1832.

=== Legacy ===
- Two destroyers of the United States Navy have been named USS Haraden for him.
