= USS Massachusetts (SSN-798) =

US Navy Virginia-class submarine

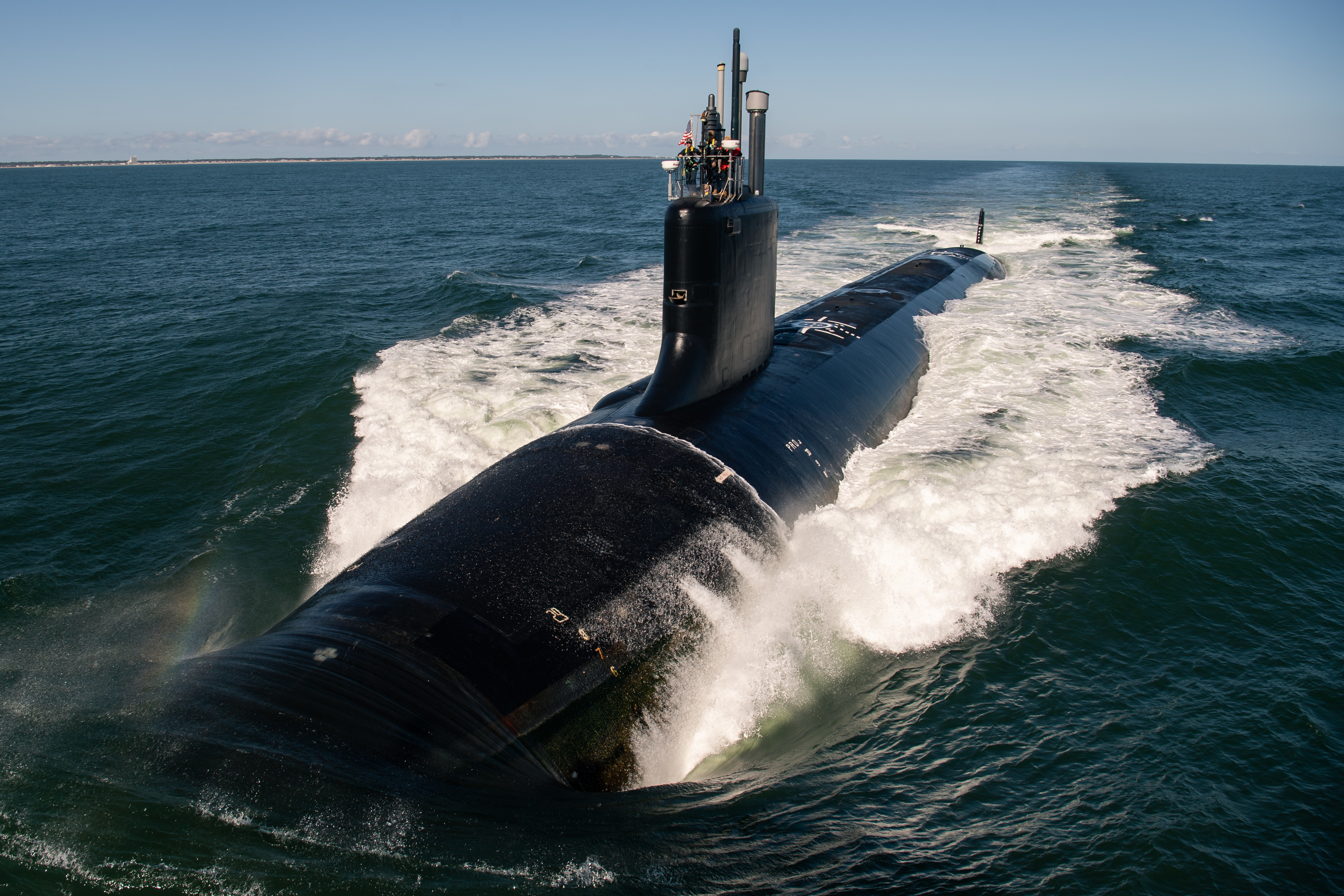
- Massachusetts in October 2025 during her sea trials

History

United States
- Name: Massachusetts
- Namesake: Commonwealth of Massachusetts
- Ordered: 28 April 2014
- Builder: Newport News Shipbuilding, Newport News, Virginia
- Laid down: 11 December 2020
- Launched: 23 February 2024
- Sponsored by: Sheryl Sandberg
- Christened: 6 May 2023
- Commissioned: 28 March 2026
- Identification: Hull symbol: SSN-798
- Motto: Pro Patria; ("For Country")
- Status: In active service

General characteristics
- Class & type: Virginia-class submarine
- Displacement: 7,800 tons
- Length: 377 ft (115 m)
- Beam: 34 ft (10.4 m)
- Draft: 32 ft (9.8 m)
- Propulsion: S9G reactor auxiliary diesel engine
- Speed: 25 knots (29 mph; 46 km/h)
- Endurance: can remain submerged for up to 3 months
- Test depth: greater than 800 ft (244 m)
- Complement: 15 officers; 120 enlisted
- Armament: 12 VLS tubes, four 21 inch (530 mm) torpedo tubes for Mk-48 torpedoes BGM-109 Tomahawk

USS Massachusetts (SSN-798) is a Virginia-class nuclear powered attack submarine commissioned into the United States Navy on 28 March 2026. She is the 25th submarine of the class, and is named for the U.S. state of Massachusetts—the eighth such vessel. (Note: At the time of the commissioning of SSN-798, it was alternately reported as the fifth Navy vessel named after the Commonwealth, the first having been an 1845 steamer.)

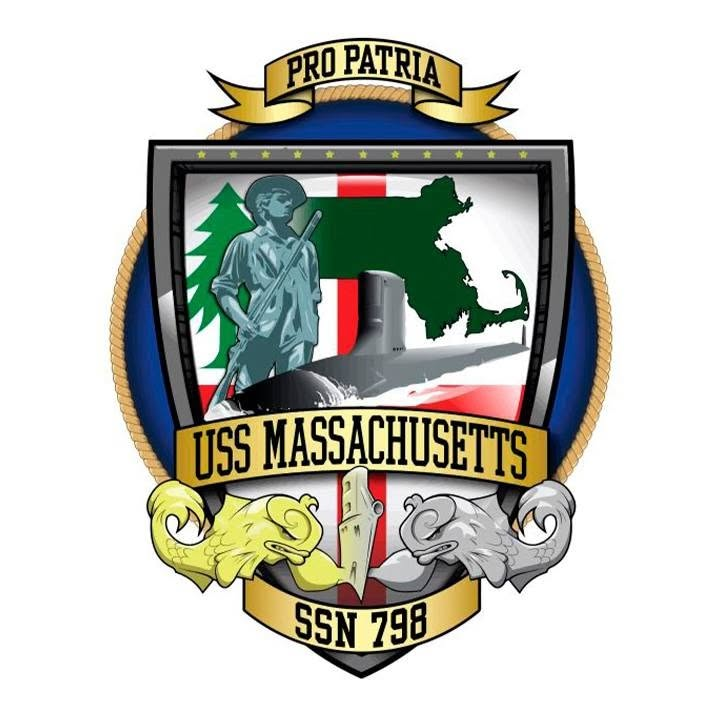
Crest of Massachusetts SSN-798

== History ==
SSN-798 was part of a $17.6 billion contract awarded by the United States Navy to prime contractor General Dynamics Electric Boat to construct 10 Virginia-class submarines. Ray Mabus, then Secretary of the Navy, announced the name Massachusetts on 8 November 2015 in an opinion piece for The Boston Globe. She became the first Navy vessel to be named after the Commonwealth since the battleship USS Massachusetts (BB-59), which was decommissioned in 1947. She became the eighth ship of the Navy or Revenue-Marine (precursor to the Coast Guard) to be named after the Commonwealth of Massachusetts.

Her keel was laid 11 December 2020 at Newport News Shipbuilding, in a virtual ceremony due to the COVID-19 pandemic. She was christened by ship sponsor Sheryl Sandberg on 6 May 2023. In November 2023, Secretary of the Navy Carlos Del Toro advised that Boston would be the site of her ship commissioning.

She completed her initial sea trials on 7 October 2025. The Navy accepted delivery on 21 November 2025. Her commissioning ceremony occurred on 28 March 2026 at the Conley Terminal in South Boston. She was placed in commission with USS Constitution under tow nearby, and with three Medal of Honor recipients in attendance: Thomas G. Kelley, Thomas Payne, and Ryan M. Pitts.

On 17 August 2026, the Navy has decided that the USS Massachusetts is ready to proceed to the fleet without the usual post-shakedown availability (PSA) in dry dock. Vice Adm. Rob Gaucher, Director of Submarine Programs stated that it is a “calculated risk.”

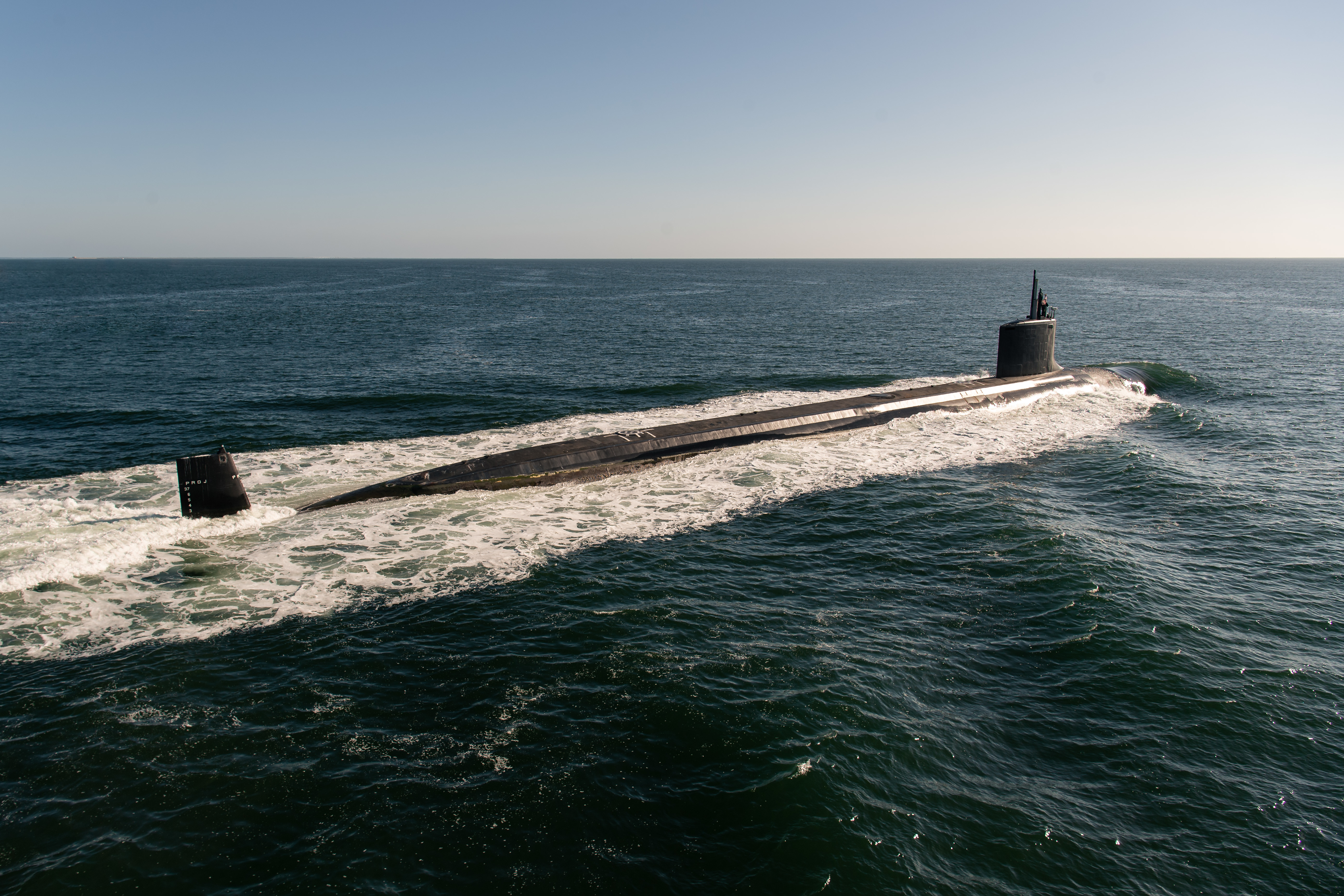
Stern view during sea trials

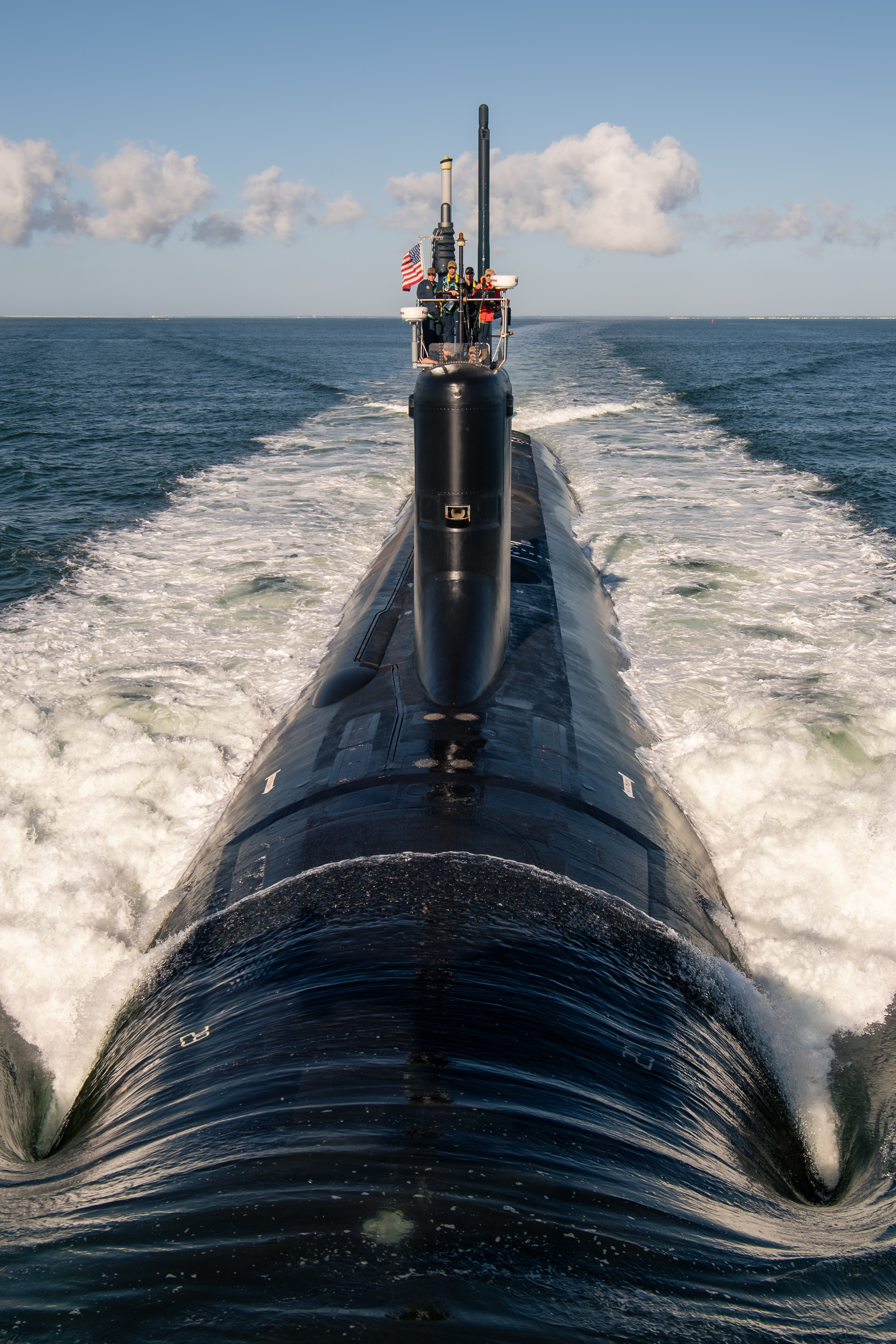
View from above the bow
