= Massachusetts Naval Militia =

Massachusetts State Navy Massachusetts Naval Militia
- The Pine Tree Flag, the ensign of the Massachusetts State Navy
- Active: 1775–1783; 1812–1815; 1898
- Country: United Colonies; United States
- Branch: Navy
- Motto: "An Appeal to Heaven"
- Engagements: American Revolutionary War; Penobscot Expedition; War of 1812; Spanish–American War

Commanders
- Notable commanders: Jeremiah O'Brien; John Foster Williams; Jonathan Haraden; George Little

The Massachusetts State Navy was the state navy of Massachusetts during the American Revolutionary War. It was founded on December 29, 1775 to defend the state's commerce and coastal communities along with engaging in offensive operations against British forces and merchant ships. The state navy acquired 25 vessels over the course of the war, which were used in varying roles such as cruisers, prison ships and dispatch boats. Its most prominent engagement was the 1779 Penobscot Expedition, during which the state navy was entirely destroyed. The Massachusetts State Navy was disbanded on June 4, 1783 when its last ship was sold.

During the War of 1812, the state navy was raised again in 1812 to perform the same actions as it had done during the Revolutionary War before being disbanded in 1815 with the war's end. The Massachusetts Naval Militia was raised in 1898 to assist the United States Navy and defend Massachusetts, but saw no action before being disbanded in the same year. Under 10 U.S. Code §7851, naval militias form part of the United States militia and therefore are considered as such. Any attempt to reactivate a naval militia in Massachusetts must be done either by the governor of Massachusetts or the Massachusetts General Court.

== Authorization ==
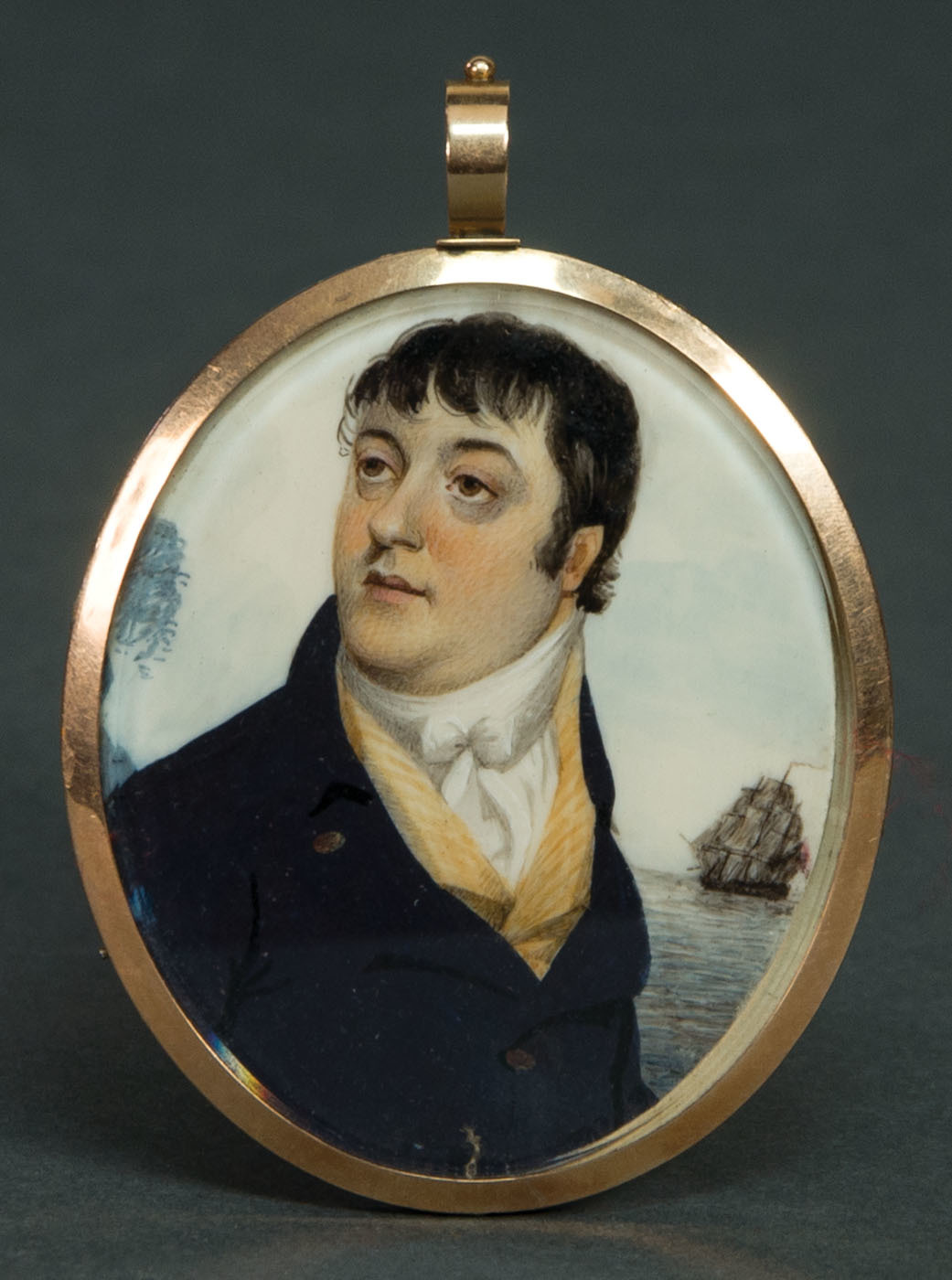
Jeremiah O'Brien, a captain in the Massachusetts State Navy

Following the outbreak of the American Revolutionary War with the Battles of Lexington and Concord in April 1775, the Massachusetts Provincial Congress, which effectively controlled the Province of Massachusetts Bay, began discussing the need for naval defenses against attacks by the Royal Navy against coastal communities in the province. A committee set up for the purpose on June 7 submitted a report on June 12 recommending the outfitting of at least six vessels, mounting up to fourteen guns, that would be managed by the province's Committee of Safety.

Further discussion was apparently delayed by the Battle of Bunker Hill on June 17, and was not taken up again until August. In the interim, the Provincial Congress was replaced by the Massachusetts Great and General Court as the province's legislative body, with a council acting as the executive. It received a petition in August from the town of Machias in the District of Maine (now the state of Maine) for protection and relief following the June Battle of Machias, in which a British sloop-of-war was captured, and the capture in July of two more British ships. The legislature responded by officially adopting Machias Liberty and Diligence, appointing Jeremiah O'Brien their commander, with authorization to hire up to thirty seamen. These two ships served the state until October 1776.

On November 1, the Massachusetts legislature enacted a law authorizing the issuance of letters of marque, as well as the creation of admiralty courts for judging naval disputes and the disposition of captured prize ships and cargo. On February 7, 1776, it enacted a law authorizing the construction of ten sloops, to carry fourteen to sixteen guns each, and approved £10,000 for their construction.

== Ships, 1776 to 1779 ==
The first ships constructed were the sloop Tyrannicide and the brigantines Rising Empire and Independence, which were ready to sail in June 1776. These were followed by the sloops Republic, Freedom, and Massachusetts in September. While they were being built, additional legislation was enacted, establishing pay scales and rules for prize distribution, and in October a Board of War was created to oversee naval activities (military as well as economic) of the state.

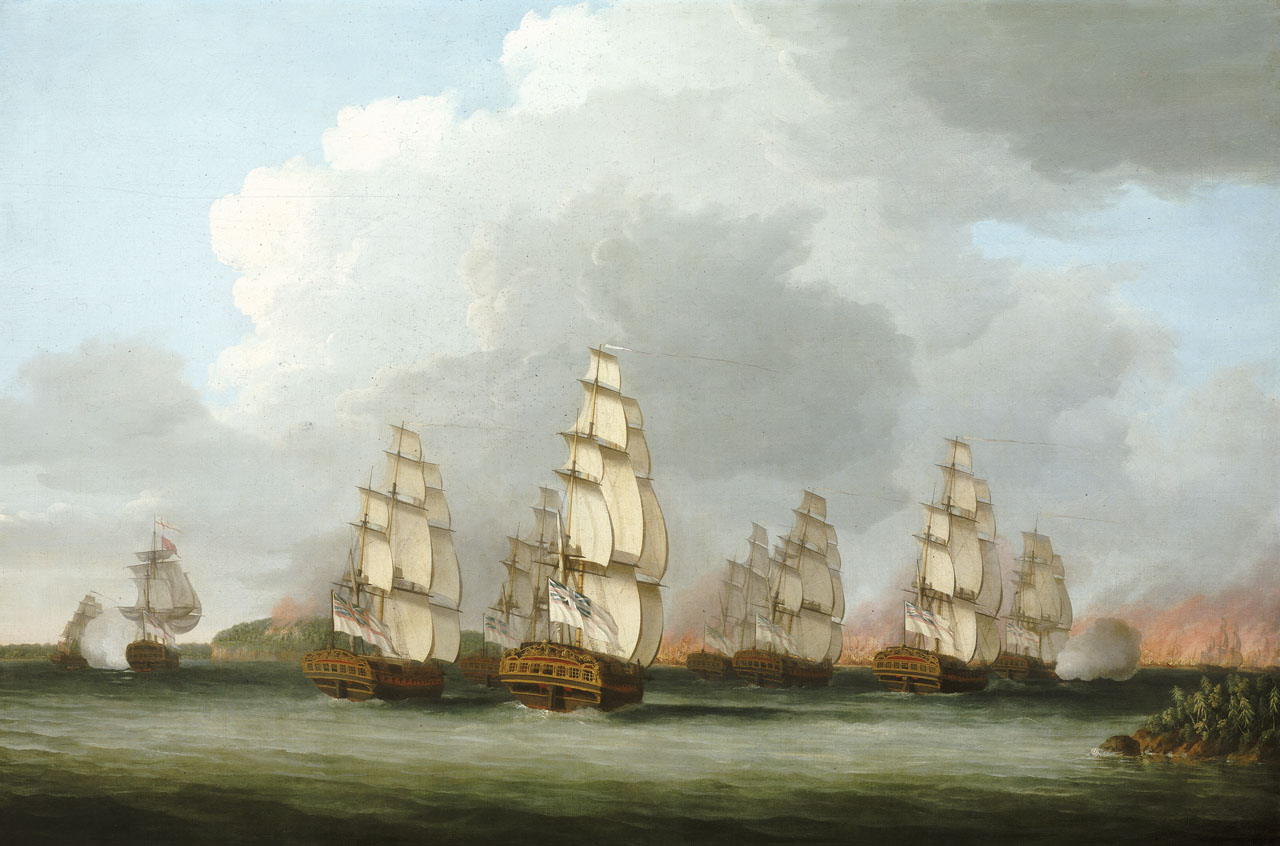
c. 1779 painting of the Penobscot Expedition; the Massachusetts State Navy warship Hunter is shown first from left.

Over the course of the war, several additional ships were either purchased or constructed by the state. In 1777, the brigantine Hazard was built, and in 1778 a plan to construct two larger ships was entertained and eventually abandoned due to the cost. The brigantine Active, a prize taken by Hazard, was purchased in 1779. In April 1778, construction was authorized on the largest ship in the state navy. Protector, a 28-gun frigate and a crew complement of 200, was launched in the fall of 1779. Unfortunately, due to the disaster of the Penobscot Expedition, it was then the only ship in the state navy.

== New Constitution ==
Administration of the navy was changed with the adoption in 1780 of a new state constitution. The governor was responsible for issuing commissions and orders, and the Agent of the Commonwealth was responsible for outfitting the state's ships, and the Board of War ceased to exist.

== Ships, 1780 to 1783 ==
The state continued to authorize new ships for the navy. In the spring of 1780 the Mars was purchased, and the Defence was purchased in 1781. During the following winter and spring, Tartar and Winthrop, the last ship commissioned into the navy, were constructed for the state.

== Privateering and prizes ==
The state issued nearly 1,000 letters of marque authorizing privateering activities. The Massachusetts prize courts were busiest in 1779, when more than 180 prizes were adjudicated. This activity resulted in a demand for prison capacity for the captured crews, and the competition between the state navy and the privateers resulted in increased costs to the state to man its ships.

== Naval activities ==
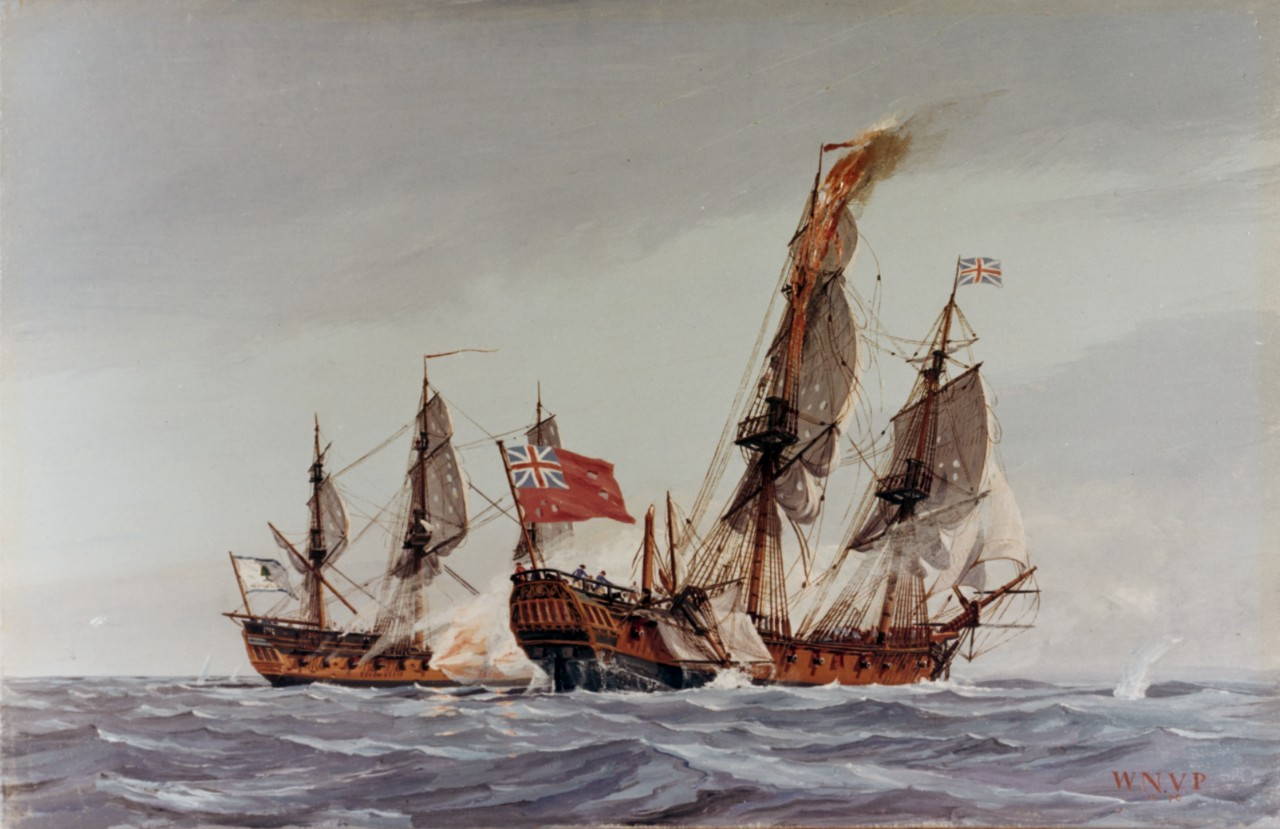
Protector (left) engaging Admiral Duff on 9 June 1780

While the state's ships were most often patrolling in nearby waters, they ranged as far as the European coast, where prizes were sometimes taken (although those were also often recovered by the British). Its ships sometimes worked in concert with privateers, Continental Navy vessels, and French vessels. On 25 November 1776, HMS Hope, a 14-gun brig with a crew of 70 men under the command of Lieutenant George (or James) Dawson, captured Independence, Captain Simeon Sampson, after a hard fight during which Dawson out sailed Sampson. As Independence had a larger crew and outgunned Hope she should have prevailed, but superior sailing, tactics, and a better crew delivered the victory to Hope.

Hope escorted Independence to Fort Cumberland, where 14 of her guns were transferred to the fort's defenses. On 5 May 1781, HMS Roebuck and HMS Medea captured Protector. The Royal Navy took her into service as HMS Hussar, and then sold her in 1783. The Danish East India Company purchased her and she continued to sail at least through 1785 as Hussar. Still, most of the Massachusetts navy's engagements were minor, involving only a small number of ships, and little or no combat. The most notable exception was the Penobscot Expedition, organized by the state in response to a British expedition that established a fortified base on the eastern shore of Penobscot Bay.

The naval component of the state's response included three ships of the state navy, one from the New Hampshire State Navy, three Continental Navy vessels, and numerous private vessels, including transports for the 1,000 militia that were sent to dislodge the British. The operation was a fiasco. The Continental Navy's Commodore Dudley Saltonstall, who commanded the fleet, disagreed with Solomon Lovell, the militia commander, over the overall command of the expedition. When a British fleet arrived, Saltonstall's fleet disintegrated. Ships surrendered, grounded and burned, or were abandoned after fleeing up the Penobscot River. The expedition has been called the worst United States naval defeat prior to the Japanese attack on Pearl Harbor in World War II. Inquiries into the matter faulted Saltonstall for his actions; he was dismissed from the navy. The navy continued in operations until June 4, 1783, when the Winthrop, the last ship owned by the state, was sold.

== Captains ==
The list of names is from Paullin unless otherwise cited; other fields are from other sources.

Captain	Years of service	Ships
Jeremiah O'Brien		Machias Liberty, Diligence
John Lambert		
John Fisk		Tyrannicide, Massachusetts
John Foster Williams		Massachusetts, Republic, Hazard, Protector
John Clouston		Freedom
Jonathan Haraden		Tyrannicide
Daniel Souther		
Simeon Samson		Independence, Hazard, and Mars
Richard Welden		
Allen Hallet		Tyrannicide, Republic, Active, Tartar
James Nevens		
John Cathcart		Tyrannicide
George Little		Winthrop

== Ships ==
The list of names, ship type, and years of service are from Paullin unless otherwise cited; other fields are from other sources.

Ship	Type (guns)	Years of service	Captains
Machias Liberty	sloop (10–20)	1775–1776	O'Brien
Diligent	schooner (10–20)	1775–1776	O'Brien
Tyrannicide	brigantine (at first a sloop) (14)	1776–1779	Fisk, Haraden, Hallet, Cathcart
Rising Empire	brigantine (10–20)	1776–1777	
Independence	brigantine (14 × 6-pounder guns, 10 × 4-pounder guns, 10 swivel guns, + 2 × coehorns)	1776	Simeon Sampson, or Samson
Republic	sloop (10–20)	1776–1777	Williams, Hallet
Freedom	brigantine (12)	1776–1777	John Clouston
Massachusetts	brigantine (10–20)	1776–1778	Williams
Hazard	brigantine (10–20)	1777–1779	Williams
Active	brigantine (10–20)	1779	Hallet
Lincoln	galley	1779–1781	
Protector	frigate (26)	1779–1781	Williams
Mars	ship (10–20)	1780–1781	
Defence	sloop (10–20)	1781	
Tartar	ship (10–20)	1782–1783	Hallet
Winthrop	sloop (10–20)	1782–1783	Little
