= George Little (naval officer) =

American naval officer (1754–1809)

- Born: April 10, 1754; Marshfield, Massachusetts
- Died: July 22, 1809 (aged 55); Weymouth, Massachusetts
- Military career
- Allegiance: United States
- Branch: Massachusetts State Navy; United States Navy
- Service years: 1779–1801
- Rank: Captain
- Commands: Winthrop; Meriam; USS Boston
- Conflicts: American Revolutionary War; Quasi-War

Captain George Little (10 April 1754 – 22 July 1809) was an American naval officer who served in the Massachusetts State Navy during the Revolutionary War and the United States Navy during the Quasi-War.

== Military career ==
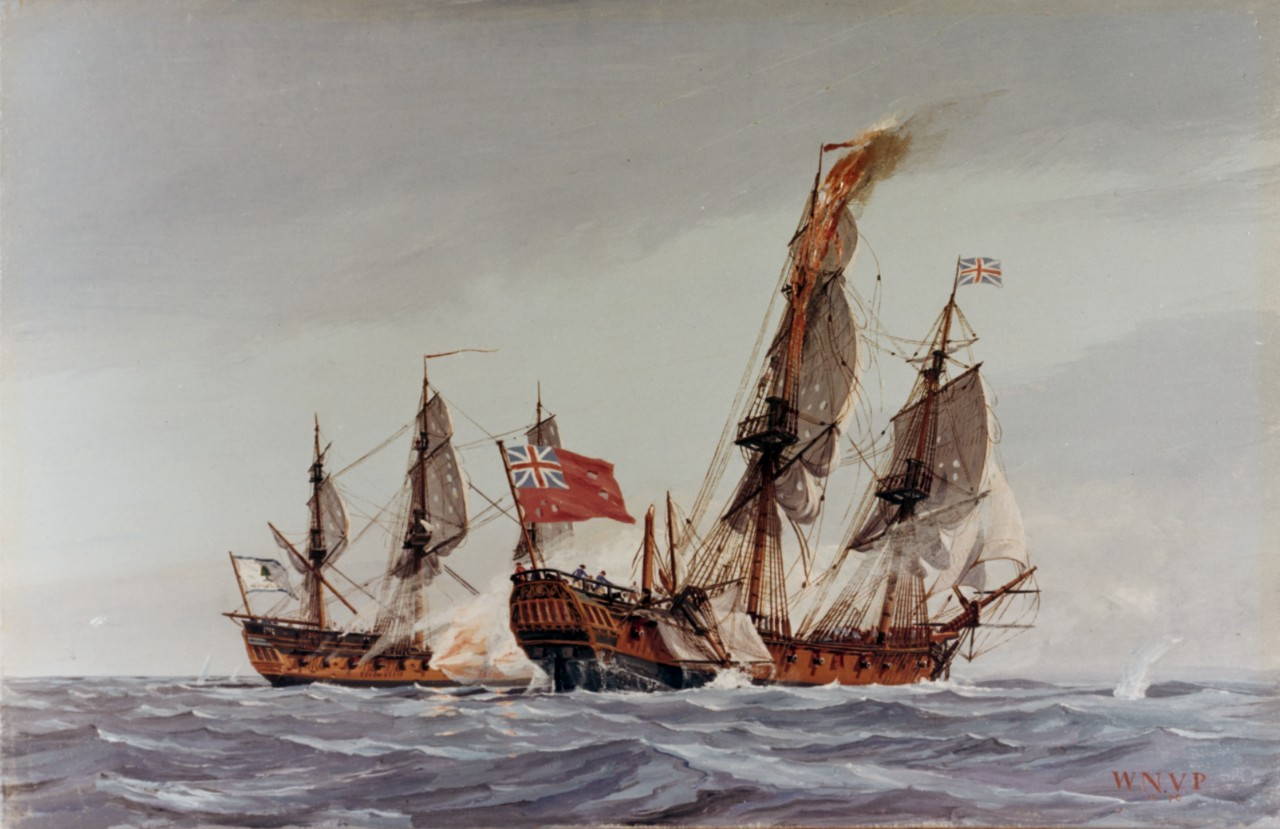
Protector (left) engaging Admiral Duff on 9 June 1780

In 1779, Little was appointed as the first lieutenant onboard the 28-gun Massachusetts State Navy frigate Protector. He participated in Protector's running battle with the British ship Thames, and on May 5, 1781 HMS Roebuck and HMS Medea captured Protector off Sandy Hook, New Jersey. Little was imprisoned but eventually escape from British captivity. He was given command of the Massachusetts State Navy sloop Winthrop, capturing two British privateers, the armed brig Merian, and a number of other vessels.

On March 4, 1799, Little was commissioned into the United States Navy at the rank of captain and given command of the frigate USS Boston, which was still under construction. At the end of June, Little served as member of the first US Navy court-martial, that of John Blake Cordis, second lieutenant of the USS Constitution and brother-in-law of Little's first lieutenant, Robert Haswell. Boston sailed 24 July, on the first of two cruises down the American coast to the West Indies. The next year saw a second cruise, which culminated with the capture of the French corvette Berceau and seven other ships.

On their return, Little found himself in the middle of a political firestorm, the capture of Le Berceau having taken place two weeks after the signing of the Convention of 1800 had ended the Quasi-War. He and his fellow officers faced a court-martial for the alleged looting of the personal possessions of Berceau's officers, of which they would be acquitted but not without Little being dismissed from the US Navy in 1801. This was not his only legal fight, as a challenge to the legitimacy of the taking of the Danish merchantman Flying Fish, would result in a legal case which, as Little v. Barreme, was heard by the United States Supreme Court in 1804, the ruling going against Little. Little also fought in court over an agreement with Silas Talbot to split the prize money for Les Deux Anges, taken by Boston in January 1800. This case, Talbot v. Little, also reached the Supreme Court, but was eventually dismissed without hearing, leaving Little and his crew the victors.

== Namesakes ==
Two destroyers have been named USS Little in his honor.
