= USS Little =

Two ships in the United States Navy have been named USS Little for Captain George Little.

- USS Little (DD-79), was a Wickes-class destroyer, launched in 1918. In 1940 she was later redesignated a high-speed transport with the hull symbol APD-4. She was sunk in action off Guadalcanal in 1942.
- USS Little (DD-803), was a Fletcher-class destroyer, launched in 1944. She was sunk in action during the Battle of Okinawa in 1945.
