= USRC Massachusetts =

Ship of the U.S. Revenue Cutter Service (1791)

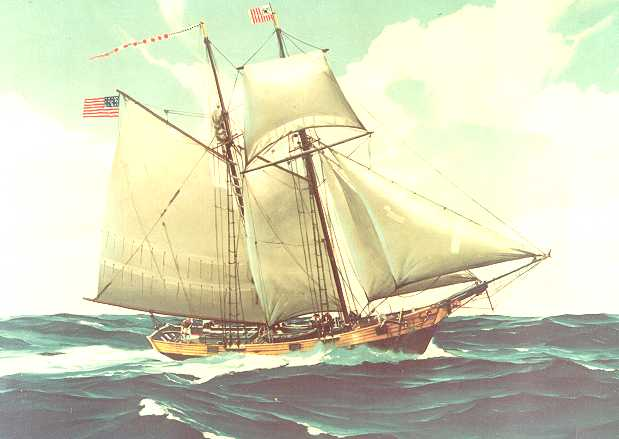
- A Revenue Marine cutter, possibly Massachusetts

History

United States
- Name: Massachusetts
- Operator: Revenue Cutter Service
- Builder: Searle & Tyler, Newburyport, Massachusetts
- Cost: US$2,050
- Launched: 23 July 1791
- Commissioned: 1791
- Decommissioned: 1792
- Fate: Sold 9 Oct 1792

General characteristics
- Class & type: Schooner
- Displacement: 70 & 43/95 tons
- Length: 60 ft (18 m) (Note: U.S. Coast Guard Historian's Office website claims 60 ft 9 in (18.52 m) overall.)
- Beam: 17 ft 8 in (5.38 m)
- Draft: 7 ft 8 in (2.34 m)
- Propulsion: Sail
- Complement: 4 officers
- Crew: 4 crewmen, 2 boys
- Armament: 4-6 swivel guns

USRC Massachusetts was one of the first ten cutters operated by the Revenue-Marine (later to become the US Coast Guard). She was built in Newburyport, Massachusetts, and served out of Boston. Massachusetts by tradition is held to be the first revenue cutter to enter active service. She was also the first to be decommissioned, having a very short service life of only about 15 months before being sold.

== Description ==
A contemporary description, provided by the Collector of Customs at Boston, Mr. Benjamin Lincoln to the Secretary of the Treasury, Alexander Hamilton, noted:

Agreeably to your orders I here send you a description of the Cutter Massachusetts built at Newbury port in the Commonwealth of Massachusetts in the year 1791. She has on [sic: one] deck, two masts her length is sixty feet above her upper deck her depth is seven feet Eight inches, breadth seventeen feet eight inches she measures seventy tons 43/95. She is a square-stern schooner, has quarter badges, an Indian's head for figurehead. She has a long quarter deck and a deep waist."

Dr. John Tilley noted that "the Massachusetts was a two-masted schooner of 70 43/95 tons burden, 60 ' in length, with a beam of 17' 8" and depth of hold of 7' 8". The ship had a long quarterdeck, deep bulwarks, and an armament of either four of six swivel guns. The contract signed by Searle and Tyler called for two boats and seven sails: mainsail, foresail, jib, flying jib, fore topsail, main topsail, and squaresail." The cutter ended up being larger than originally authorized as her first master, John Foster Williams, ordered an increase in her size without first seeking departmental approval. Her cost was therefore considerably over the original estimate. Nevertheless, the government accepted her as built.

== Operational service ==
Although she was launched later than a number of other cutters, by tradition she is considered to be the first to actually enter active service.

There are a number of surviving documents regarding her history. A journal, kept by second mate Nathaniel Nichols, has turned up and gives a glimpse of what life was like on this cutter. He faithfully recorded his thoughts and actions from 31 October 1791 through 16 June 1793.

"No Revenue Cutter in Secretary of the Treasury Alexander Hamilton's 'system of cutters' saw shorter Federal service than the first [cutter named] Massachusetts, a 70-ton schooner built in Newburyport, Massachusetts in 1791. One of the first ten armed vessels of the United States ordered to patrol the Atlantic Coast to protect the revenue, she was too costly to please Alexander Hamilton, too expensive to operate to please General Benjamin Lincoln, and too slow to please her Master, Captain John Foster Williams. They sold her in October 1792 and replaced her the following spring with a smaller, livelier cutter, the sloop Massachusetts II."

== Original officers ==
John Foster Williams, Master; 1791-1792
Hezekiah Welch, First Mate; Charlestown, Massachusetts
Nathaniel Nichols, Second Mate, Cohasset, Massachusetts
Sylvanus Coleman, Third Mate, Nantucket, Massachusetts

== Notes ==
=== References cited ===
- "Massachusetts, 1791" (pdf). Cutters, Craft & U.S. Coast Guard-Manned Army & Navy Vessels. U.S. Coast Guard Historian's Office.
- "Record of Movements, Vessels of the United States Coast Guard, 1790–December 31, 1933" (pdf). U.S. Coast Guard, Department of Transportation. 1989.
- Canney, Donald L. (1995). U.S. Coast Guard and Revenue Cutters, 1790–1935. Naval Institute Press, Annapolis, Maryland. ISBN 978-1-55750-101-1.
- Chapelle, Howard I. (1935): The History of American Sailing Ships, New York: Bonanza Books.
- Dixon, Robert Jr. (1966): Captain Gross's Arms and Stores. Coast Guard Academy Alumni Association The Bulletin (April–May 1966), pp. 95–100.
- Evans, Stephen H. (1949). The United States Coast Guard 1790–1915: A Definitive History (With a Postscript: 1915-1950). Naval Institute Press, Annapolis, Maryland.
- Kern, Florence, 1976: John Foster Williams' U.S. Revenue Cutter Massachusetts, 1791-1792 "To Stand the Trials." Washington, D.C.: Alised Enterprises.
- King, Irving H. (1989). The Coast Guard Under Sail: The U.S. Revenue Cutter Service, 1789–1865. Naval Institute Press, Annapolis, Maryland. ISBN 978-0-87021-234-5.
