= USRC Massachusetts II =

Ship of the U.S. Revenue Cutter Service (1793)

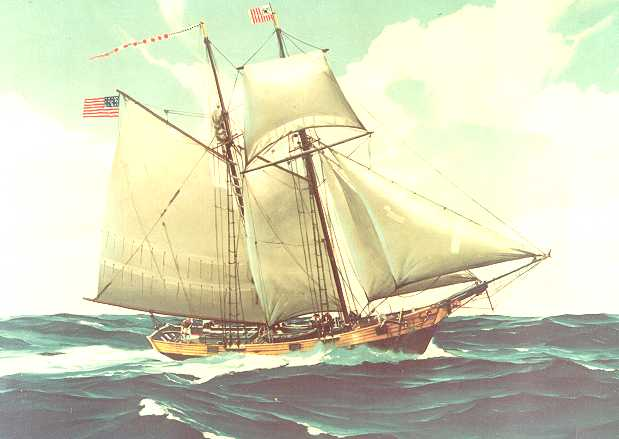
- A Revenue Marine cutter, possibly Massachusetts II

History

United States
- Name: Massachusetts II
- Operator: Revenue Cutter Service
- Builder: Adna Bates, Cohasset, Massachusetts
- Cost: US$1,600
- Completed: June 1793
- Fate: Sold June 1804 for US$900

General characteristics
- Class & type: Sloop
- Displacement: less than 45 tons
- Propulsion: Sail
- Complement: 2 officers, 4 crewmen

Massachusetts II was a small sloop operated by the Revenue-Marine used in the collection of customs duties. (Note: The Revenue-Marine was the early name for the United States Revenue Cutter Service which merged in 1915 with the United States Life-Saving Service to form the United States Coast Guard.) She was completed in June 1793 and replaced Massachusetts, one of the first ten cutters of the Revenue-Marine, when it was determined that the older ship was too large and slow to perform her assigned tasks. Massachusetts II was constructed by Adna Bates of Cohasset, Massachusetts for a cost of US$1,600. Her area of operation was along the Massachusetts coast as a smaller less expensive replacement to the original Massachusetts. When the original Massachusetts was sold at auction, the second and third mates were discharged and Massachusetts II was crewed by two officers and four sailors.

Massachusetts II was sold in June 1804 for US$900.
