= Defense =

Defense or defence may refer to:

== Tactical, martial, and political acts or groups ==
- Defense (military), forces primarily intended for warfare
- Civil defense, the organizing of civilians to deal with emergencies or enemy attacks
- Defense industry, industry which manufactures and sells weapons and military technology
- Self-defense, the use of force to defend oneself
- Haganah (Hebrew for "The Defence"), a paramilitary organization in British Palestine
- National security, security of a nation state, its citizens, economy, and institutions, as a duty of government
  - Defence diplomacy, pursuit of foreign policy objectives through the peaceful employment of defence resources
  - Ministry of defence or department of defense, a part of government which regulates the armed forces
  - Defence minister, a cabinet position in charge of a ministry of defense
- International security, measures taken by states and international organizations to ensure mutual survival and safety

== Sports ==
- Defense (sports), the action of preventing an opponent from scoring
  - Defender (association football), an outfield player whose primary role is to prevent the opposing team from scoring goals
  - Defenceman (ice hockey), a player, other than the goaltender, in a defensive position
  - Defensive batting, a method of avoiding being out in cricket

== Law ==
- Defense (legal), an attempt to avoid criminal or civil liability
- Defence of property, argument that a defendant should not be held liable for any loss caused while acting to protect their property
- Right of self-defense, the right for people to use reasonable force to defend themselves

== Places ==
- Defence, Karachi, a neighbourhood located within Clifton Cantonment of Karachi, Pakistan
- La Défense, a business district near Paris
  - The Grande Arche, commonly known as Arche de la Défense, near Paris

== Other uses ==
- The Defence (TV series), a 2018 Polish television series
- Defense (chess), a chess opening by Black
- Defence (ship), name of several ships
  - HMS Defence, Royal Navy ships of this name
- Thesis defense, oral examination required for certain advanced degrees
- Defence mechanisms, unconscious psychological mechanisms that reduce anxiety
- "The Defence", a song by Black Midi from Hellfire

== See also ==
- Defender (disambiguation)
- Biological defense (disambiguation)
- National defense (disambiguation)
- Protection (disambiguation)
