= Defence (ship) =

Defence as a ship name may refer to:

- Defence (1735 EIC ship) was launched at Deptford. She made three voyages to India, the Red Sea, and China for the British East India Company (EIC) between 1736 and 1743 before she was sold out of the EIC's service
- Defence (1776 brigantine), a ship of the Connecticut State Navy, sunk in March 1779 after striking a reef in the Thames River
- Defence (1779 brigantine), a privateer sunk in Maine in 1779 in the final stages of the Penobscot Expedition
- Defence (1780 brigantine), a privateer operated by the same syndicate that built the 1779 ship
- Defence (1803 ship) launched at Shields. She spent much of her career as a London-based transport. In the 1820s she sailed between Scotland and North America, particularly to Canada. She was wrecked in March 1832.

== See also ==
- HMS Defence - one of four vessels of the Royal Navy
- USS Defense (AM-317)
