= Preservation =

Preservation may refer to:

== Heritage and conservation ==
- Preservation (library and archive), activities aimed at prolonging the life of a record while making as few changes as possible
- Preservation (magazine), published by the National Trust for Historic Preservation
- Historic preservation, endeavor to preserve, conserve and protect buildings, objects, landscapes or other artifacts
- Conservation and restoration of cultural heritage, protection and care of tangible cultural heritage

== Mathematics and computer science ==
- Type preservation, property of a type system if evaluation of expressions does not cause their type to change
- Case preservation, when computer storage preserves the distinction between upper and lower case
- Digital preservation, endeavor to ensure that digital information of continuing value remains accessible and usable

== Arts and entertainment ==
- Preservation, a 2019 novel by Jock Serong
- Preservation (film), a 2014 horror thriller film
- Preservation Act 1, 1973 album by The Kinks
  - Preservation Act 2, 1974 album by The Kinks
  - "Preservation" (song), a 1974 non-album single by The Kinks
- Preservation Hall, jazz venue in New Orleans, Louisiana
- "Preservation" (Doctors), a 2003 television episode
- Preservation, a 2017 album by Nadia Reid

== People ==
The name Preserved is a nearly-extinct given name, primarily for males, that was primarily common in the 18th and 19th centuries, that originated from the Quaker community:

- Preserved Fish, businessman
- Preserved Smith, historian

== Other uses ==
- Preservation Island, Tasmania, Australia
  - Preservation Islets, group of small granite islands northwest of Preservation Island
- Food preservation, preserving food for later use
  - Preservative, chemicals used to hinder deterioration of food, wood, etc.
- Self-preservation, behavior that ensures the survival of an organism

== See also ==
- Conservation (disambiguation)
- Heritage (disambiguation)
- Preserve (disambiguation)
- Protection (disambiguation)
- Heritage Preservation, an American non-profit organization to preserve the nation's heritage
- National Preservation, a British-based online company that specialises in retail and discussion among railway enthusiasts
