= Preserved (name) =

Preserved is a nearly extinct male given name, that reportedly originated in the Quaker community in the New England region of the United States in the 18th century. It is regarded as a virtue name. Notable people with the name include:

- Francis Preserved Leavenworth (1858–1928), American astronomer
- Henry Preserved Smith (1847–1927), American biblical scholar
- Preserved Fish (1766–1846), American shipping merchant and businessman
- Preserved Smith (1880–1941), American historian of the Protestant Reformation, son of Henry
