= Preserve =

The word preserve may refer to:

== Common uses ==
- Fruit preserves, a type of sweet spread or condiment
- Nature reserve, an area of importance for wildlife, flora, fauna or other special interest, usually protected

== Arts, entertainment, and media ==
- Preserve, a 2004 compilation involving the band Wow & Flutter
- "Preserve", a 2013 season 2 episode of The Mind of a Chef

== Other uses ==
- Preserve (company), an American sustainable consumer goods company
- Preserve (horse), a British Thoroughbred racehorse

== See also ==
- Food preservation
- Preservation (disambiguation)
- Protection (disambiguation)
