= List of shipwrecks in March 1832 =

The list of shipwrecks in March 1832 includes ships sunk, foundered, grounded, or otherwise lost during March 1832.

== 1 March ==
List of shipwrecks: 1 March 1832
Ship	State	Description
Catherina and Carmelita	Kingdom of Sardinia	The ship was destroyed by fire at Havana, Cuba.

== 2 March ==
List of shipwrecks: 2 March 1832
Ship	State	Description
Amy	United Kingdom	The ship was driven ashore at Whitby, Yorkshire. She was later refloated.
Antelope	United Kingdom	The ship was driven ashore at Whitby. She was later refloated.
Atlas	United Kingdom	The ship was driven ashore at Whitby. She was later refloated.
Bell	United Kingdom	The ship struck a sunken rock off the Isle of Glass Lighthouse and was wrecked.
Blossom	United Kingdom	The ship was driven ashore at Whitby. She was later refloated.
General Murray	United Kingdom	The ship was driven ashore at Whitby. She was later refloated.
Thomas Ferguson	United Kingdom	The ship was driven ashore at Whitby. She was later refloated.
Wansbeck	United Kingdom	The ship was driven ashore at Whitby. She was later refloated.

== 3 March ==
List of shipwrecks: 3 March 1832
Ship	State	Description
Ellen	United Kingdom	The ship was driven ashore near Ravenglass, Cumberland. She was on a voyage from Liverpool, Lancashire to Dublin. Ellen was refloated on 17 March and taken in to Ravenglass.
Hoop	Netherlands	The ship departed from Emden, Kingdom of Hanover for Schiedam, South Holland. No further trace, presumed foundered in the North Sea with the loss of all hands.
Prince of Wales	United Kingdom	The ship was wrecked on the Trinity Sand, in the North Sea off the mouth of the Humber with the loss of all hands. She was on a voyage from London to Gainsborough, Lincolnshire.

== 4 March ==
List of shipwrecks: 4 March 1832
Ship	State	Description
Cambray	United Kingdom	The ship was driven ashore on Colonsay, Inner Hebrides. She was on a voyage from Letterkenny, County Donegal to Bristol, Gloucestershire.
Lady Warde	United Kingdom	The ship was wrecked at Oistin's Point, Barbados. Her crew were rescued. She was on a voyage from Berbice to Barbados.
Thistle	United Kingdom	The ship was driven ashore and wrecked near Westport, County Mayo.

== 5 March ==
List of shipwrecks: 5 March 1832
Ship	State	Description
Belinda	United Kingdom	The ship was wrecked in the Bass Strait. She was on a voyage from Launceston to Hobart, Van Diemen's Land.
Britannia	United Kingdom	The ship departed from Wigton, Cumberland for Liverpool, Lancashire. No further trace, presumed foundered in the Irish Sea with the loss of all hands.
Dolphin	United Kingdom	The sloop foundered in the North Sea off Bervie, Aberdeenshire. Her crew were rescued by the smack Mansfield (United Kingdom). Dolphin was on a voyage from Aberdeen to Sunderland, County Durham.
Success	United Kingdom	The ship foundered off the Dudgeon Sandbank, in the North Sea off the coast of Norfolk. Her crew were rescued. She was on a voyage from Newcastle upon Tyne, Northumberland to Great Yarmouth, Norfolk.
Westmoreland	United Kingdom	The sloop was wrecked near Dundrum, County Down with the loss of all hands. She was on a voyage from Portrush, County Antrim to Liverpool.

== 6 March ==
List of shipwrecks: 6 March 1832
Ship	State	Description
Ann	United Kingdom	The ship was driven ashore and wrecked at Montrose, Forfarshire. Her crew were rescued by the Montrose Lifeboat. She was in a voyage from Glasgow, Renfrewshire to Arbroath, Forfarshire.
Annie	United Kingdom	The ship was driven ashore and wrecked at Montrose. Her crew were rescued by the Montrose Lifeboat. She was on a voyage from Aberdeen to Arbroath.
Atalanta	United Kingdom	The sloop struck the Beacon Rock, off Leith, Lothian and was severely damaged.
Commerce	United Kingdom	The ship ran aground on the Kentish Knock, in the North Sea off the coast of Kent and foundered. She was on a voyage from Harwich, Essex to Portsmouth, Hampshire.
Cookson	United Kingdom	The ship was driven ashore and wrecked in Ballycarry Bay. Her crew were rescued. She was on a voyage from Belfast, County Antrim to Maryport, Cumberland.
Dolphin	United Kingdom	The ship sprang a leak and capsized in the North Sea. Her crew were rescued. She was on a voyage from Aberdeen to Sunderland, County Durham.
Île de Graix	France	The ship was wrecked on Terschelling, Friesland, Netherlands. Her crew were rescued. She was on a voyage from La Rochelle, Charente-Maritime to Hamburg.
Lady Forbes	United Kingdom	The ship was driven ashore at Aberdeen. Her crew were rescued. She was on a voyage from Fraserburgh, Aberdeenshire to Leith, Lothian.
Leonidas	France	The ship was wrecked on the Îlots des Moines, Corsica. She was on a voyage from Constantinople, Ottoman Empire to Marseille, Bouches-du-Rhône.
Mantua	United Kingdom	The ship was wrecked on the Spanish Battery Rocks, off South Shields, County Durham. Her crew were rescued.
Richard	United Kingdom	The sailing barge capsized off Lowestoft, Suffolk.
Robert and Sarah	United Kingdom	The ship struck the Dudgeon Sandbank, in the North Sea off the coast of Norfolk and sank. Her crew were rescued.
Sophia	United Kingdom	The ship was driven ashore and wrecked at Montrose. Her crew were rescued. She was on a voyage from Aberdeen to Hull, Yorkshire.
Sussex Oak	United Kingdom	The brig was wrecked on the Cross Sand, in the North Sea off Lowestoft. Her crew were rescued by the brig John Stafford (United Kingdom). Sussex Oak was on a voyage from Littlehampton, Sussex to Sunderland.
Swallow	United Kingdom	The ship was driven ashore at Bridport, Dorset. She was on a voyage from Plymouth, Devon to Bridport. Swallow was refloated on 9 March and taken in to Bridport.
Vine	United Kingdom	The sloop was wrecked on the bar at Elie harbour, Fife. The crew of two and the Master were rescued by the Coastguard.
Willing Trader	United Kingdom	The ship struck the pier at Ramsgate, Kent and was beached. She was on a voyage from Littlehampton to Great Yarmouth, Norfolk.

== 7 March ==
List of shipwrecks: 7 March 1832
Ship	State	Description
Emstroome	Portugal	The ship was driven ashore at Belém. She was on a voyage from Riga, Russia to Figueira da Foz. She was refloated on 17 March.

== 8 March ==
List of shipwrecks: 8 March 1832
Ship	State	Description
Richard	United Kingdom	The ship capsized off Lowestoft, Suffolk. She was on a voyage from Great Yarmouth, Norfolk to London.

== 9 March ==
List of shipwrecks: 9 March 1832
Ship	State	Description
Enterprize	United States	The ship was wrecked on Watling Island, Bahamas. She was on a voyage from Savannah, Georgia to Jamaica.
Sybil	United States	The ship was wrecked on the "coast of St Michael", 8 leagues (24 nautical miles (44 km) west of the Île de Batz, Finistère with the loss thirteen of her seventeen crew. She was on a voyage from Havre de Grâce, Seine-Inférieure, France to Charleston, South Carolina.

== 10 March ==
List of shipwrecks: 10 March 1832
Ship	State	Description
Minerva	France	The ship foundered in the Bay of Biscay off Île d'Yeu, Vendée with the loss of all but four of her crew. She was on a voyage from Bordeaux, Gironde to Rotterdam, South Holland, Netherlands.

== 12 March ==
List of shipwrecks: 12 March 1832
Ship	State	Description
Brenda	(United Kingdom of Great Britain and Ireland) New South Wales	The brig was driven ashore and wrecked on Swan Island, Van Diemen's Land.
Wemyss	United Kingdom	The ship was driven ashore and wrecked at Dunure, Ayrshire. Her crew were rescued. She was on a voyage from Limerick to Glasgow, Renfrewshire.

== 13 March ==
List of shipwrecks: 13 March 1832
Ship	State	Description
Dart	(United Kingdom of Great Britain and Ireland) New South Wales	The cutter was wrecked at Port Macquarie. Her crew were rescued.
Eolus	Spain	The ship foundered in the Atlantic Ocean off Cape Finisterre. Her crew were rescued. She was on a voyage from St. Ubes to a Baltic port.

== 14 March ==
List of shipwrecks: 14 March 1832
Ship	State	Description
Hope	United Kingdom	The ship sprang a leak and foundered in the North Sea off Robin Hoods Bay, Yorkshire. Her crew were rescued. She was on a voyage from Sunderland, County Durham to Margate, Kent.

== 15 March ==
List of shipwrecks: 15 March 1832
Ship	State	Description
John and Isaac	United Kingdom	The ship was wrecked at Dublin. Her crew were rescued. She was on a voyage from Newry, County Antrim to Dublin.

== 17 March ==
List of shipwrecks: 17 March 1832
Ship	State	Description
Mary	United Kingdom	The ship was driven ashore on "Bornahard Point". She was on a voyage from Limerick to Glasgow, Renfrewshire.
Mentor	Hamburg	The ship ran aground off Amrum, Denmark and was abandoned by her crew. She was on a voyage from Havre de Grâce, Seine-Inférieure, France to Hamburg. Mentor was refloated on 28 March and taken in to Hamburg.
Nartsiss (Нарцисс, 'Narcissus')	Imperial Russian Navy	The brigantine was driven ashore at Anapa. Her crew survived. Subsequently refloated, repaired, and returned to service.

== 19 March ==
List of shipwrecks: 19 March 1832
Ship	State	Description
Belem Castle	United Kingdom	The ship was driven ashore and wrecked at Hoylake, Lancashire. She was on a voyage from Lisbon, Portugal to Liverpool, Lancashire.
Eliza	United Kingdom	The schooner ran aground on the Herd Sand, in the North Sea off North Shields, County Durham. Her crew were rescued by the South Shields Lifeboat. She was on a voyage from Sunderland, County Durham to Aberdeen.
Wemyss	United Kingdom	The ship was wrecked near Ayr. She was on a voyage from Limerick to Glasgow, Renfrewshire.

== 20 March ==
List of shipwrecks: 20 March 1832
Ship	State	Description
Penelope	United Kingdom	The ship was driven ashore at Hoylake. Her crew were rescued by the Hoylake Lifeboat and placed under quarantine. She was on a voyage from Alexandria, Egypt to Liverpool, Lancashire.

== 21 March ==
List of shipwrecks: 21 March 1832
Ship	State	Description
Strever	Netherlands	The ship was driven ashore and wrecked at Boulogne, Pas-de-Calais, France. She was on a voyage from Surinam to Amsterdam, North Holland.

== 22 March ==
List of shipwrecks: 22 March 1832
Ship	State	Description
Harriet	United Kingdom	The ship struck a rock off St David's Head, Pembrokeshire and consequently foundered with the loss of one life. She was on a voyage from Dublin to Barbados and Trinidad.
Meridian	United States	The ship was wrecked on Cape Hatteras, North Carolina. She was on a voyage from Charleston, South Carolina to Trieste.

== 24 March ==
List of shipwrecks: 24 March 1832
Ship	State	Description
Abraham and Moses	United Kingdom	The ship foundered in the North Sea off Aldeburgh, Suffolk. Her crew were rescued.

== 26 March ==
List of shipwrecks: 26 March 1832
Ship	State	Description
Alert	United Kingdom	The ship struck the West Mouse Rock, in the Irish Sea off the coast of Anglesey and consequently foundered with the loss of 134 of the 160 people on board. She was on a voyage from Dublin to Liverpool, Lancashire.

== 27 March ==
List of shipwrecks: 27 March 1832
Ship	State	Description
Coletta	United Kingdom	The ship was wrecked at Nieuwpoort, West Flanders, Belgium.. She was on a voyage from London to Nieuwpoort.

== 30 March ==
List of shipwrecks: 30 March 1832
Ship	State	Description
Ranger	United Kingdom	The ship collided with Romulus (United Kingdom) at Hellevoetsluis, South Holland, Netherlands. Both vessels sank.

== 31 March ==
List of shipwrecks: 31 March 1832
Ship	State	Description
De Rahm	France	The ship was wrecked on Long Island, New York, United States.
Defence	United Kingdom	The ship was sailing from Alloa to Quebec when she was wrecked near the entrance of Longhope. Her crew was saved.

== Unknown date ==
List of shipwrecks: Unknown date 1832
Ship	State	Description
Darling	(United Kingdom of Great Britain and Ireland) New South Wales	The schooner was wrecked in the Bay of Islands. Her crew were rescued.
Experiment	United Kingdom	The ship was driven ashore at Veere, Zeeland, Netherlands before 24 March. She was on a voyage from London to Ghent, Belgium.
Faithful	United Kingdom	The ship was lost on the Cork Sand, in the North Sea off the coast of Essex with the loss of at least three of her crew. She was on a voyage from Sunderland, County Durham to London. Five survivors were rescued by Spy (United Kingdom)
Lavinia	United Kingdom	The ship was wrecked on "the island of Java". She was on a voyage from Liverpool, Lancashire to Bremen.
