= Treaty of Frankfurt (1539) =

Agreement between Protestants and Holy Roman Emperor Charles V

The Treaty of Frankfurt, also known as the Truce of Frankfurt, was a formal agreement of peace between Charles V, Holy Roman Emperor and Protestants on 19 April 1539. The parties met at Frankfurt-on-the-Main, and the Lutherans were represented by Philip Melanchthon. The treaty stated that the emperor would not take any violent actions against the Protestants, who had formed an alliance known as the Schmalkaldic League, for fifteen months starting 1 May; during this time both parties could try to resolve the differences in their confessions. As a result of this peace, the Schmalkaldic League lost the protection of France.

== Bibliography ==
- Armstrong, Edward (1902). The Emperor Charles V. Macmillan.
- Hagenbach, Karl Rudolph (1879). History of the Reformation in Germany and Switzerland. trans. Evelina Moore.
- Smith, Henry Preserved (1920). The Age of the Reformation. New York: Henry Holt and Company.
- Smith, Henry Preserved (1914). The Life and Letters of Martin Luther. Houghton Mifflin company.
