= Protection (disambiguation) =

Protection is any measure taken to guard a thing against damage caused by outside forces.

Protection, protected, protective, or protect may also refer to:

== Places ==
- Protection, Georgia, an unincorporated area
- Protection, Kansas, a city
- Protection, New York, a hamlet
- Protection Mountain, a mountain in Alberta, Canada

== Arts, entertainment, and media ==
=== Films ===
- Protected (film), a 1975 documentary film
- Protection (1929 film), a 1929 film
- Protection (2000 film), a 2000 film directed by Bruce Spangler
- Protection (2001 film), a 2001 film directed by John Flynn

=== Television ===
- Protection (TV series), a 2024 British crime drama

=== Music ===
==== Albums ====
- Protection (Face to Face album) or the title song, 2016
- Protection (Massive Attack album) or the title song (see below), 1994
- Protect: A Benefit for the National Association to Protect Children, a 2005 punk album

==== Songs ====
- "Protection" (Donna Summer song), 1982
- "Protection" (Graham Parker song), 1979
- "Protection" (Massive Attack song), 1994
- "Protection" (Allday song), 2019
- "Protection", a 1977 song by Krokus from To You All
- "Protection", a 2014 song by Lucinda Williams from Down Where the Spirit Meets the Bone

== Other uses ==
- Protection racket
- Protect (political organization), an American political advocacy group, an American law
- Protect strategy, part of the CONTEST anti-terror strategy at the UK's Home Office
- Protected (computer programming), an access specifier in many object-oriented programming languages
- Protection (poker), a poker bet with a strong but vulnerable hand
- Protection, a slang term for condoms
- Protectionism, an economic policy advocated to shield a sector in a country's economy from foreign competitors
- PROTECT Act of 2003, U.S. law to prevent child abuse and violent crimes against children
- Protective Life, an American financial services company
  - Protective Stadium, a sports venue under construction in Birmingham, Alabama sponsored by the above company

== See also ==
- Defense (disambiguation)
- Preservation (disambiguation)
- Preserve (disambiguation)
- Project (disambiguation)
- Protector (disambiguation)
- Safety, condition of being protected from harm
- Security, freedom from or resilience against potential harm
