= NDA =

NDA, nda, or Nda may refer to:

== Military ==
- National Defence Academy (disambiguation)
- National Defence Act, the primary law establishing the Canadian Armed Forces
- National Defense Area, a military installation at the Mexico–United States border operated by the U.S. Government
- Naval Defence Act (disambiguation)
- Niger Delta Avengers, a militant group in Nigeria's Niger Delta
- Nigerian Defence Academy, a military academy in Nigeria
- National Defence Academy (India), an armed forces training academy in India
- Northern Domestic Airspace, a Canadian aviation organization

== Politics ==
- National Data Administration, a Chinese central government agency
- National Democratic Alliance (disambiguation)
- National Democratic Assembly, the English name of the Israeli political party Balad

== Other organizations ==
- National Dance Alliance, a sister company of the National Cheer Association
- National Dance Association, a defunct association of the American Alliance for Health, Physical Education, Recreation and Dance
- National Dental Association, an association for African-American dentists
- Net Daemons Associates, a computer network and systems administration company
- New Dutch Academy, an orchestra in The Hague, Netherlands
- National Disability Authority, an agency of the Irish Department of Children, Disability and Equality
- Nuclear Decommissioning Authority, an entity of the UK government
- Notre Dame Academy (disambiguation)

== Music ==
- "NDA" (song), a 2021 song by Billie Eilish
- "NDA", a song by Megan Thee Stallion from the album Traumazine, 2022
- NDA, a 2026 album by Trippie Redd

== Other uses ==
- Non-disclosure agreement, a contractual agreement not to disclose specified information
- National Design Awards, by the American National Design Museum
- New Drug Application, to the U.S. Food and Drug Administration
- Non-destructive analysis, to evaluate a material's properties
- Najran Domestic Airport, Saudi Arabia
- Nicolas Dupont-Aignan, a French politician
- Ndasa language (ISO 639-3 code: nda)

== See also ==
- N'Da, a surname
