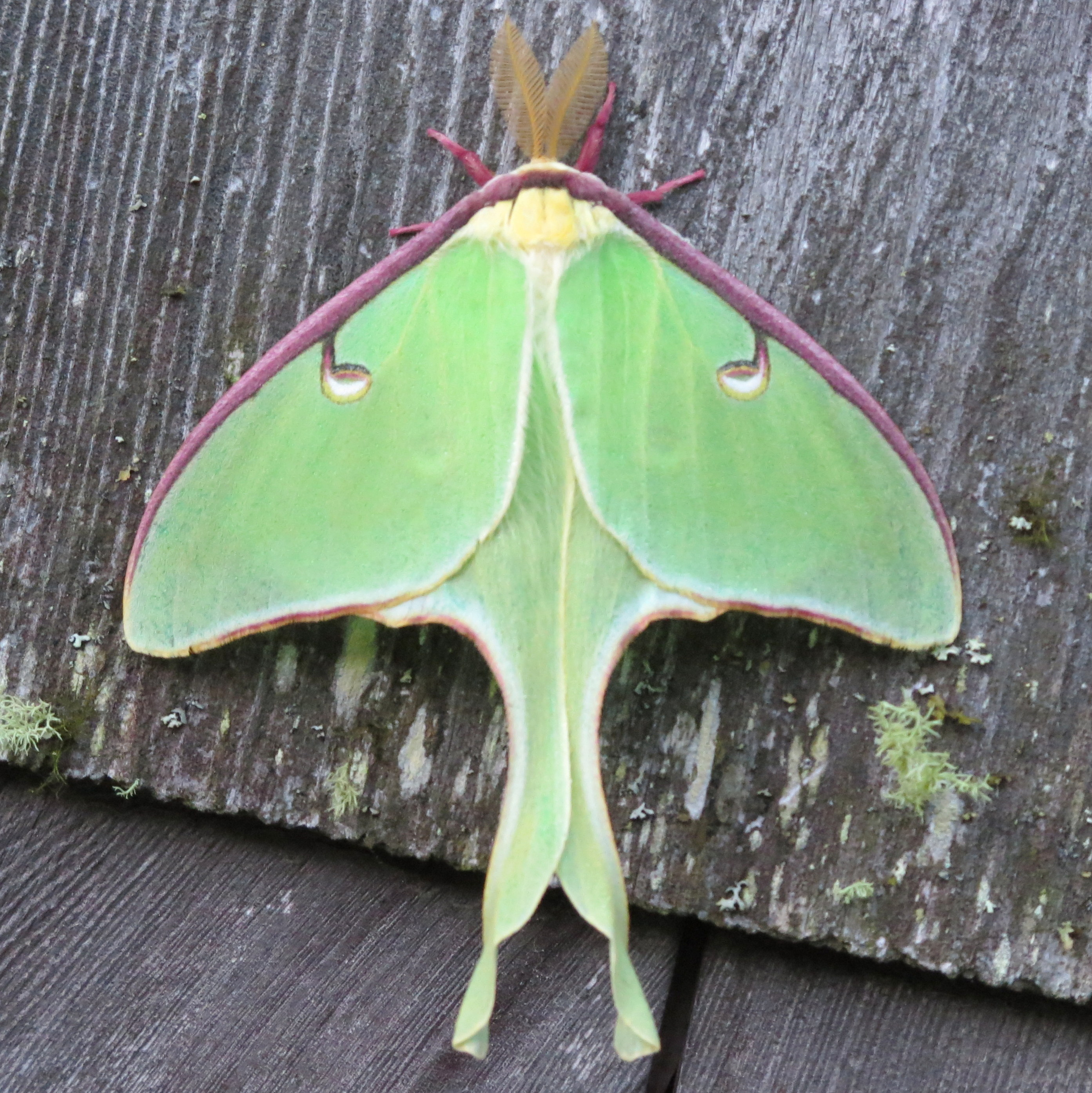
- Male
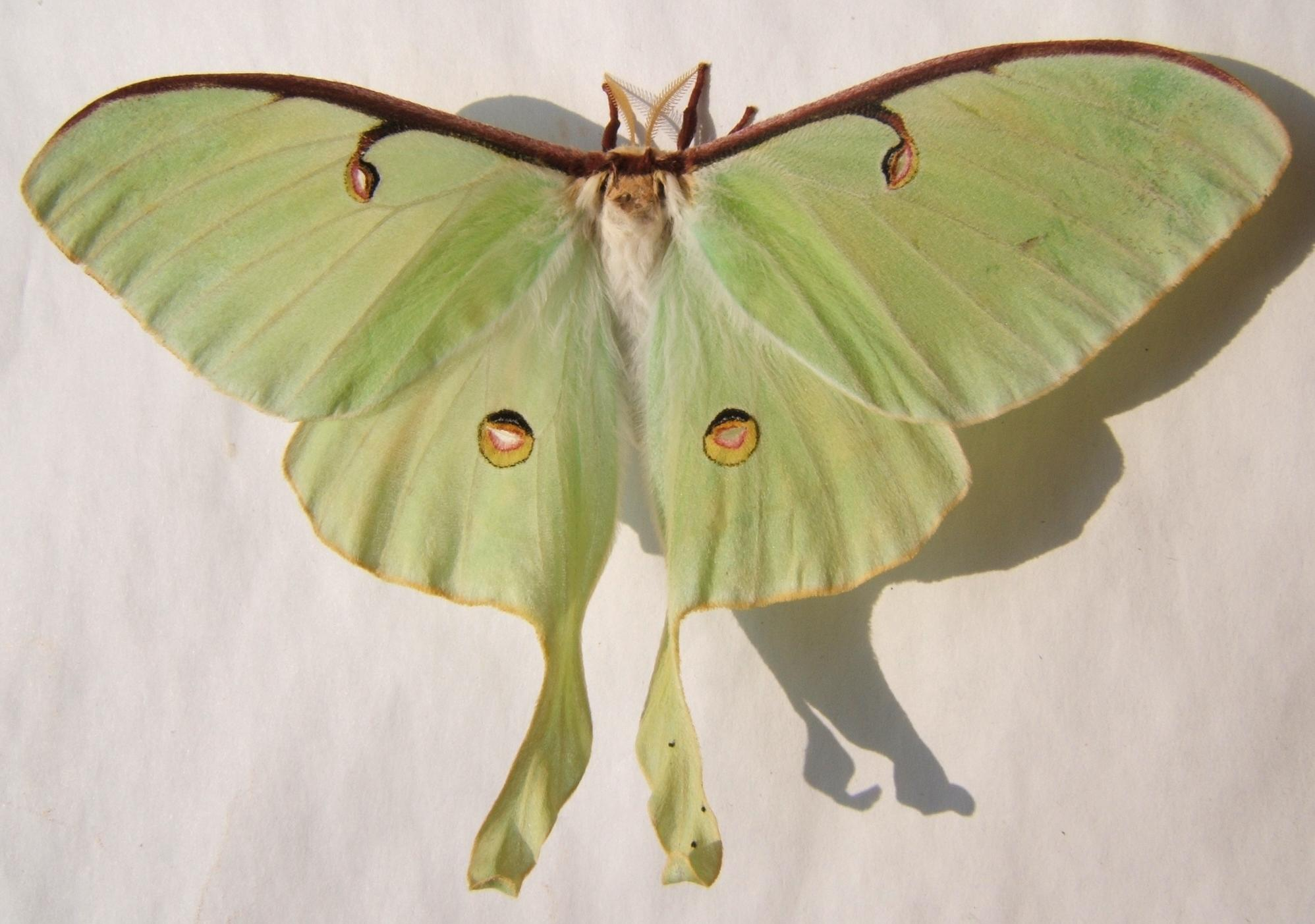
- Female

Conservation status
- Secure (NatureServe)

Scientific classification
- Kingdom: Animalia
- Phylum: Arthropoda
- Clade: Pancrustacea
- Class: Insecta
- Order: Lepidoptera
- Family: Saturniidae
- Genus: Actias
- Species: A. luna

Binomial name
- Actias luna (Linnaeus, 1758)

= Luna moth =

Species of insect

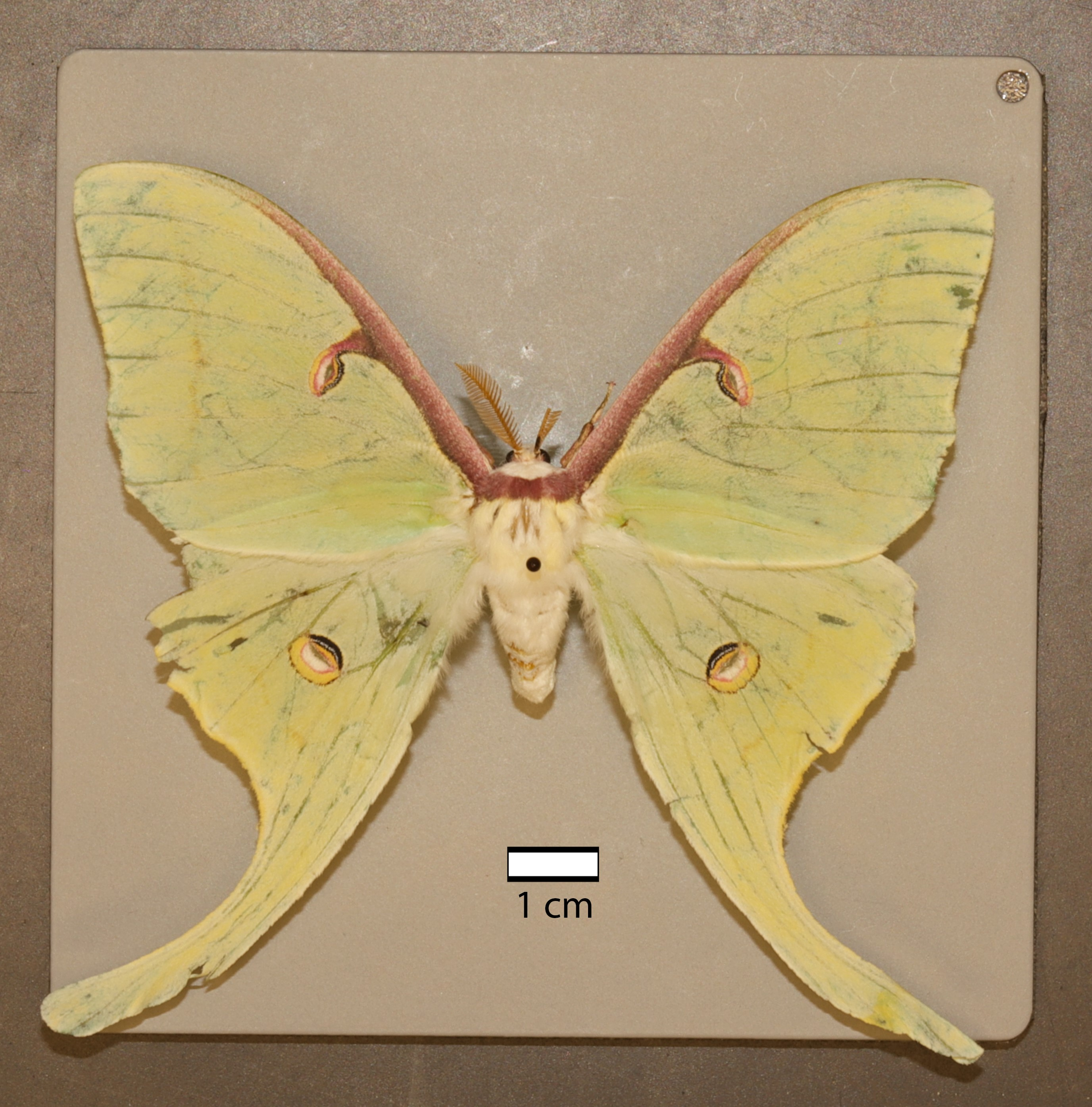
Mounted specimen

The luna moth (Actias luna), also called the American moon moth, is a Nearctic moth in the family Saturniidae, subfamily Saturniinae, a group commonly named the giant silk moths.

The moth has lime-green wings and a white body. Its caterpillars are also green. Its typical wingspan is roughly 114 mm (4.5 in), but wingspans can exceed 178 mm (7.0 in), ranking the species as one of the larger moths found in North America.

Across Canada, it has one generation per year, with the winged adults appearing in late May or early June, whereas farther south it will have two or even three generations per year, the first appearance as early as March in southern parts of the United States.

As defense mechanisms, larvae emit clicks as a warning and can also regurgitate intestinal contents, confirmed as having a deterrent effect on a variety of predators. The elongated tails of the hindwings are thought to confuse the echolocation detection used by predatory bats.

A parasitoid fly deliberately introduced to North America as a biological pest control for the invasive species spongy moth (also known as gypsy moth) appears to have had a negative impact on luna moths and other native moths.

== Description ==
Eggs, attached in small groups to undersides of leaves, are mottled white and brown, slightly oval, and roughly 1.5 millimeters in diameter. Larvae are primarily green, with sparse hairs. The first instar, emerging from the egg, reaches a length of 6–8 mm (0.24–0.31 in), the second 9–10 mm (0.35–0.39 in), the third 12–16 mm (0.47–0.63 in) and the fourth 23–26 mm (0.91–1.02 in). The fifth (final) instar grows to approximately 70–90 mm (2.8–3.5 in) in length. Small, colorful dots – yellow or magenta – may line the sides of the fourth and fifth instars. The larvae may take on a reddish-brown color just prior to cocooning. Fifth-instar larvae descend to the ground and use silk to bind dead leaves around the cocoon.

The imagoes (winged, sexually mature), often referred to as adult moths, emerge from the pupae with the wings small, crumpled and held close to the body. Over several hours the wings will enlarge to full size. Wingspan is typically 8–11.5 cm (3.1–4.5 in), and in rare instances as much as 17.78 cm (7.00 in). Females and males are similar in size and appearance: green wings, eyespots on both forewings and hind wings, and long, sometimes somewhat twisted tails extending from the back edge of the hindwings. Bodies are white and hairy. Adults have vestigial mouthparts and do not feed. All energy required for reproduction is released from fat stores from the caterpillar. The forward edge of the forewing is dark-colored and thick, tapering in thickness from the thorax to the wing tip. Its color can range from maroon to brown. The eyespots, one per wing, are oval in shape on the forewings and round on the hindwings. Each eyespot can have arcs of black, blue, red, yellow, green or white. The eyespots are thought to confuse potential predators.

There are some sex-determined and regional differences in appearance. Females will have a larger abdomen compared to males because it contains 200–400 eggs. Both sexes have antennae, but the male's are much longer and wider. Wing color is blue-green in the north and for the overwintering generation in the central and southern states; second and third generation wing color has more of a yellow-green tint.

== Etymology ==
Described and named Phalena plumata caudata by James Petiver in 1700, this was the first North American saturniid to be reported in the insect literature. The initial Latin name, which roughly translates to "brilliant feather tail", was replaced when Carl Linnaeus described the species in 1758 in the tenth edition of Systema Naturae, and renamed it Phalaena luna, later Actias luna, with luna derived from Luna, the Roman moon goddess. The common name became "Luna moth". Several other North American giant silk moths were also given species names after Roman or Greek mythology.

== Distribution ==
The Luna moth is found in North America, from east of the Great Plains in the United States – Florida to Maine, and from Saskatchewan eastward through central Quebec to Nova Scotia in Canada. Luna moths are also rarely found in Western Europe as vagrants.

== Life cycle ==
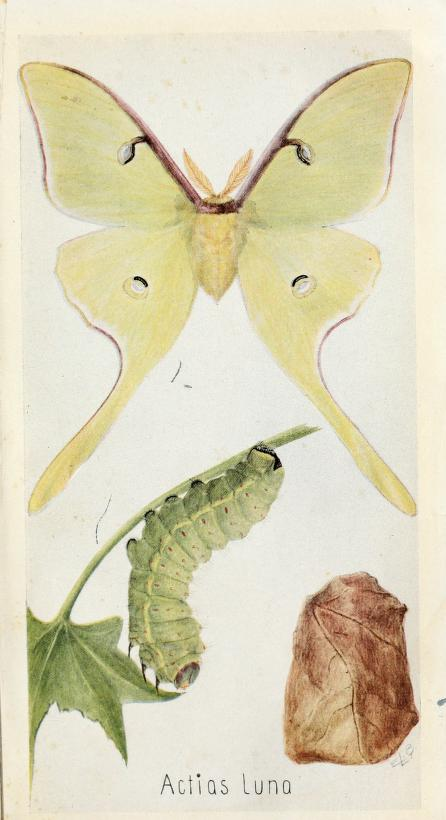
Illustration by Edna Libby Beutenmuller from Field Book of Insects (1918)

Based on the climate in which they live, Luna moths produce different numbers of generations per year. In Canada and northern regions of the United States, they are univoltine, meaning one generation per year. Life stages are approximately 10 days as eggs, 6–7 weeks as larvae, 2–3 weeks as pupae, finishing with one week as winged adults appearing in late May or early June. In the mid-Atlantic states, the species is bivoltine, characterized by two generations per year. In contrast, farther south, they are trivoltine, producing three generations within the same time frame. In the central states, the first generation appears in April, the second in July. Even farther south, the first generation appears as early as March, with the second and third spaced eight to ten weeks later.

=== Eggs ===
Females lay 200–400 eggs, singly or in small groups, on the underside of leaves of the tree species preferred by the larvae. Egg laying starts the evening after mating is completed and goes on for several days. Eggs hatch in about a week.

=== Larvae ===
Each instar – the period between molts – generally takes about 4–10 days. There are five instars before cocooning. At the end of each instar, a small amount of silk is placed on the major vein of a leaf and the larva undergoes apolysis, then ecdysis (molting), leaving the old exoskeleton behind. Sometimes the shed exoskeleton is eaten. Newly hatched, this caterpillar constantly munches on the leaves of walnut, hickory, sweetgum, and paper birch trees. Each instar is green, though the first two instars do have some variation in which some larvae will have black underlying splotches on their dorsal side. The final instar grows to approximately 70 to 90 mm (2.8 to 3.5 in) in length. All five instar stages possess green spines on the dorsal surface. These spines do not sting, but can still cause irritation upon contact. This is a tree-dwelling species. Larvae stay on the same tree where they hatched until it is time to descend to the ground to make a cocoon. When females emerge from cocoons, they fly to preferred tree species, emit pheromones, and wait there for males to find them. Although some larvae in the family Saturniidae are known to be poisonous, those of A. luna are not. The spines, or setae, located on the thoracic and abdominal segments have no chemical component to them.

=== Pupae ===
The Luna moth pupates after spinning a silk cocoon, which is thin and single layered. Shortly before pupation, the final, fifth-instar caterpillar will engage in a "gut dump" where any excess water and intestinal contents are expelled. As pupae, this species is more physically active than most moths. When disturbed, the moths will wiggle within their pupal cases, producing a noise. Pupation takes approximately two weeks unless the individual is in diapause over winter, in which case the pupal stage takes about nine months. The mechanisms triggering diapause are generally a mixture of genetic triggers, duration of sunlight and temperature. The pupae have chitinous spurs near the base of the forewings. By vigorously moving about within the cocoon, these spurs tear a circular opening from which the imago emerges, the silk of the cocoon having also been weakened by the secretion of cocoonase, a protein-digesting enzyme.

=== Imago (winged) ===
Pupae transition to winged state after receiving external signals in the form of temperature change. When the adult Luna moths emerge from their pupae, their abdomens are swollen and their wings are small, soft and wet. The first few hours of adult life will be spent pumping hemolymph (invertebrates' equivalent to blood) from the abdomen into the wings. The moths must wait for the wings to dry and harden before being able to fly. This process can take 2–3 hours to complete. Luna moths are not rare, but are rarely seen due to their very brief (7–10 day) adult lives and nocturnal flying time. As with all giant silk moths, the adults only have vestigial mouthparts and no digestive system and therefore do not eat in their adult form. Instead, they rely on energy stored during their caterpillar stage. In regions where there are two or three generations per year, the second and third may have wing coloration that is more of a yellow-green compared to the first generation of the year.

=== Mating ===
Giant silk moths have in common a mating process wherein the females, at night, release volatile sex pheromones, which the males, flying, detect via their large antennae. Males can detect these molecules at a distance of several miles, and then fly in the direction the wind is coming from until reaching the female. Luna moth females mate with the first males to find them, a process that typically starts after midnight and takes several hours. Researchers extracted three chemical compounds from the pheromone gland of unmated Luna moth females and identified one major and two minor aldehyde compounds designated E6,Z11-18:Ald, E6-18:Ald and Z11-18:Ald. The same compounds were also synthesized. Field experiments with both unmated females and the synthesized compounds confirmed that E6, Z11-18:Ald was the major sex pheromone, attraction augmented by the addition of E6-18:Ald but not by Z11-18:Ald. The authors mentioned that no other moth species were attracted to either the unmated females or the synthesized products, confirming that the pheromone is species-specific, at least for the sites and dates where it was tested.

=== Gallery of life cycle ===
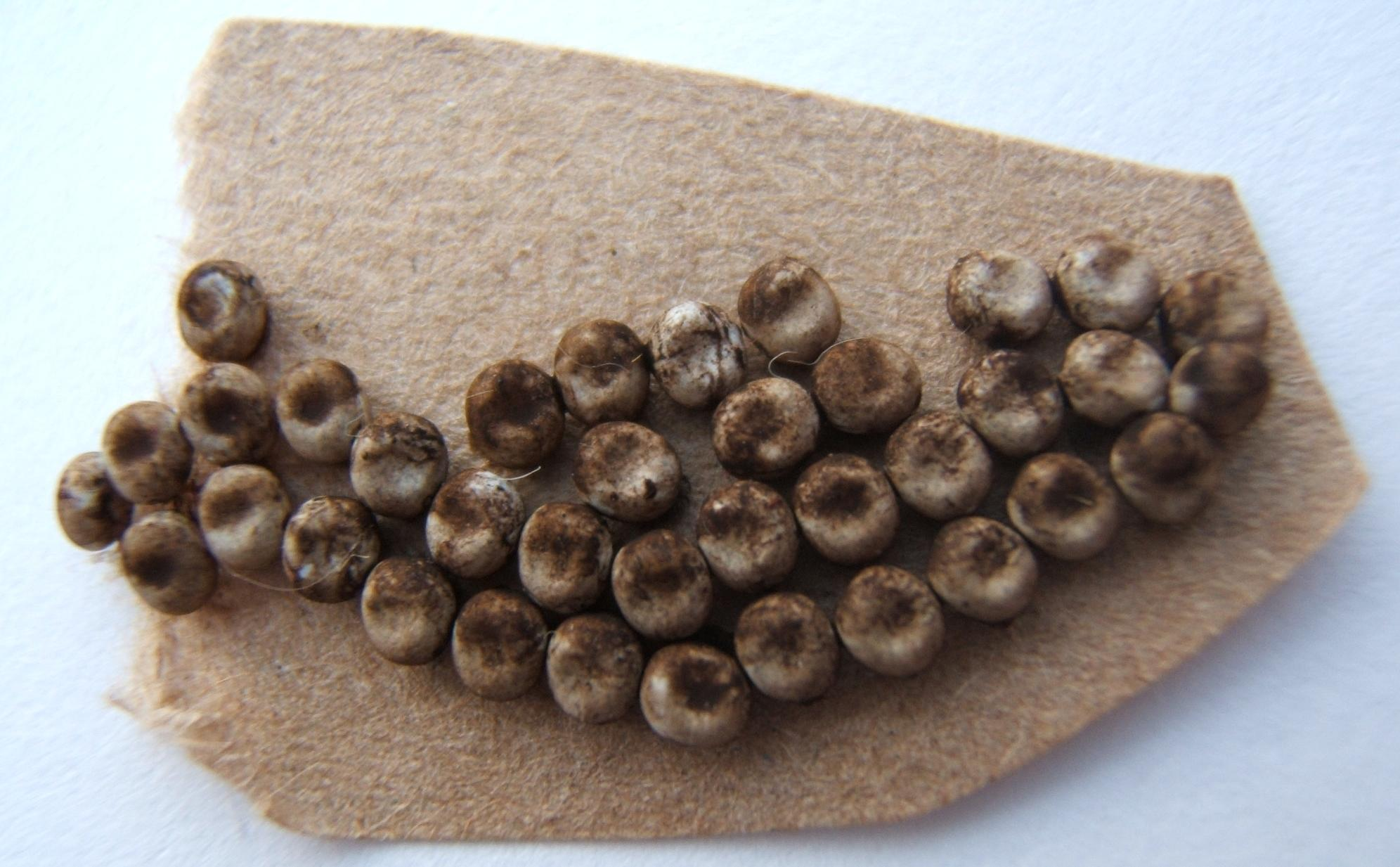
Eggs from female raised in captivity, laid on coarse paper

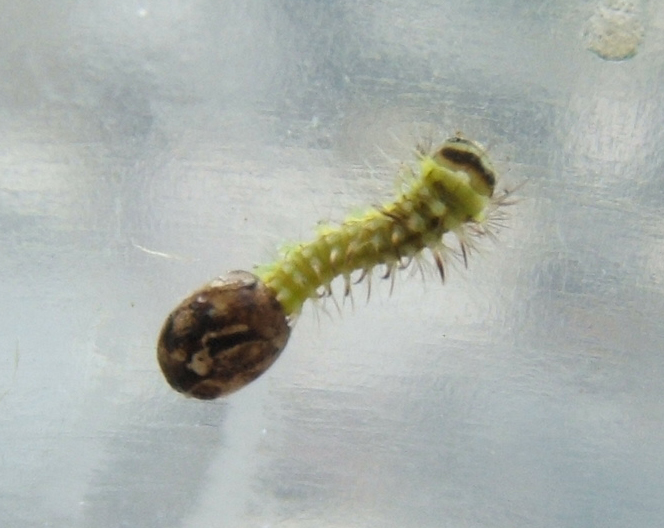
Hatching larva

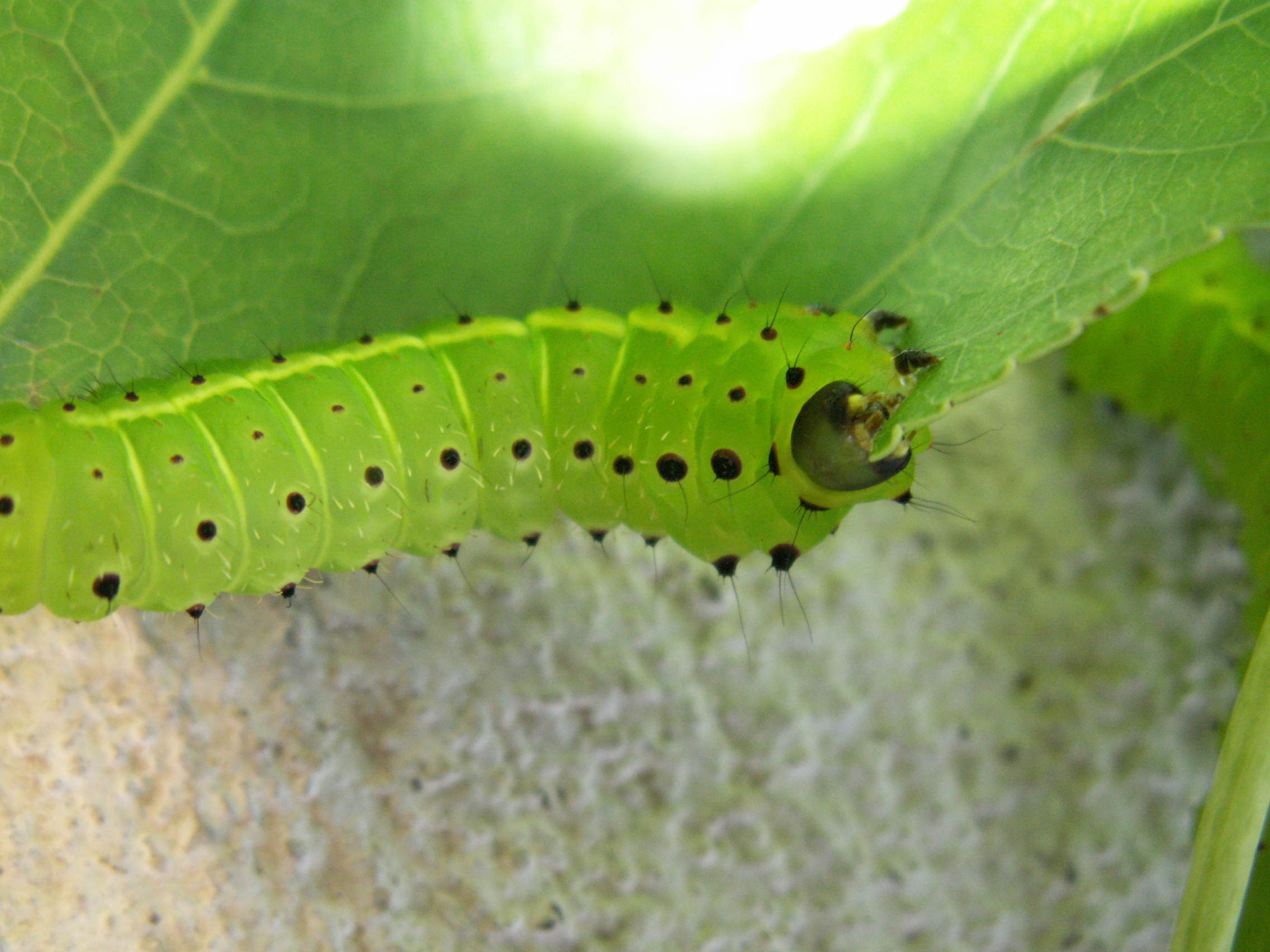
4th-instar larva. Spots can also be yellow or magenta.

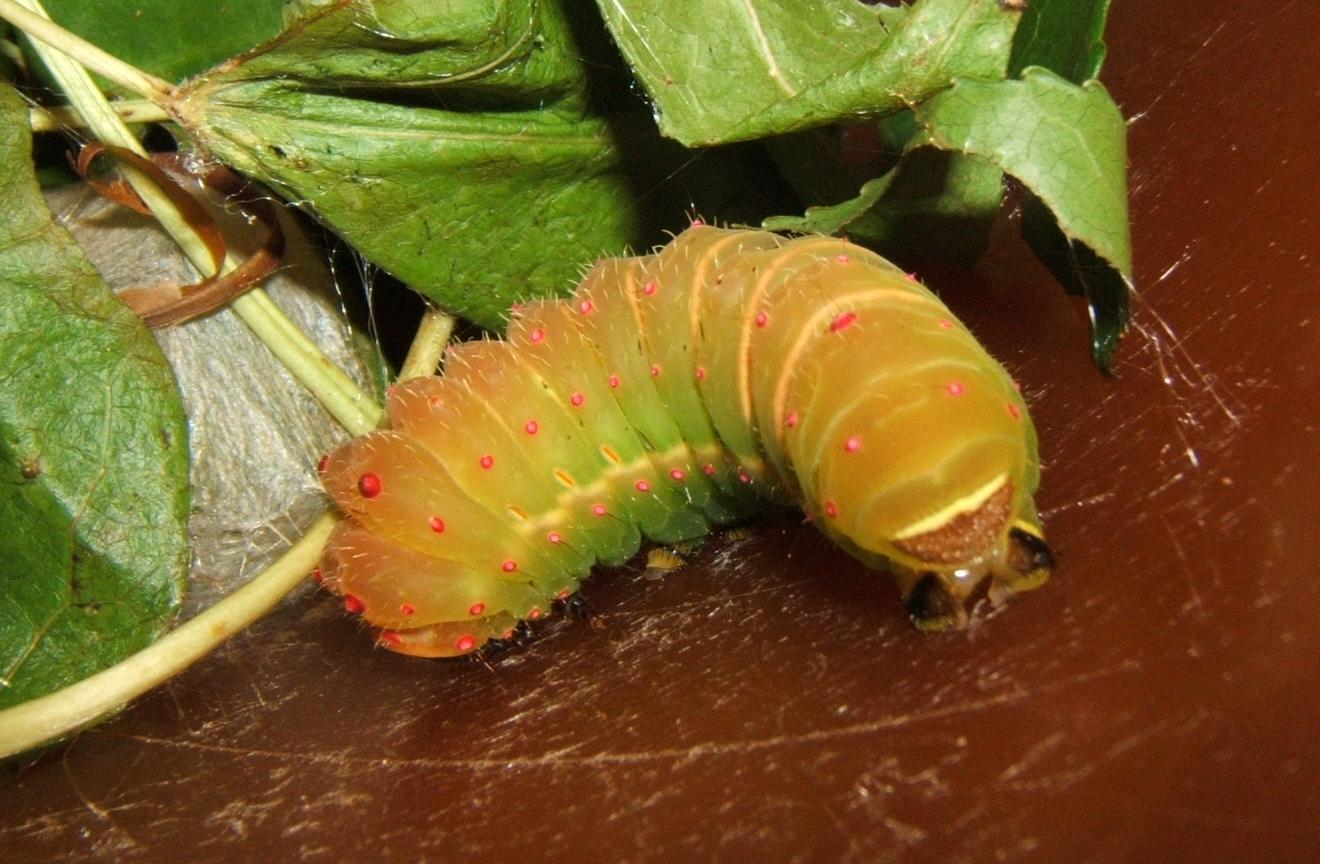
5th-instar larva starting to create a cocoon (note silk strands to leaves)

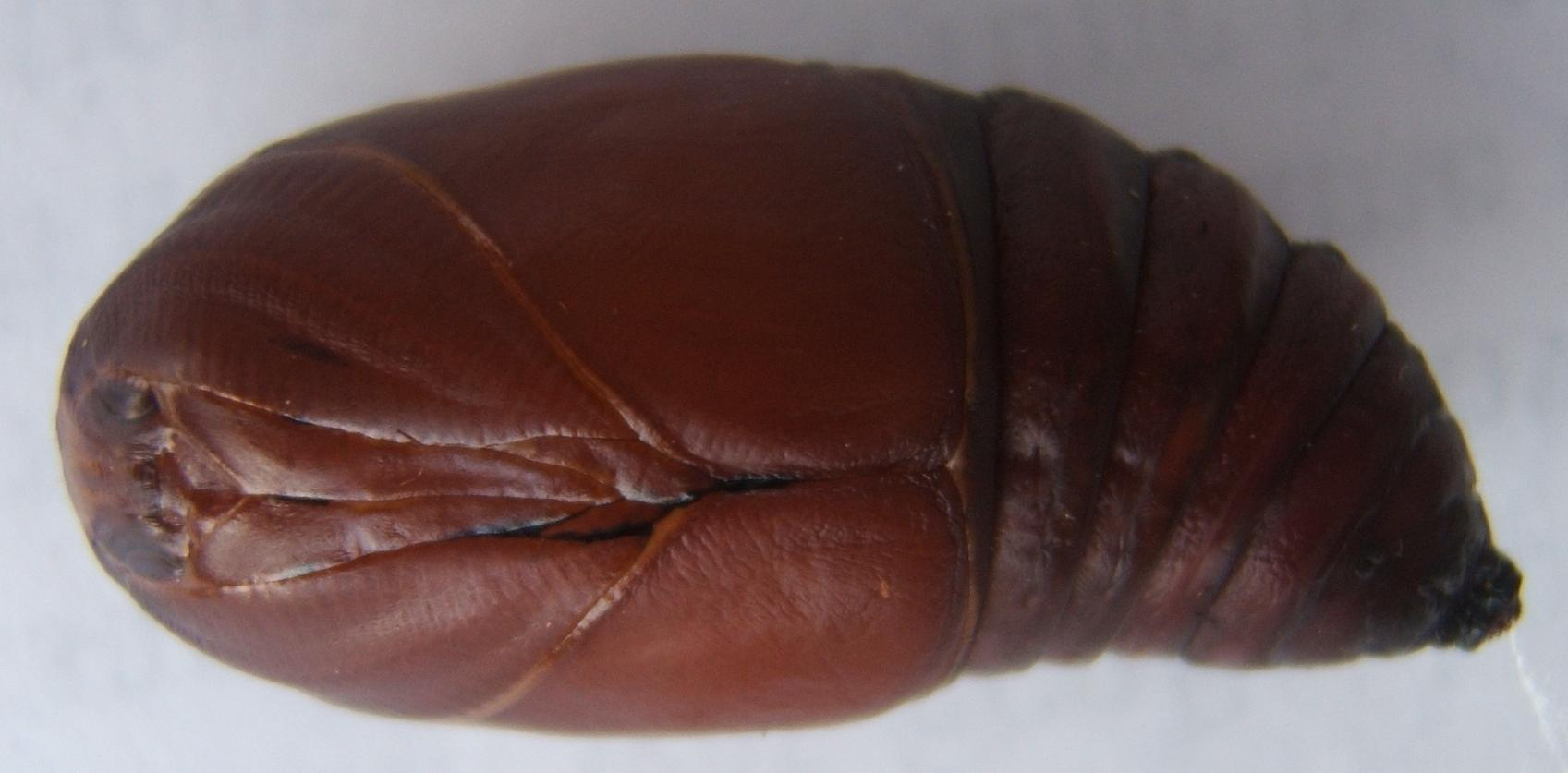
Pupa, removed from cocoon. Eyes visible at head end (left)

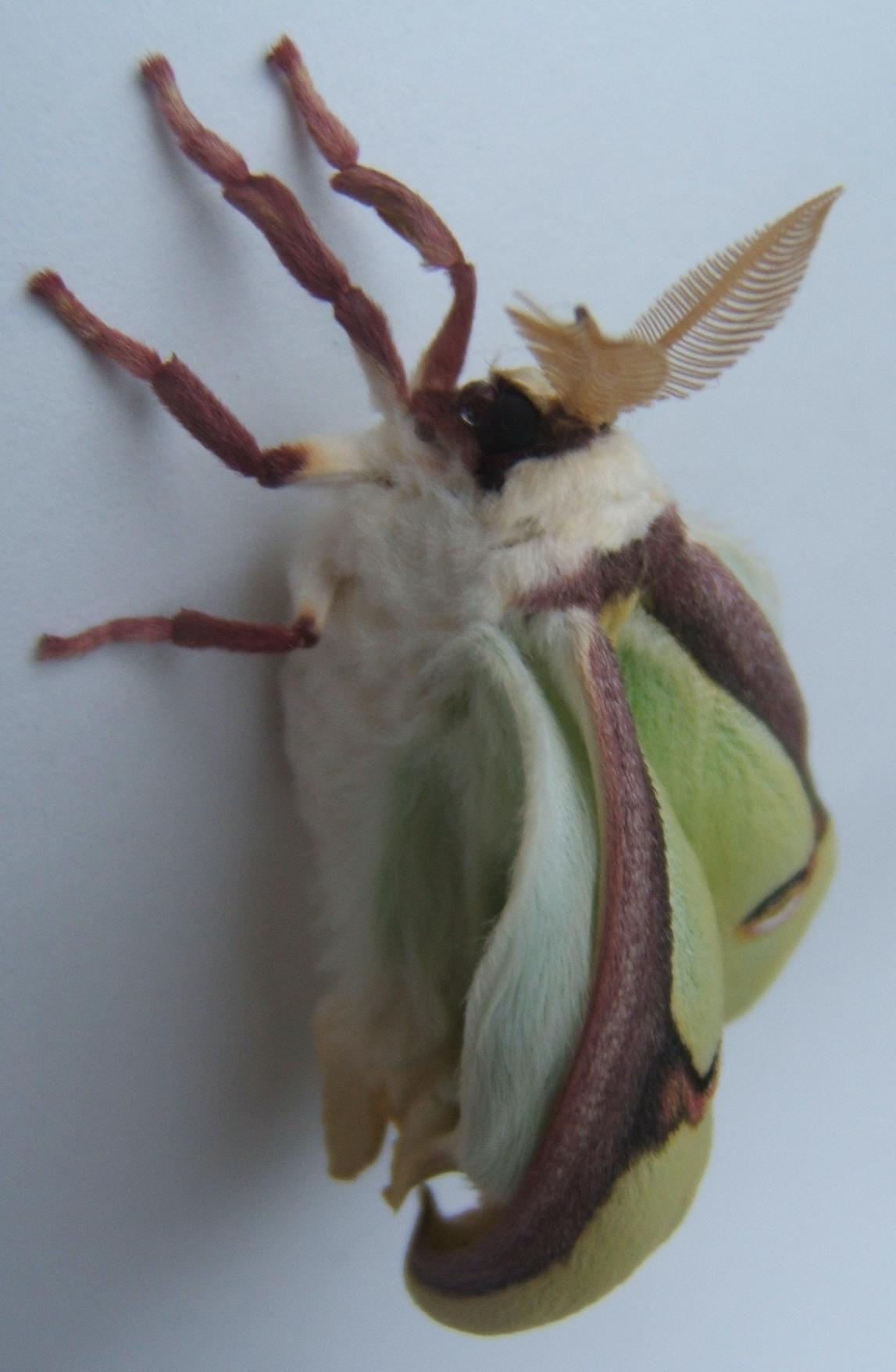
Wings drying and enlarging after emergence from pupa

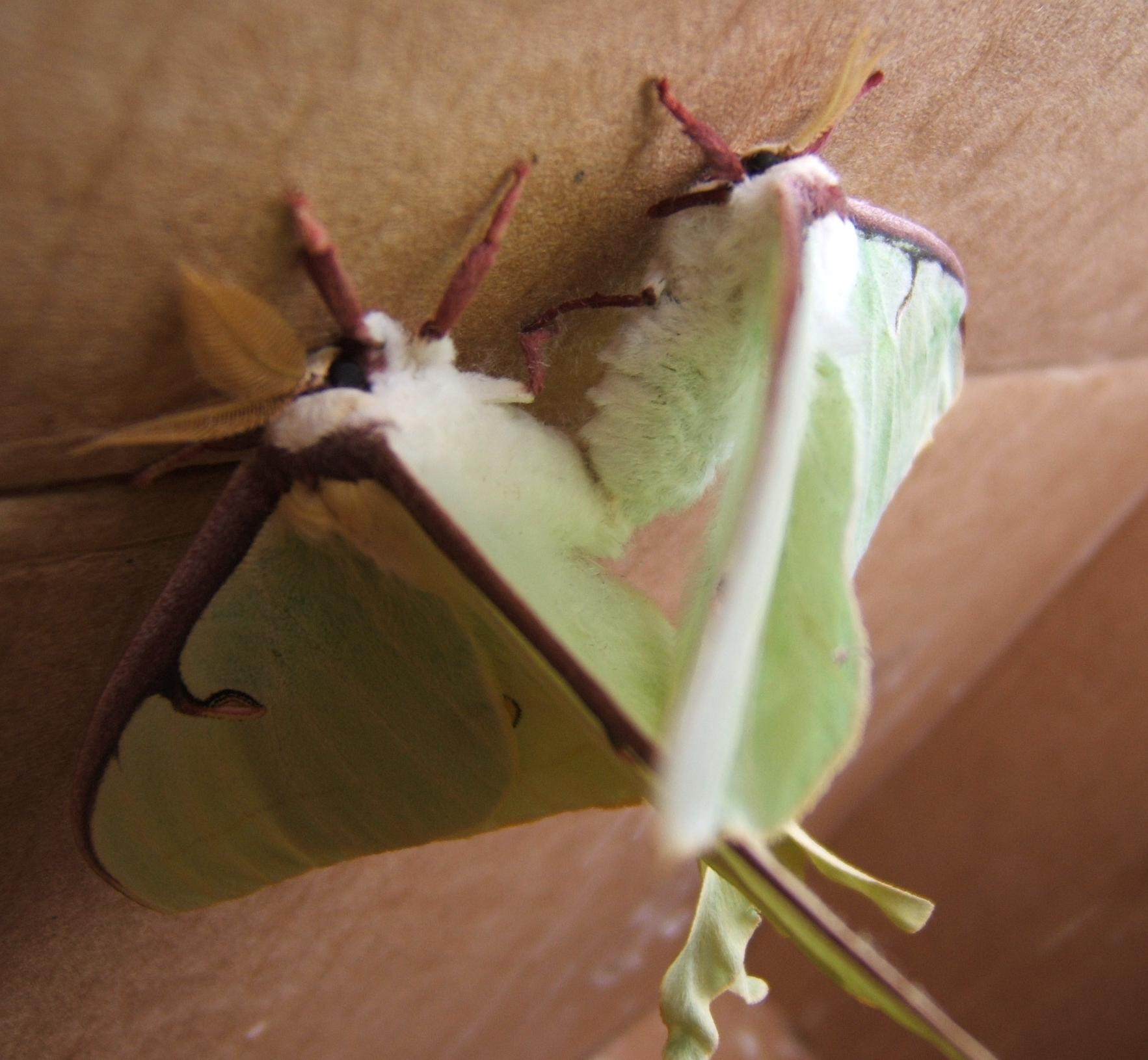
Mating imagoes (winged adults). Male, with larger antennae, on left

=== Close-up images ===
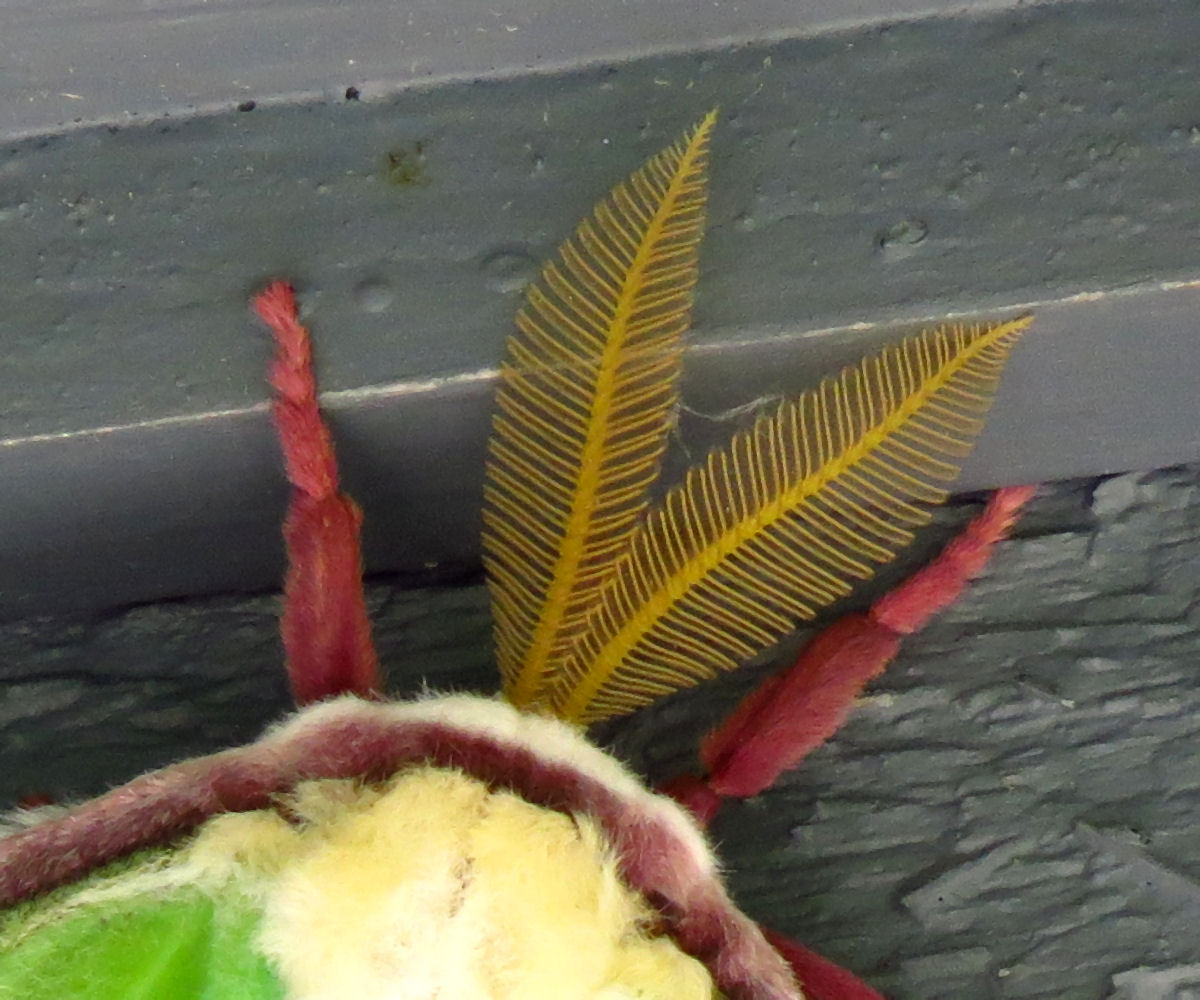
Antennae (male)

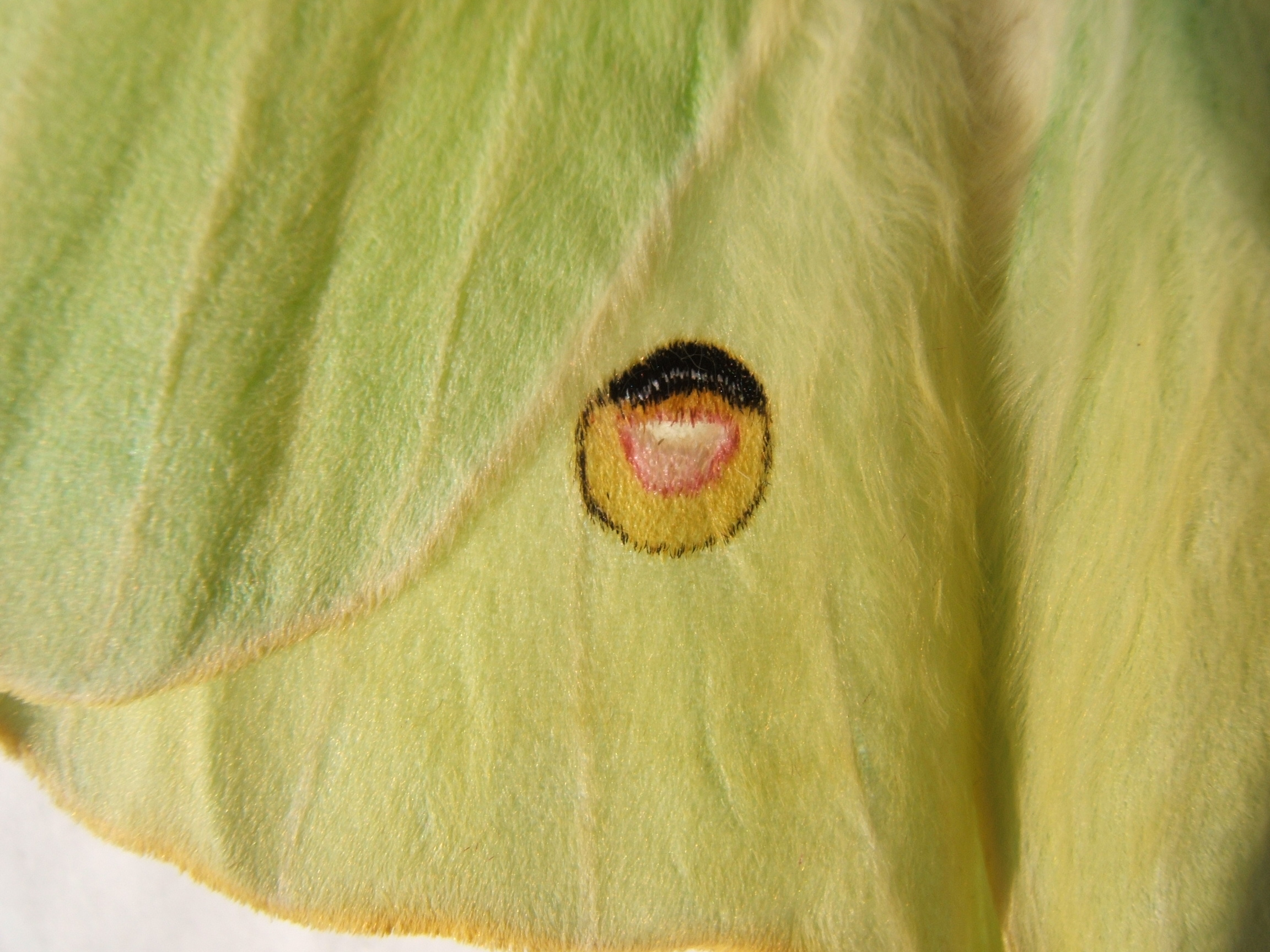
Eye-spot on hindwing

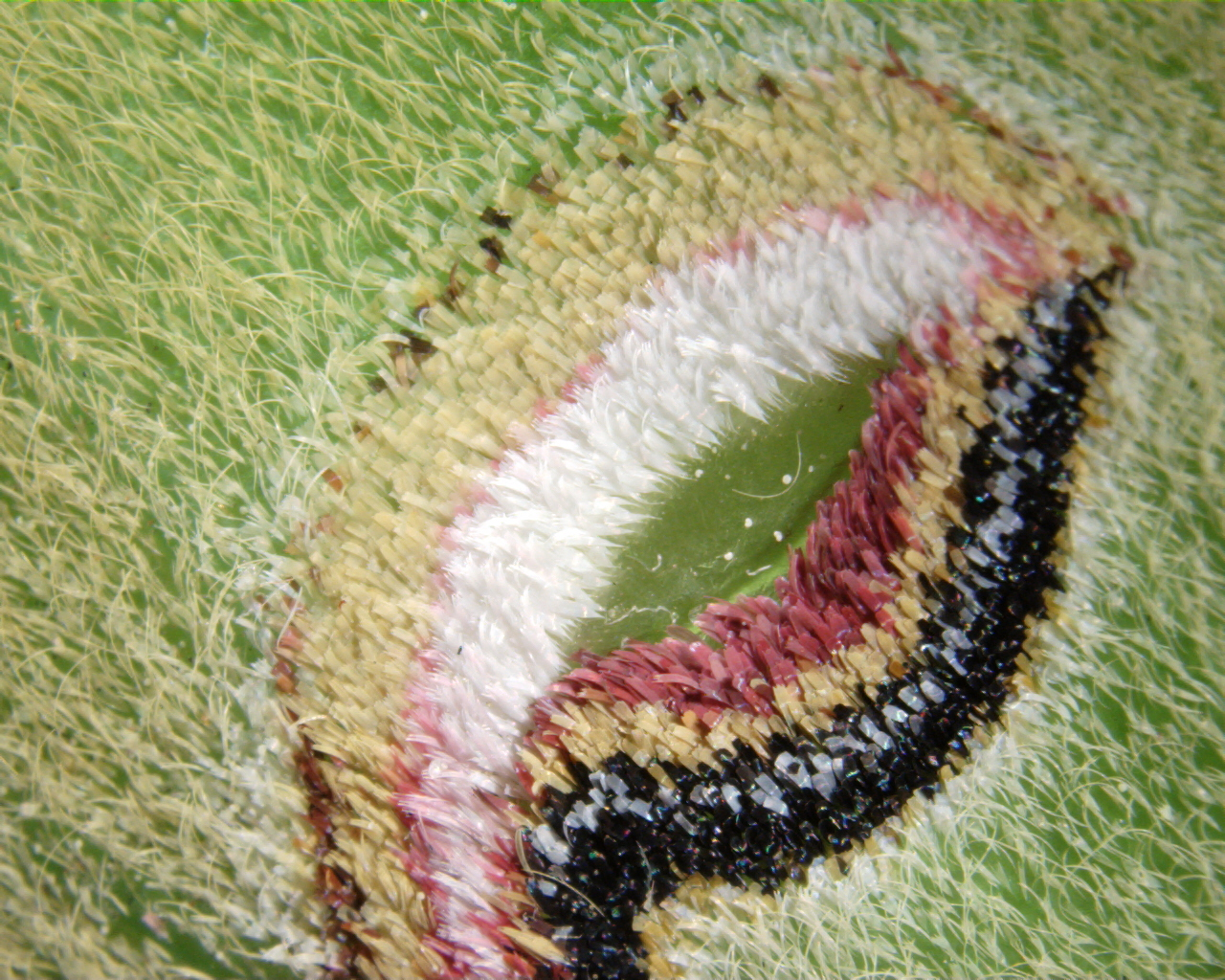
Eye-spot on forewing

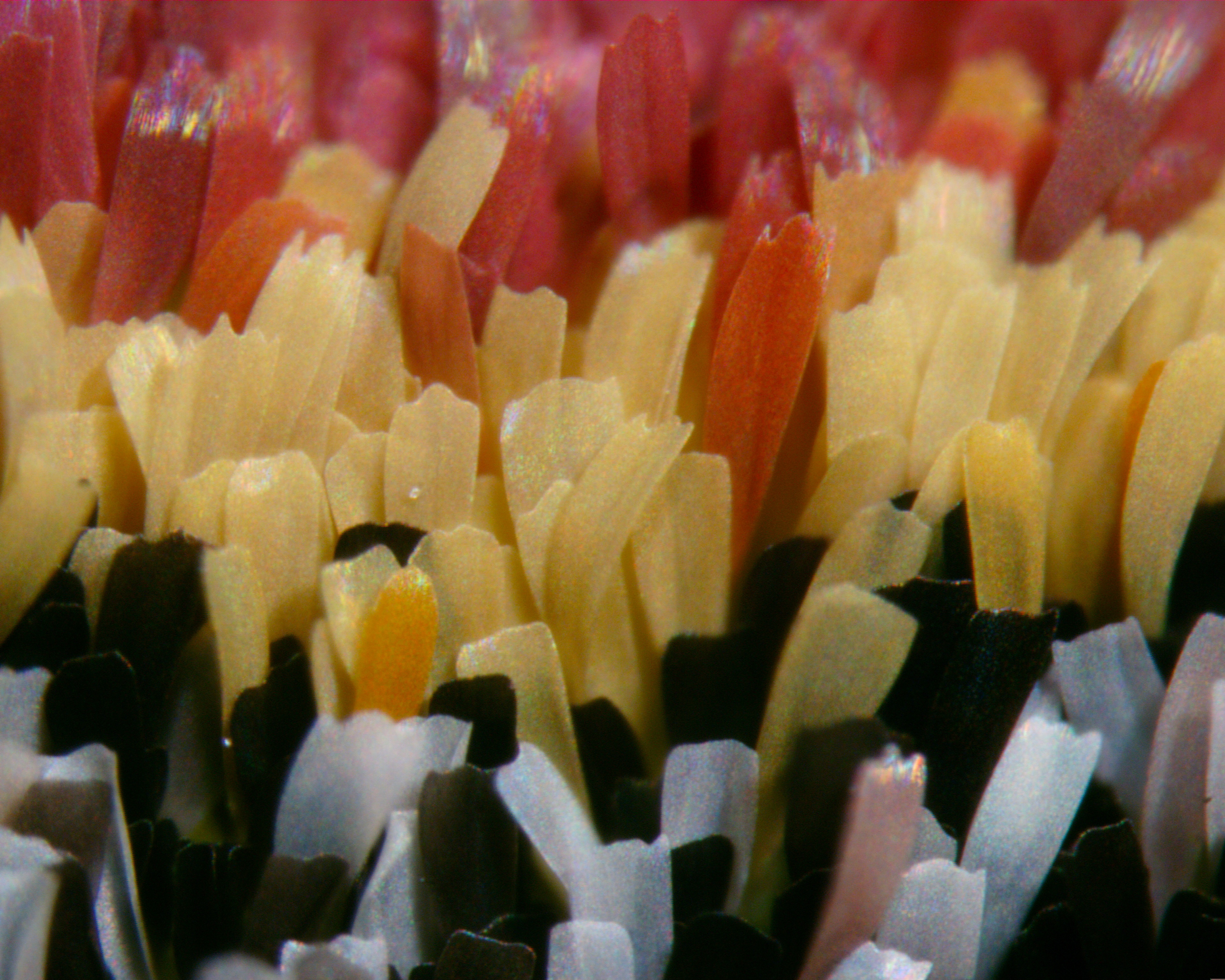
Extreme close-up of scales in eye-spot

== Predators and parasites ==
Some species of giant silk moth larvae are known to make clicking noises when attacked by rubbing their serrated mandibles together and can release a regurgitation of distasteful fluids. These clicks are audible to humans and extend into ultrasound frequencies audible to predators. Clicks are thought to be a form of aposematic warning signaling, made prior to predator-deterring regurgitation of intestinal contents. Luna moth larvae click and regurgitate, with the regurgitated material confirmed as being a predator deterrent against several species.

Imagos (winged adults) of this and related night-flying Actias species, collectively referred to as "moon moths", have long hindwing tails. A "false target" hypothesis holds that the tails evolved to reduce predation risk by bats which use echolocation to locate prey. The moths use the spinning hindwing tails to fool bats into attacking nonessential appendages, with success occurring over 55% of the time. Experiments were conducted with Luna moths with intact wings and with the tails removed. With intact wings, a majority of the attacking bats contacted the hindwing tails rather than the body of the moth; only 35% of intact moths were caught versus 81% for those with clipped tails. The results of this experiment support echolocation distortion as an effective countermeasure.

The parasitoid tachinid fly Compsilura concinnata native to Europe was deliberately introduced to the United States throughout much of the 20th century as a biological control for the gypsy moth (Lymantria dispar) (also known as the "spongy moth"). Researchers reported that when Luna moth larvae were placed outside for about a week and then collected and returned to the laboratory, four parasitic species emerged, the most common being C. concinnata. The researchers concluded that this parasitoid fly causes collateral damage to Luna moth populations.

Luna moth larvae have displayed defenses against predators in late instars by developing spines once they reach about 3 cm in length. Unlike other species such as Automeris io, which have chemical defenses much earlier in the larval stage, the Luna moth larvae are left largely defenseless until it reaches this length. However, the absence of a chemical defense allows for the shortening of the larval stage. Automeris io has a larval stage at least twice as long on average as Actias luna, leaving it vulnerable to parasitism.

== Host plants ==
The larvae of Luna moths feed on several different species of broadleaf trees. The larvae do not reach population densities sufficient to cause significant damage to their host trees. Tuskes listed white birch (Betula papyrifera), American persimmon (Diospyros virginiana), American sweet gum (Liquidambar styraciflua), plus several species of hickory (Carya), walnut (Juglans) and sumac (Rhus) as host plants for the caterpillars. Other tree species have been identified as suitable for Actias luna larvae, but a feeding experiment that also included black cherry, eastern cottonwood, quaking aspen, white willow, red oak, white oak and tulip tree reported very poor survival on these seven tree species even though older literature had identified them as hosts. The author suggested that host plant utilization may differ regionally, so that larvae collected from one region may not tolerate host plants readily consumed in another region (northern populations often lose the ability to digest sweetgum, while southern ones may undergo the same with willows). Biochemical detoxification of host plant defensive chemicals by digestive system enzymes may be a factor in regional host plant specialization. Juglone is a chemical compound common to walnut and hickory which most insects find a deterrent or even toxic. Luna moth larvae have higher concentrations of juglone-neutralizing digestive system enzymes compared to other lepidoptera, and concentrations were even higher when larvae were fed walnut or hickory leaves versus white birch or American sweet gum. This suggests evolutionary and inducible adaptations to allow consumption of certain host plants.

== In popular culture ==
The Luna moth appeared on a first class United States postage stamp issued in June 1987. Although more than two dozen butterflies have been so honored, as of 2019 this is the only moth.

A boss from the 2011 video-game Dark Souls, Moonlight Butterfly, has a strong resemblance to this moth.

In 2025, the Luna moth was designated on a Non-Machineable Surcharge United States postage stamp.
