= Naval Defence Act =

Naval Defence Act may refer to:

- Colonial Naval Defence Act 1865
- Australasian Naval Defence Act, 1887, establishing the Australian Squadron
- Naval Defence Act 1889, an act of Parliament in the UK
- Naval Defence Act 1910, an amendment to the Australian Defence Act 1903
- Naval Defence Act 1913, establishing the Royal New Zealand Navy

== See also ==
- NDA (disambiguation)
