= Table Bay =

Bay at the north of the Cape Peninsula in South Africa

- Tafelbaai (Afrikaans)
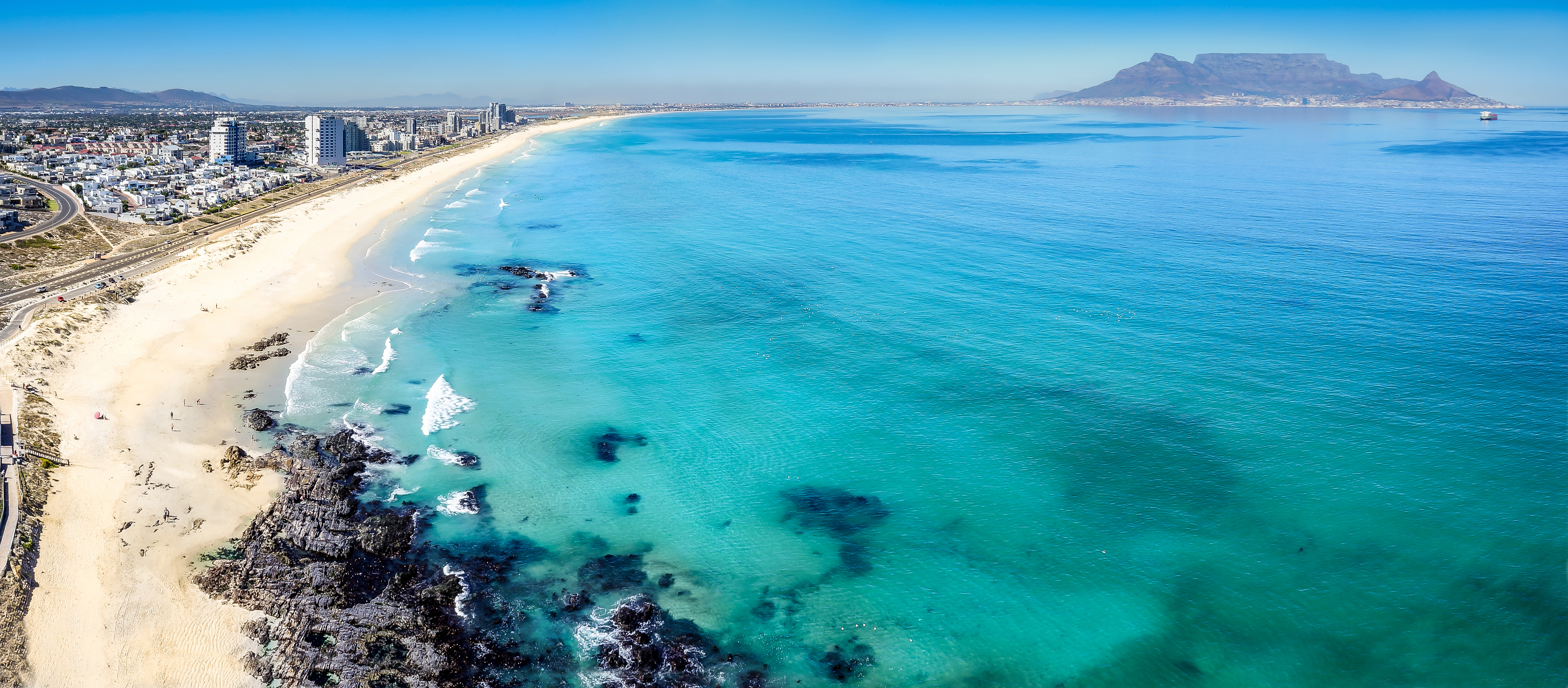
- An aerial view of Table Bay from Bloubergstrand, to the north of Cape Town. Table Mountain is visible in the distance on the far side of the bay.

- Location in South Africa
- Coordinates: 33°51′S 18°27′E
- Ocean/sea sources: Southern Atlantic Ocean
- Basin countries: South Africa
- Surface area: 100 square kilometres (39 sq mi)
- Islands: Robben Island
- Settlements: Cape Town

Table Bay (Afrikaans: Tafelbaai) is a natural bay on the Atlantic Ocean at the northern end of the Cape Peninsula, which stretches south to the Cape of Good Hope. Overlooked by Cape Town, the bay is dominated by the flat-topped Table Mountain, from which it takes its name.

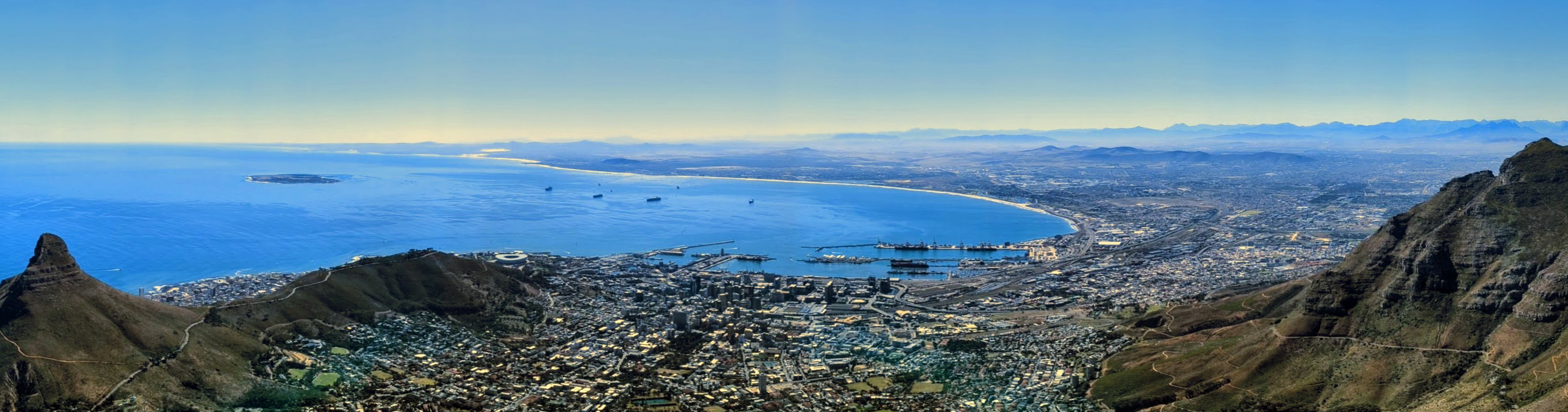
Table Bay, the harbour and the City Bowl from the summit of Table Mountain in 2022.

== History ==
=== Early European exploration ===
The first European to explore the region was Bartolomeu Dias, who rounded the Cape of Good Hope in 1488. The first European to anchor in the bay itself was Portuguese navigator António de Saldanha in 1503. Saldanha also made the first recorded ascent of Table Mountain. The bay was subsequently named Aguada de Saldanha ("Watering-place of Saldanha"). In 1601, Dutch navigator Joris van Spilbergen renamed it Table Bay.

Although famous for centuries as a haven for ships, the bay is a poor natural harbour, exposed to northwesterly storm waves. Many sailing ships seeking refuge in the bay during the 17th and 18th centuries were driven ashore by winter storms.

=== Dutch settlement and harbour construction ===
Despite the poor conditions, the Dutch colonists persisted with their settlement on the shores of Table Bay, as good natural harbours are scarce along this coastline. On 6 April 1652, Jan van Riebeeck established a refreshment station at the bay for the Dutch East India Company (VOC). The first fortification, a small fort named the Fort of Good Hope, was built on the shoreline. The settlement grew into the city of Cape Town.

Other nearby bays were considered. The best of these, Saldanha Bay, lacked fresh water. Simon's Bay, while well protected from westerly winter storms and swells, was more exposed to summer southeasterly storms and was difficult to access overland from Cape Town. Hout Bay was small and exposed to the prevailing southwesterly swell.

Eventually, a modern harbour was built in Table Bay by a process of land reclamation and protected from storm waves by breakwaters. Construction of the first breakwater began in 1860, with Prince Alfred ceremonially tipping the first load of rocks. This structure protected the Alfred Basin, the first part of the new harbour. The older part of this development is today called the Victoria & Alfred Waterfront. The newer, deeper part is the Duncan Dock. Robben Island, where Nelson Mandela was imprisoned for decades, is in this bay.

=== Sliedrecht oil spill ===
The bay's beaches were oiled following an accident involving the Dutch tanker Sliedrecht in November 1953. The vessel moved 96 km (60 mi) offshore to pump out 1,000 tonnes of oil that had been fouled with seawater after the initial impact.

== Geography ==
=== Robben Island ===
Robben Island is located in Table Bay. Geologically, it is underlain by the Tygerberg Formation, which is part of the Neoproterozoic to early Cambrian Malmesbury Group of the Saldania Belt.

=== Bathymetry ===
Table Bay is a relatively shallow body of water, covering an area of approximately 100 km². It slopes gently from east to west, reaching a maximum depth of 35 m at the centre of its mouth.

The bedrock is shales, slates and sandstone of the Malmesbury group, similar in character, dip, and strike, to the exposed rocks of Robben Island and Mouille Point. The seabed comprises large areas of partly exposed bedrock and patches of fine to coarse sand.

=== Navigational hazards ===
- Whale Rock: The site of several shipwrecks and groundings.
- Green Point: The site of several shipwrecks and groundings.

== Image gallery ==
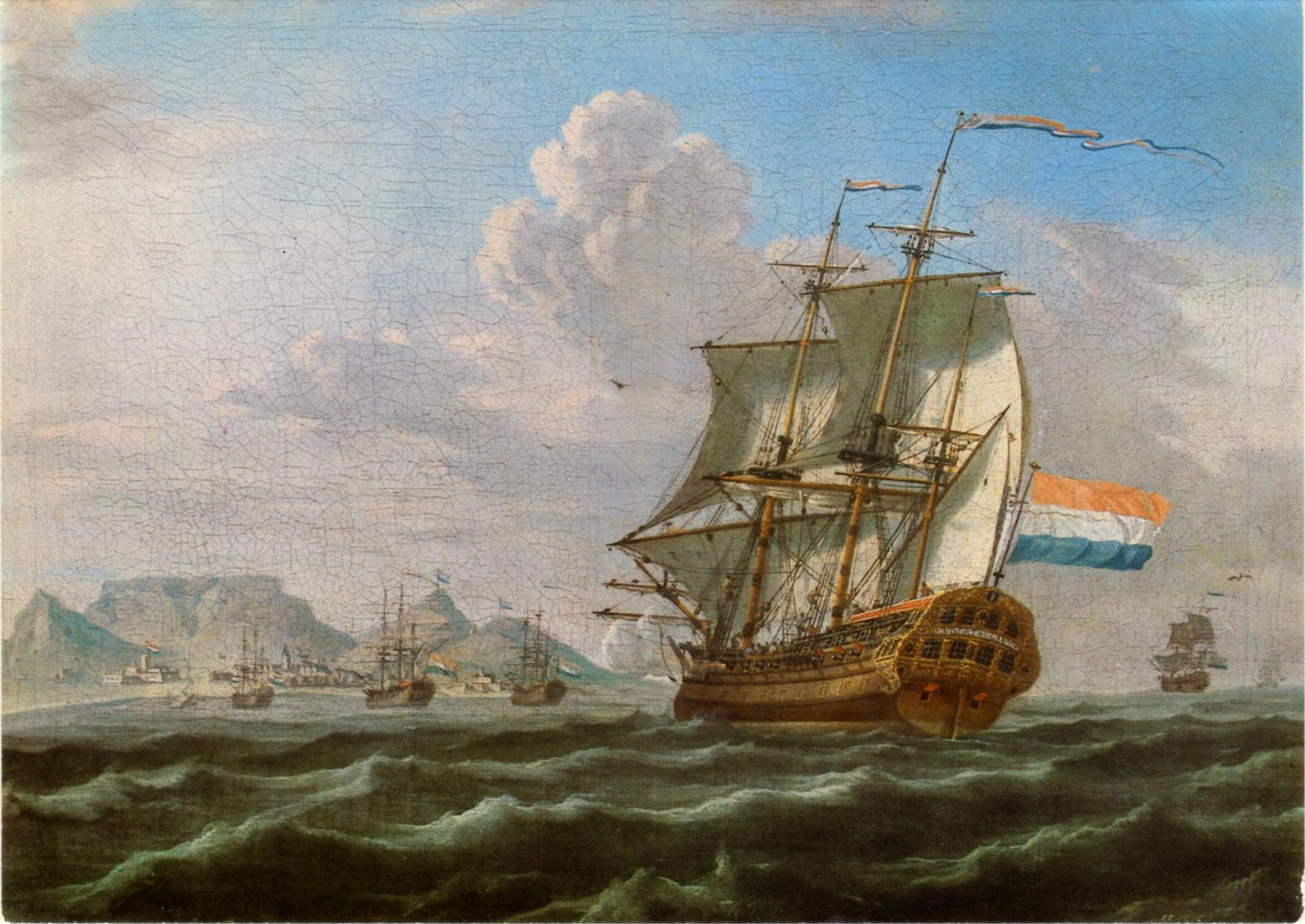
Dutch ships off Table Bay in 1763

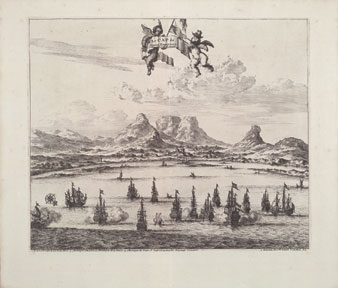
Looking over sailing ships in Table Bay in 1727 with Table Mountain in the background

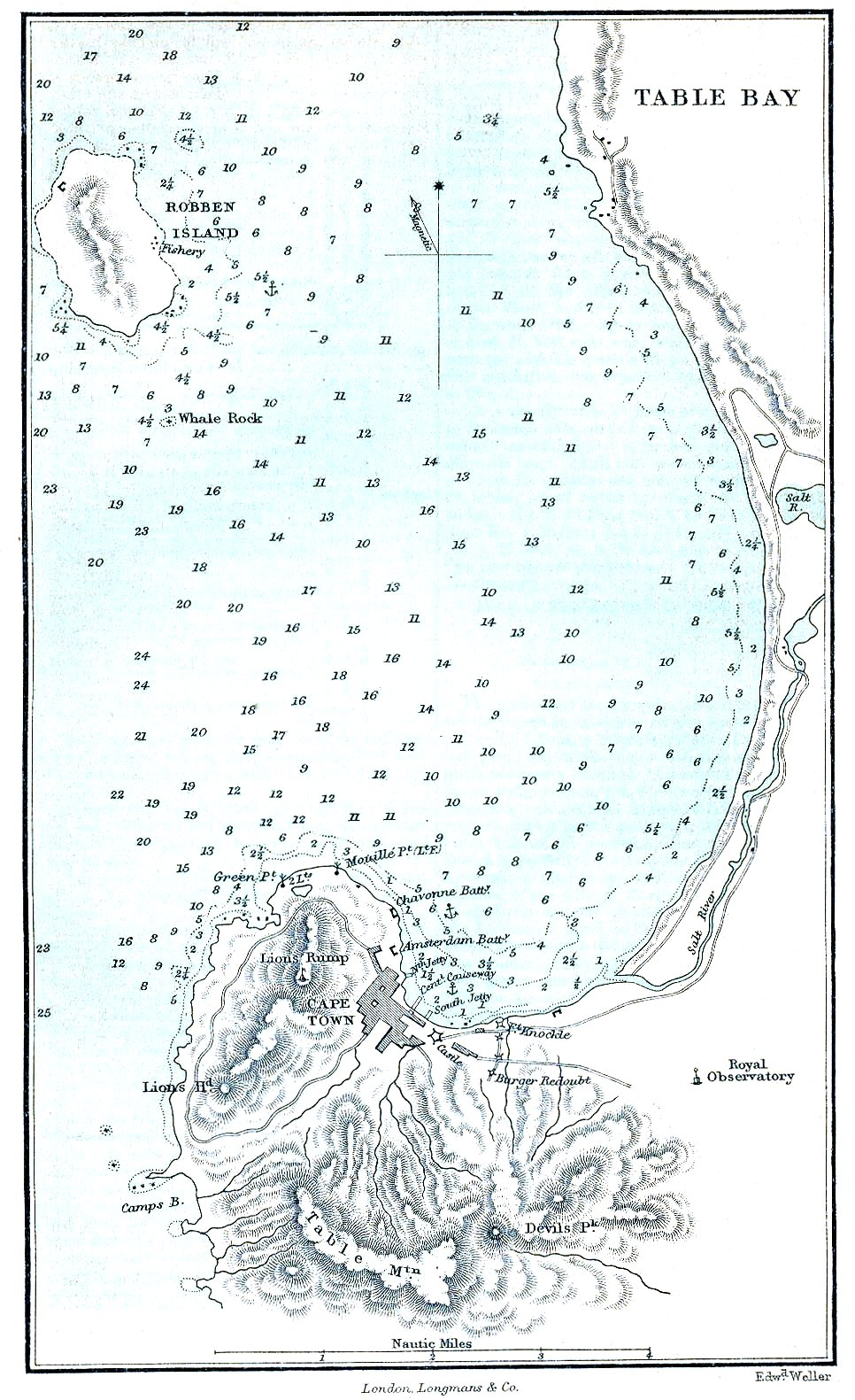
Map of Table Bay (1882)

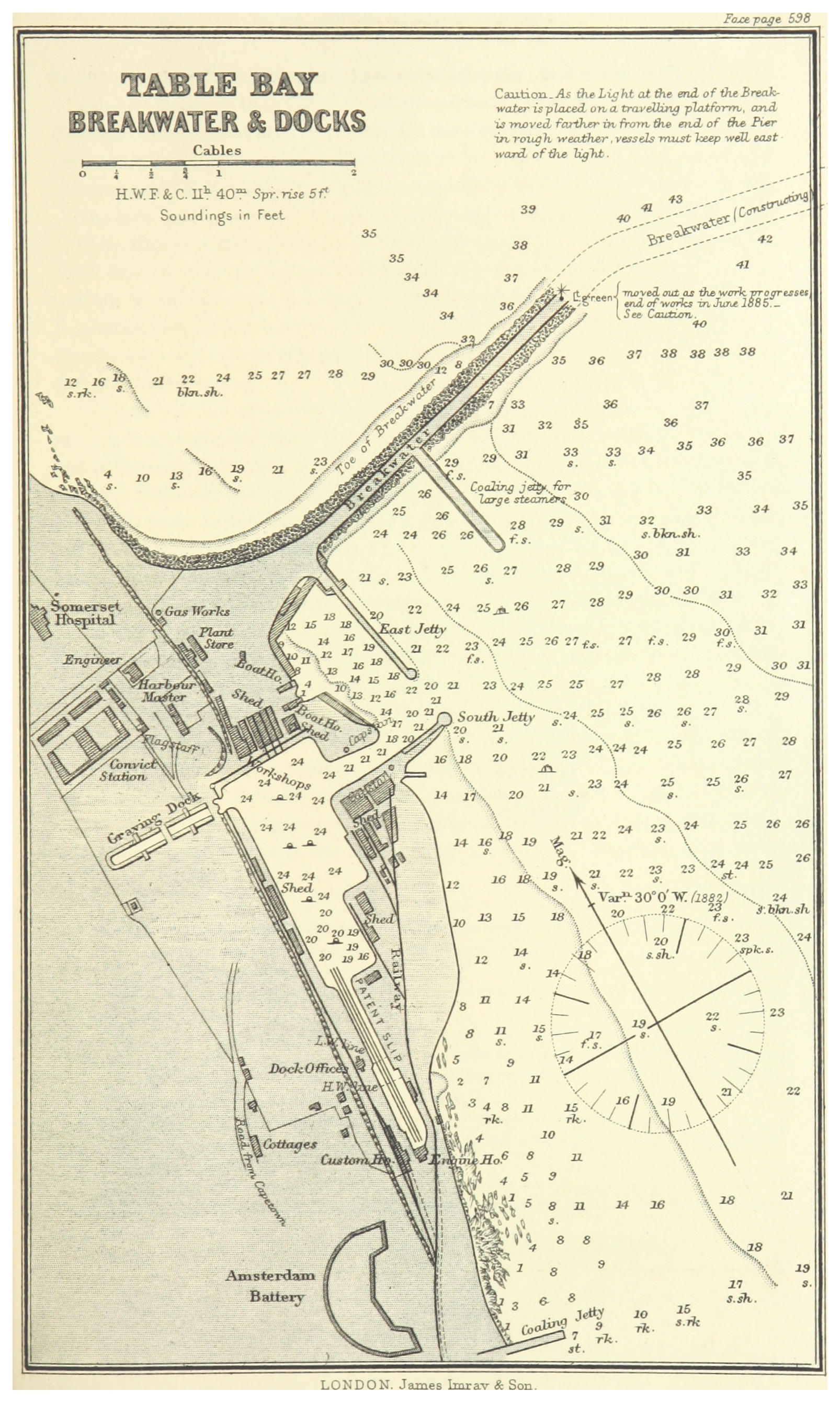
Map of the Docks and Infrastructure (1884)

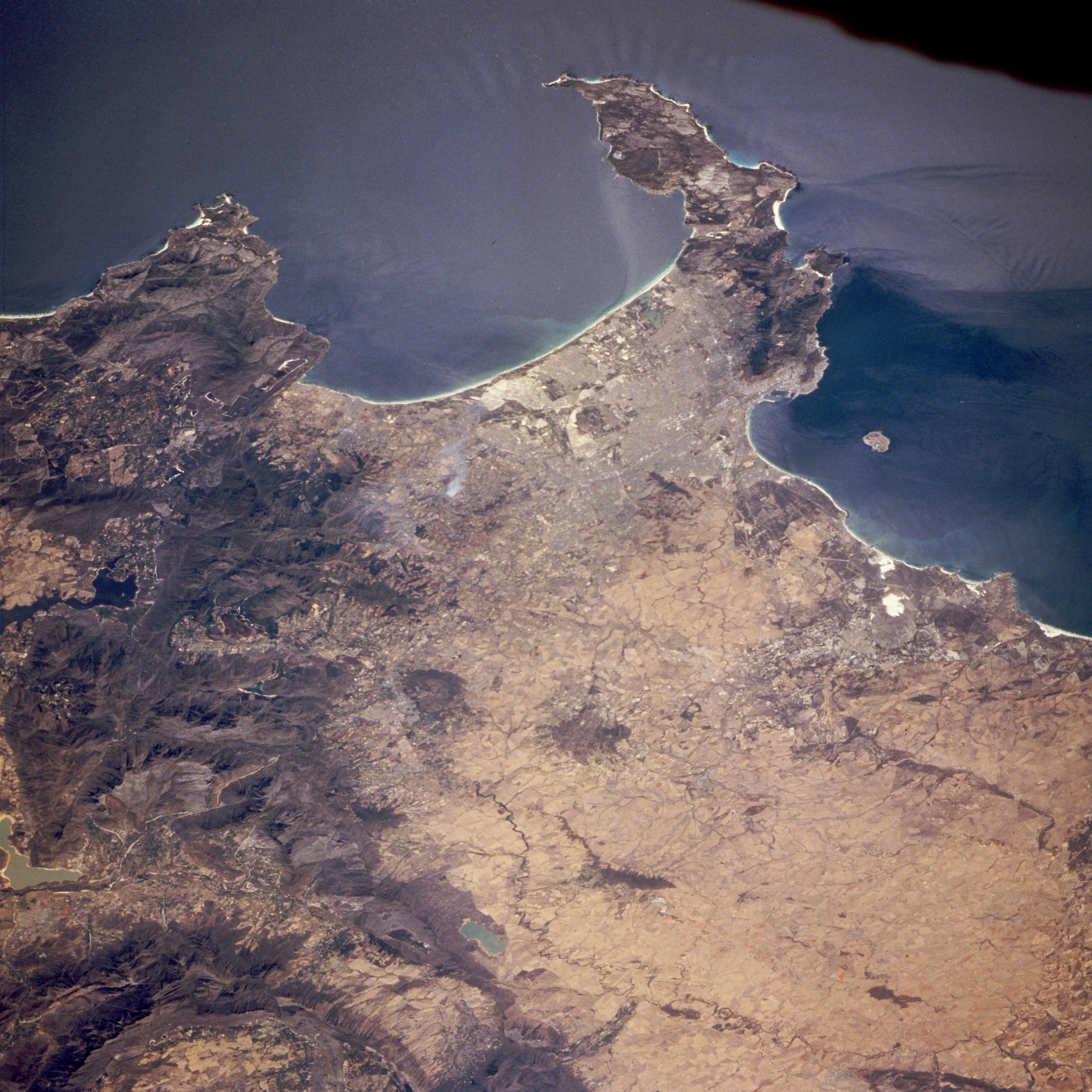
Cape Town from space, looking south over False Bay with Hangklip Point (top left), Cape Point (top right) and Table Bay south and east of the clearly visible, circular Robben Island, February 1995.

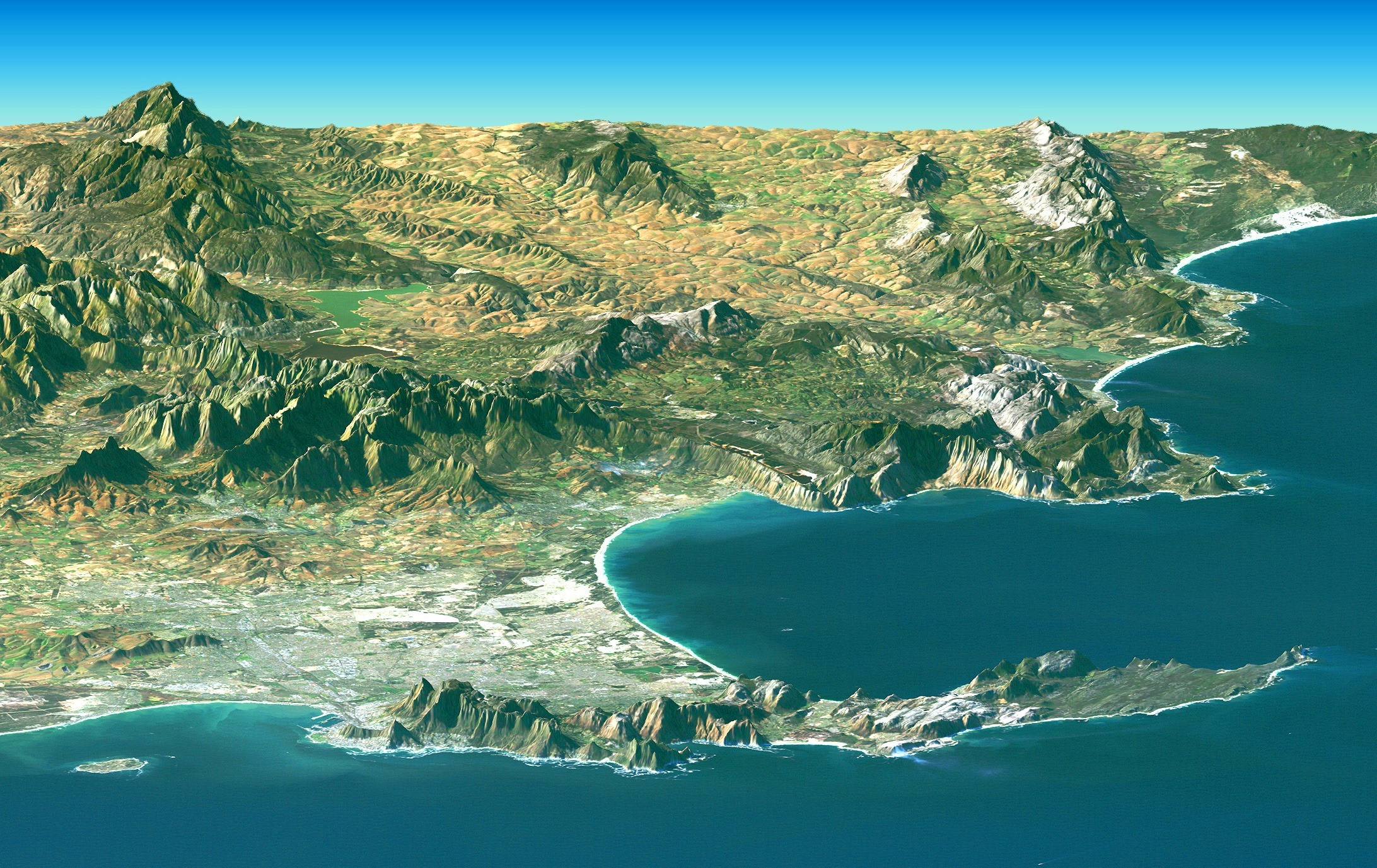
Synthetic perspective with 2× exaggerated elevation, from satellite elevation and image data. Looking east over Cape Peninsula and False Bay (behind) with Robben Island (front left), Table Mountain (centre front) and Cape Point (front right).

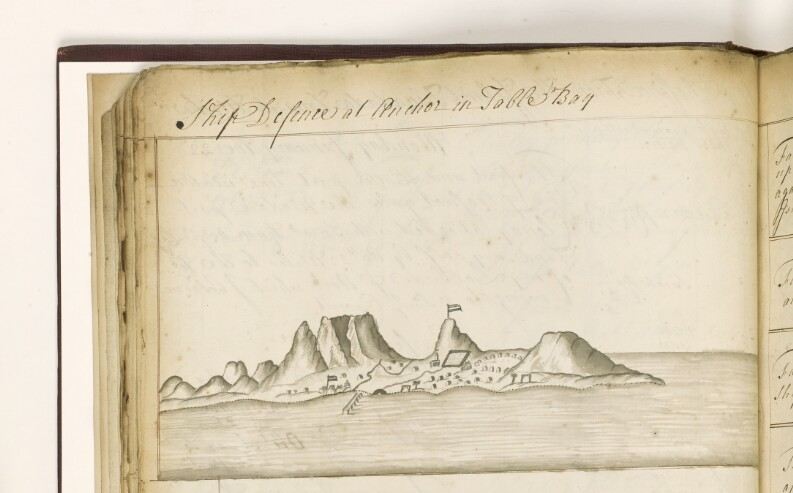
Sketch of Cape Town from the East India Company Ship Defense, en route from the Downs to Bombay, anchored in Table Bay on January 24, 1739.

== See also ==
- False Bay – Bay of the Atlantic Ocean at South Africa
- Port of Cape Town – Seaport of the city of Cape Town, South Africa
- Cape Peninsula – Rocky peninsula in the Western Cape, South Africa
- Robben Island – Island in Table Bay, South Africa
