= National defense (disambiguation) =

National defense is a nation's use of military, economic and political power to maintain survival.

National defense or national defence may also refer to:

- National Defense (Poland), a volunteer military formation of the Second Polish Republic
- National Defense (magazine), a business and technology magazine published by the National Defense Industrial Association
- National missile defense, a military strategy to shield a country from missiles
- Movement of National Defence, a Greek government during WWI

== See also ==
- Ministry of defence, part of a government responsible for matters of defence
- National security (disambiguation)
- Defense (disambiguation)
- National Defence Academy (disambiguation)
- National Defence University (disambiguation)
