= Priscilla Robertson =

American historian

Priscilla Robertson (1910 – November 26, 1989) was an American historian, magazine editor, and college professor who had a special interest in European social history, especially women's experiences. She was the editor of The Humanist magazine for several years and taught at both Indiana University and Harvard University.

== Family and education ==
She was born Priscilla Smith in Paris, France, but grew up in New England. Her father, Preserved Smith, was a historian. Her mother died when she was just three years old.

She graduated from Vassar College in 1930 with a degree in history.

She married Cary Robertson, who was Sunday editor of the Louisville Courier-Journal. They had three children and lived on a farm in Kentucky.

== Career ==
After college, she moved to Louisville, Kentucky, to work as a schoolteacher. She also worked as an organizer with the Southern Tenant Farmers Union. Following her marriage, she became the literary editor of the Louisville Courier-Journal.

In the early 1950s, she published her first two books. Lewis Farm: A New England Saga (1950) traced the changing patterns of life for the women of earlier generations of her own family and was privately printed. Revolutions of 1848: A Social History (1952) was the first major English-language survey of the revolutions of 1848. The New York Times praised it as in the best tradition of humanism.

In the mid 1950s, she went to work as an associate editor at The Humanist magazine, and moved up to editor in 1956. During her tenure as editor, she published work by the geneticist H. J. Muller, the psychologist Abraham Maslow, and the science fiction writers Miriam Allen deFord and Isaac Asimov. She also wrote for the magazine herself, contributing reviews and articles on diverse topics. She lost her job in 1959 over an editorial disagreement with the board of directors of the American Humanist Association, the magazine's publisher. The magazine's staff resigned en masse in a show of support for Robertson.

Robertson then moved on to teach at Indiana University (1962–1968) and Harvard University (1966), as well as several smaller schools. In 1982, she published her third book, An Experience of Women: Pattern and Change in 19th-Century Europe, a comparative study of the situations of women in England, France, Italy, and Germany.

She also helped found the Kentucky Humanities Council and the Kentucky League of Women Voters, and she chaired the board of the Kentucky Civil Liberties Union.

In 1956, she received the National Institute of Arts and Letters Award.

Priscilla Robertson died of a stroke in Louisville, Kentucky. Her papers are held by Vassar College.
