= National Defence Academy (disambiguation) =

The National Defence Academy is the Joint Services academy of the Indian Armed Forces.

National Defence Academy or National Defense Academy may refer to:

- National Defense Academy of Japan, university-level military academy of the Japan Self-Defense Forces
- National Defence Academy of Latvia, an institution of higher education and scientific research in Riga, Latvia
- Academy of National Defence, Poland
- National Defense Academy (Georgia)

== See also ==
- NDA (disambiguation)
- National defense (disambiguation)
