= N'Da =

N'Da is a surname. Notable people with the surname include:

- Jacques N'da (born 1984), Ivorian footballer
- Julien N'Da (born 1985), Ivorian-French footballer
- Lucienne N'Da (born 1965), Ivorian high jumper
