= Preserve (company) =

- Company type: Private
- Industry: Retail
- Founded: 1996
- Founder: Eric Hudson
- Headquarters: Waltham, Massachusetts
- Areas served: United States, Canada
- Products: Sustainable consumer goods
- Website: preserveproducts.com

Preserve is an American sustainable consumer goods company that creates recyclable household products from recycled No.5 polypropylene plastic. The company was founded in 1996 by Eric Hudson, a Babson alum, and it is headquartered in Waltham, Massachusetts. Preserve uses recycled and post consumer plastic to create all of its products from toothbrushes and razors to kitchenware.

== History ==
Preserve's parent company, Recycline, was founded in 1996 by Eric Hudson. Hudson collaborated with dentists and industrial designers to design the Preserve toothbrush (the company's first product), which was launched in March 1997. The company's line has since expanded to include other products such as kitchen tools and tableware.

== Products ==
Preserve razor handles are produced from recycled plastics, 65% of which come from yogurt containers. Preserve also produces and sells mixing bowls, cutting boards, measuring cups, food storage containers and colanders - all made from recycled materials.

Preserve's products are made in the USA, BPA free, microwave safe, not tested on animals, and sold nationally in stores such as Whole Foods Market, Trader Joe's, Hannaford, The TJX Companies, and Amazon.

== Process ==
Preserve sources the plastic used to make their products from individuals looking to recycle and companies collecting #5 plastic. The company uses the recycled polypropylene plastic, most notably sourced from yogurt and hummus containers, to create eco-friendly household products. So far, Preserve has reused over 100 tons of recycled materials.

== Gimme 5 ==
To further encourage the recycling of No. 5 plastic, Preserve initiated the Gimme 5 Program in 2009 - a nationwide program run in conjunction with Whole Foods Market. Gimme 5 is a partnership between Preserve and various like-minded companies such as Stonyfield Farm and Berry Plastics. Gimme 5 collection bins are set up in over 200 Whole Foods Markets, nationwide. These bins serve to collect these companies’ #5 plastic containers, as well as Brita pitcher and water bottle filters and Plum Organics caps. Consumers can drop off their clean, rigid plastics stamped with a “5” at any Gimme 5 station nationwide. Berry Plastics, Whole Foods and Preserve manage all of the collection and recycling. As a result of the program, Whole Foods recycled nearly 300,000 pounds of No. 5 plastics in 2012. Approximately 10-20% of the No. 5 materials used in Preserve products came from the Gimme 5 program. A partnership with Recyclebank also allows consumers to earn points for their recycling efforts. As of 2022, Preserve's Gimme 5 program has closed down. Their testimony as to why can be found below "Gimme 5 Overview" on their online store.
