= Protection, Georgia =

Unincorporated community in Georgia, U.S.

Coordinates: 34°41′09″N 84°18′57″W

Protection is an unincorporated community in Gilmer County, Georgia, United States.

== History ==
A post office called Protection was established in 1890, and remained in operation until 1934. The origin of the name "Protection" is obscure.
