= Defence (1735 EIC ship) =

History

Great Britain
- Name: Defence
- Owner: Reginald Kemys
- Builder: Thomas Bronsdon, Deptford
- Launched: 11 June 1735
- Fate: Sold 1743

General characteristics
- Type: East Indiaman
- Tons burthen: 485 (rated), (Note: It was standard practice for some time for the EIC to declare a burthen of 499 tons, or fewer. By doing so the company avoided the expense of paying for a chaplain as required by law for vessels of 500 tons or over.) or 550 (bm)
- Crew: 97
- Armament: 30 guns

Defence was launched in 1735 at Deptford. She made three voyages to India, the Red Sea, and China for the British East India Company (EIC) between 1736 and 1743 before she was sold out of the EIC's service

== Career ==
1st EIC voyage (1736–1837): Captain James Montgomery sailed from the Downs on 6 February 1736, bound for Madras, Bengal, and Bombay. Defence reached Madras on 26 July. She was at Fulta and by 22 October at Ingeli. On 23 November she was at Anjengo. She reached Cochin on 27 November and Tellicherry on 4 December, and arrived at Bombay on 24 December. Homeward bound, she was at Cochin again on 10 February 1837 and Anjengo on 13 February. She reached St Helena on 3 June and arrived back at the Downs on 22 August.

On this voyage Montgomery at some point unexpectedly found himself close to Ceylon. Defence struck three times on the south end of the bank near Batacalo, but quickly got into deep water.

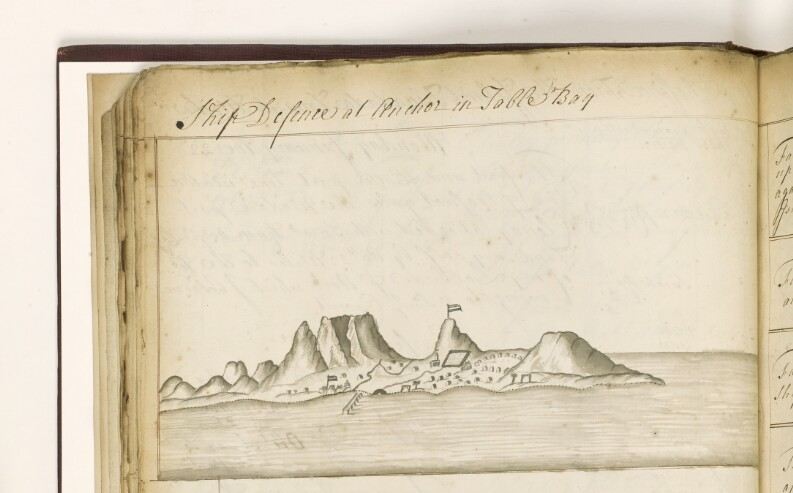
Defense anchored at Table Bay on January 24, 1739.

2nd EIC voyage (1738–1740): Captain Thomas Coates sailed from the Downs on 8 November 1738, bound for Mokha and Bombay. Defence reached the Cape of Good Hope on 25 January 1739 and arrived at Mokha on 15 April. On 6 August she arrived at Bombay. Homeward-bound, she was at Tellicherry on 17 September, Cochin on 23 September, Anjengo on 5 October, and the Cape on 5 January 1740. She reached St Helena on 27 January, and arrived back at the Downs on 16 September.

3rd EIC voyage (1742–1743): Captain Coates sailed from the Downs on 9 February 1742, bound for China. Defence reached the Whampoa Anchorage on 13 July. Homeward bound, she crossed the Second Bar on 25 January 1743, reached St Helena on 1 May, and arrived back at the Downs on 6 August.

== Fate ==
Defence was sold out of the EIC's service in 1743.
