= HMS Defence =

Several ships of the Royal Navy have been named HMS Defence:

- HMS Defence (1763), launched in 1763, fought in many battles in the American Revolutionary War, the French Revolutionary Wars and the Napoleonic Wars.
- HMS Defence (1815) was a 74-gun ship of the line, built in 1815 and broken up in 1857.
- HMS Defence (1861), launched in 1861, was an ironclad scrapped in 1935.
- HMS Defence (1907), launched in 1907, was an armoured cruiser sunk at the Battle of Jutland.
- Defence, a Minotaur-class cruiser was launched in 1945 but work on her was suspended until 1954. In 1957 she was renamed Lion.
