= Preserved Smith =

American historian

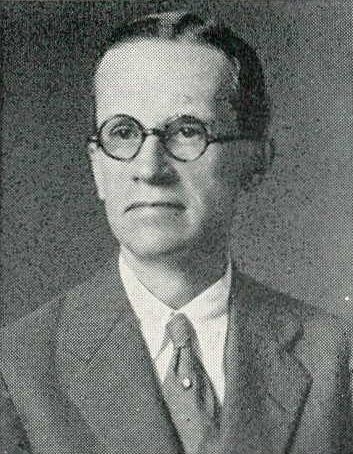
Preserved Smith, circa 1936

Preserved Smith (July 22, 1880 – May 15, 1941) was an American historian of the Protestant Reformation.

He was the son of Henry Preserved Smith, a scholar of the Old Testament, and inherited his name from a line of Puritan ancestors stretching back to the 17th century. He attended Amherst College and Columbia University, where he received his Ph.D. in 1907, and continued studies at the Sorbonne and the University of Berlin. Like his mentor James Harvey Robinson at Columbia, he had a high respect for science and a belief that knowledge of history was a way to improve human prospects for the future. He taught at Cornell University as a member of the Department of History from 1923 to 1941. He was elected to the American Philosophical Society in 1937.

His doctoral dissertation was a critical study of the Table Talk of Martin Luther and he wrote major biographies of Luther and Erasmus. Smith was a professor at Amherst College, Cornell University, Harvard University, and Williams College.

His daughter, Priscilla Robertson, was also an American historian.
