= Henry Preserved Smith =

American theologian (1847–1927)

Henry Preserved Smith (October 12, 1847 – February 26, 1927) was an American biblical scholar.

Smith was born in Troy, Ohio. He graduated at Amherst College in 1869 and studied theology in Lane Theological Seminary in 1869–1872, in Berlin in 1872–1874 and in Leipzig in 1876–1877. He was instructor in church history in 1874–1875, and in Hebrew in 1875–1876, and was assistant professor in 1877–1879 and professor in 1879–1893 of Hebrew and Old Testament exegesis in Lane Theological Seminary.

In 1892 he was tried for heresy by the Presbytery of Cincinnati, was found guilty of teaching (in a pamphlet entitled Biblical Scholarship and Inspiration, 1891) that there were "errors of historic fact," suppressions of "historic truths," etc., in the Books of Chronicles, and that the "inspiration of the Holy Scriptures is consistent with the 'unprofitableness of portions of the sacred writings,'" – in other words, that inspiration does not imply inerrancy – and he was suspended from the ministry.

Smith retired from the denomination, and in 1893, upon becoming a professor at Andover Theological Seminary, entered the ministry of the Congregational Church. From 1897 to 1906 he was a professor in Amherst College, and in 1907 became a professor in the Meadville Theological School.

He published The Bible and Islam (1897), Critical and Exegetical Commentary on the Books of Samuel (1899, in the "International Critical Commentary") and Old Testament History (1903, in the "International Theological Library"). In Inspiration and Inerrancy (Cincinnati, 1893), he reprinted the papers on which the heresy charge was made, and outlined the case. His son was Preserved Smith.
