= Defence (1803 ship) =

History

United Kingdom
- Name: Defence
- Builder: Simon Temple, South Shields
- Launched: 1803, or 1804
- Fate: Wrecked 31 March 1832

General characteristics
- Tons burthen: 423, or 428 (bm)
- Propulsion: Sail
- Armament: 1805: 8 × 18-pounder carronades

Defence was launched in 1803 at South Shields. She spent much of her career as a London-based transport. In the 1820s she sailed between Scotland and North America, particularly to Canada. She was wrecked in March 1832.

== Career ==
Defence first appeared in the Register of Shipping (RS) in 1804 with Trotter, master, S. Temple, owner, and trade London coaster.

Year	Master	Owner	Trade	Source & notes
1805	J.Downs	Duncan	London transport	RS
1810	Stuckfield	T&R Brown	London transport	RS
1815	Stuckfield; J. Carr	T&R Brown	Plymouth transport	RS
1820	Reynoldson	T&R Brown	London transport	RS; good repair 1815
1825	Rodgers	T&R Brown	Leith—Miramichi, New Brunswick	RS; good repair 1815
1830	Rodgers	T&R Brown	London–New York	RS; thorough repair 1827
1832	Kennear	Duncannon	Leith–Quebec	RS; thorough repair 1827

== Fate ==
Defense was sailing from Alloa to Quebec when she was totally wrecked on 31 March 1832 near the entrance of Longhope, Orkney. Her crew was saved. On 10 April 1832 Lloyd's List too reported that Defence, Kinnear, master, had been totally wrecked near Longhope.
