= Biological defense =

Biological defense may refer to:

- Biological defense mechanism, a form of adaptation that promotes the survivability of an organism by protecting it from its natural enemies, such as predators (Anti-predator adaptation) or pathogens (Immune system)
- In law, a claim that some biological factor present in the defendant provides a defense against the accused crimes, as in the so-called Twinkie defense
- Biodefense, defense against biological warfare
