= List of sailing frigates of the United States Navy =

Ships of the United States Navy

Ships in current service
- Current ships

Ships grouped alphabetically
- A–B; C; D–F; G–H; I–K; L; M; N–O; P; Q–R; S; T–V; W–Z

Ships grouped by type
- Aircraft carriers; Airships; Amphibious warfare ships; Auxiliaries; Battlecruisers; Battleships; Cruisers; Destroyers; Destroyer escorts; Destroyer leaders; Escort carriers; Frigates; Hospital ships; Littoral combat ships; Mine warfare vessels; Monitors; Oilers; Patrol vessels; Registered civilian vessels; Sailing frigates; Steam frigates; Steam gunboats; Ships of the line; Sloops of war; Submarines; Torpedo boats; Torpedo retrievers; Unclassified miscellaneous; Yard and district craft

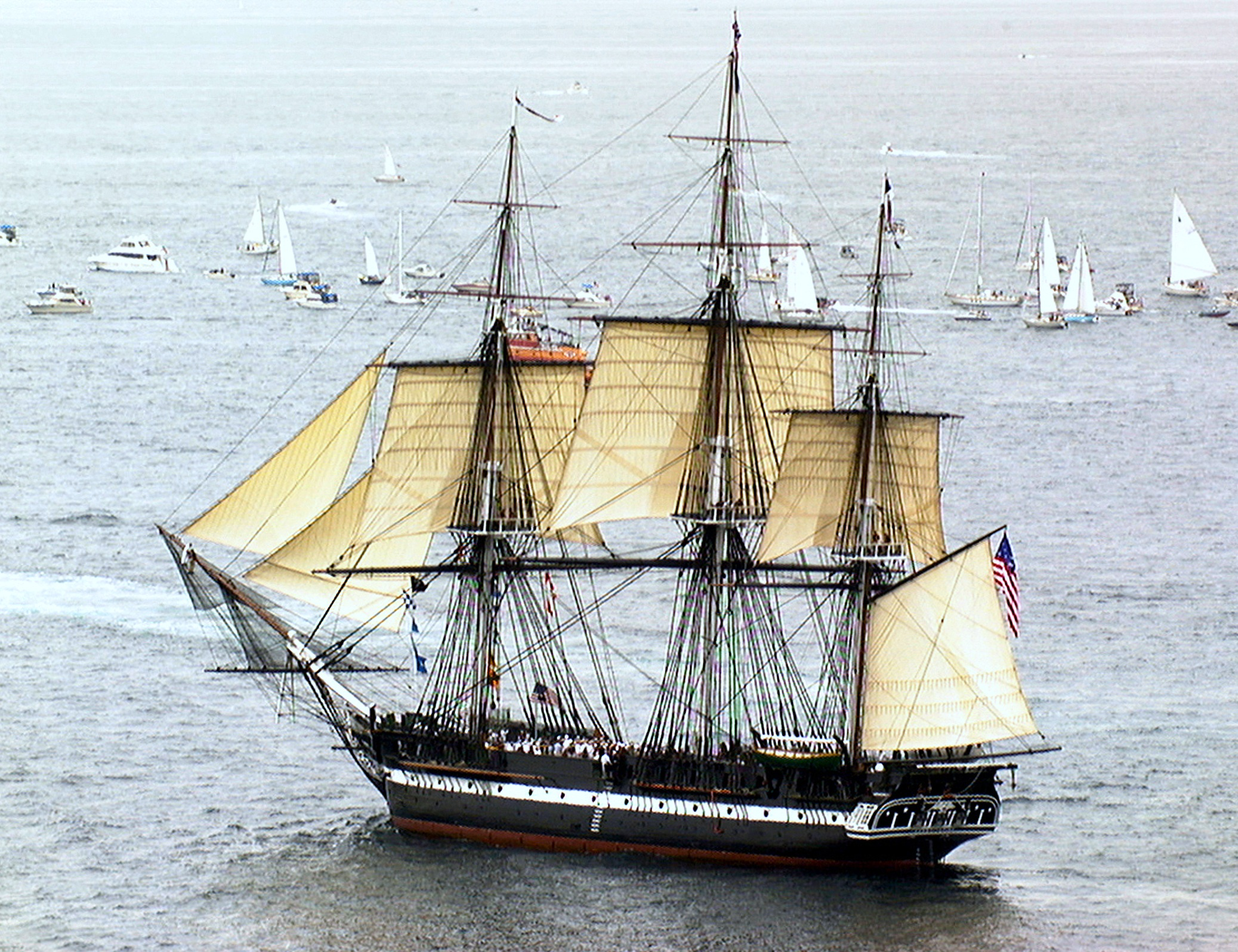
USS Constitution in 1997

This is a list of sailing frigates of the United States Navy. Frigates were the backbone of the early Navy, although the list shows that many suffered unfortunate fates.

The sailing frigates of the United States built from 1797 on were unique in that their framing was made of American live oak, a particularly hardy genus that made very resilient hulls; as a result of this, the ships were known to withstand damage that would have scuppered frigates of other nations. American frigates were also very heavily armed; the USN's 44s carried 24-pound cannon as opposed to the 18-pounders usual in frigates, and like most ships of the period carried more than their nominal rate, 56 guns or more. On the other hand, the USN classed ships with 20 to 26 guns as "third-class frigates", whereas the Royal Navy did not.

== Continental Navy ==
Congress authorized 3 frigates of 18, 13 frigates of 12 ( 5 of 32, 5 of 28 and 3 of 24)

| Name | Class | Rate | Dates of service | Fate |
|---|---|---|---|---|
| Alliance | Alliance-class | 36 | 1778–1785 | abandoned near Philadelphia |
| Bonhomme Richard | Massiac-class | 42 | 1779–1779 | sank after taking Serapis |
| Boston | Boston-class | 24 | 1777–1780 | captured by the British |
| Bourbon | Alliance-class | 28 | 1783 | never completed |
| Bricole | | 36 | 1764 | built in France, Le Havre |
| Confederacy | Alliance-class | 36 | 1778–1781 | captured by the British |
| Congress (II) | | 28 | 1776–1777 | never completed |
| Deane | | 24 | 1778–1783 | built in France, Nantes |
| Delaware | | 24 | 1776–1777 | captured by the British |
| Effingham | | 28 | 1777 | never completed |
| Fox | Enterprise-class | 28 | 7 June 1777 – 8 July 1777 | captured by Hancock and Boston in June 1777, recaptured by HMS Flora |
| Hancock | Hancock-class | 32 | 1776–1777 | captured by the British |
| Montgomery | | 24 | 1776–1777 | destroyed to prevent capture, Hudson River |
| Protector | | 26 | 1779–1781 | captured, become HMS Hussar 1781; 20 guns 586 tons |
| Providence | Providence-class | 28 | 1776–1780 | captured by the British, Charleston, South Carolina |
| Queen of France | | 28 | 1777–1780 | sunk to avoid capture by the British |
| Raleigh | Hancock-class | 32 | 1776–1778 | captured by the British, Matinicus Isle, Maine |
| Randolph | Randolph-class | 32 | 1776–1778 | exploded in battle, 311 killed |
| Serapis | Roebuck-class | 44 | 1779–1781 | transferred to the French |
| South Carolina | | 40 | 1777–1782 | built in Holland, biggest war-ship |
| Truite | | 26 | 1779–1780 | built in France, Le Havre |
| Trumbull | Providence-class | 28 | 1776–1781 | captured by the British |
| Virginia | | 28 | 1776–1778 | captured by the British |
| Warren | Randolph-class | 32 | 1776–1779 | destroyed to prevent capture, Penobscot Expedition |
| Washington | Randolph-class | 32 | 1776–1777 | destroyed to prevent capture, Philadelphia |

== United States Navy ==
| Name | Type | Rate | Class | Dates of service | Fate |
|---|---|---|---|---|---|
| Adams | 2nd class | 28 | | 1799–1814 | scuttled and burned to prevent capture |
| Baltimore | 3rd class | 32 | | 1798–1801 | sold |
| Boston | 2nd class | 28 | | 1799–1814 | burned to prevent capture |
| Brandywine | 1st class | 50 | Potomac-class | 1825–1864 | destroyed by fire |
| Chesapeake | 2nd class | 36 (38) | United States-class | 1800–1813 | captured by the British |
| Columbia | 1st class | 44 | Guerriere-class | 1813–1814 | burned on the stocks to prevent capture |
| Columbia | 1st class | 50 | Potomac-class | 1838–1861 | scuttled and burned to prevent capture |
| Congress | 2nd class | 36 (38) | United States-class | 1799–1834 | broken up |
| Congress | 1st class | 52 | | 1841–1862 | burned and sank after action with CSS Virginia |
| Connecticut | 3rd class | 24 | | 1799–1801 | sold |
| Constellation | 2nd class | 36 (38) | United States-class | 1797–1853 | broken up |
| Constitution | 1st class | 44 | United States-class | 1797 to date | remains in commission |
| Cumberland | 1st class | 50 | Potomac-class | 1842–1855 | converted to sloop 1855 sunk by CSS Virginia 1862 |
| Cyane | 3rd class | 22 | Banterer-class | 1815–1836 | broken up |
| Delaware | 3rd class | 20 | | 1798–1801 | sold |
| Essex | 2nd class | 32 | | 1799–1814 | captured by the British |
| Ganges | 3rd class | 24 | | 1798–1801 | sold |
| General Greene | 2nd class | 30 | | 1799–1805 | hulked; destroyed by fire 1814 |
| George Washington | 3rd class | 24 | | 1798–1802 | sold |
| Guerriere | 1st class | 44 | Java-class | 1814–1841 | broken up |
| Hudson | 1st class | 44 | | 1828–1844 | broken up |
| Independence | 1st class | 54 | | 1836–1912 | Built 1814 as a 90-gun ship-of-the-line, razeed 1836, scrapped 1915 at San Francisco. |
| Insurgent | 2nd class | 32 | Sémillante-class | 1799–1800 | lost at sea with all hands |
| Java | 1st class | 44 | Java-class | 1814–1842 | broken up, Norfolk, Virginia |
| John Adams | 2nd class | 28 | | 1799–1867 | razeed to 20-gun corvette 1807; rebuilt as 24-gun frigate 1812 sold |
| Macedonian | 2nd class | 38 | Lively-class | 1812–1828 | broken up, Norfolk, Virginia |
| Macedonian | 2nd class | 36 | | 1836–1852 | razeed to sloop-of war, 1852 sold 1871 |
| Merrimack | 3rd class | 24 | | 1798–1801 | sold |
| Mohawk | 2nd class | 38 | | 1814–1823 | sunk |
| Montezuma | 3rd class | 20 | | 1798–1799 | sold |
| New York | 2nd class | 36 | | 1800–1814 | burned by the British |
| Philadelphia | 1st class | 44 (36) | | 1799–1804 | captured by Tripoli boarded and burned by Stephen Decatur |
| Plattsburg | 1st class | 64 | | 1814–1825 | sold on ways |
| Portsmouth | 3rd class | 24 | | 1798–1801 | sold |
| Potomac | 1st class | 50 | Potomac-class | 1831–1877 | sold |
| President | 1st class | 44 | United States-class | 1800–1815 | captured by the British |
| Raritan | 1st class | 50 | Potomac-class | 1843–1861 | destroyed to prevent capture |
| Sabine | 1st class | 52 | Sabine-class | 1855–1883 | sold |
| Santee | 1st class | 52 | Sabine-class | 1855–1912 | sank at moorings |
| Savannah | 1st class | 50 | Potomac-class | 1844–1857 | converted to sloop 1857 sold 1883 |
| St. Lawrence | 1st class | 50 | Potomac-class | 1848–1875 | sold |
| Superior | 1st class | 50 | | 1814–1825 | sold |
| Trumbull | 3rd class | 24 | | 1799–1801 | sold |
| United States | 1st class | 44 | United States-class | 1797–1861; 1862–1866 | broken up for scrap |
| Warren | 3rd class | 24 | | 1799–1801 | sold |

== See also ==
- List of sloops of war of the United States Navy
- List of United States Navy ships
- Bibliography of early United States naval history
- Continental Navy
- Pages that link to this list
