= USS St. Lawrence =

Frigate of the United States Navy, launched 1848

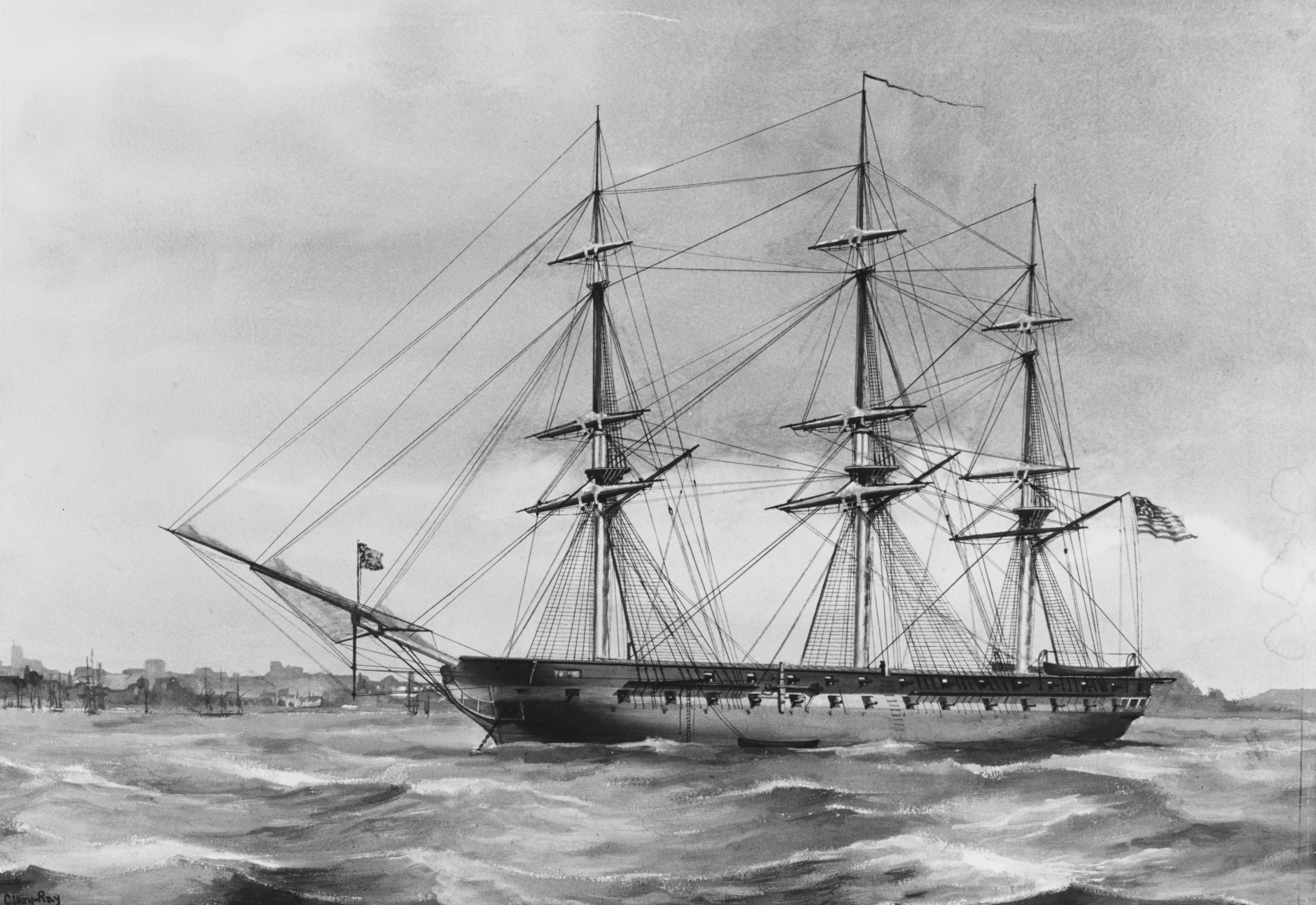
- Wash of St. Lawrence from 1897

History

United States
- Name: USS St. Lawrence
- Builder: Norfolk Navy Yard
- Laid down: 1826
- Launched: 1848
- Commissioned: 17 August 1848
- Decommissioned: 15 November 1850
- Recommissioned: 5 February 1851
- Decommissioned: 18 August 1851
- Recommissioned: 18 November 1851
- Decommissioned: 21 May 1855
- Recommissioned: 22 September 1856
- Decommissioned: 25 May 1859
- Recommissioned: 21 June 1861
- Decommissioned: 30 May 1863
- Recommissioned: 5 August 1863
- Decommissioned: 12 December 1865
- Fate: Sold 31 December 1875

General characteristics
- Class & type: Brandywine-class frigate
- Tonnage: 1726
- Length: 175 ft (53 m)
- Beam: 45 ft (14 m)
- Depth of hold: 14 ft 5 in (4.39 m)
- Propulsion: Sail
- Complement: 480 officers and enlisted
- Armament: 8 × 8 in (200 mm) shell guns; 42 × 32-pounder guns

USS St. Lawrence was a Potomac-class frigate of the United States Navy. Laid down in 1826, she was completed for service in the Mexican-American war, and commissioned in 1848. Instead, she sailed to Europe to train Prussian sailors and made several other trans-Atlantic voyages. In 1851, she was reassigned to the Pacific to serve as the Pacific squadron's flagship before she was reassigned to sail to Brazil as part of the Paraguay expedition in 1856. During the American Civil War, she joined the Union Blockade and seized several blockade runners before running aground at the Battle of Hampton Roads. After the battle, she protected Washington D.C. and rejoined the blockade before she was decommissioned and reused as a storeship in 1863. She was then reused as a barracks ship before being sold of in 1875.

== Development ==
Of the original six frigates of the United States Navy, the three designed to carry 44 guns achieved early success during the War of 1812. In response, Congress authorized the construction of six additional 44-gun heavy frigates, which became known as the Java class in 1813. However, their wartime construction proved detrimental; in the rush to complete the ships quickly, the quality of materials and craftsmanship suffered. Only two vessels of the class entered service, both of which had short operational careers due to issues regarding their hurried development.

Four years later, Congress authorized the construction of nine additional frigates as part of a peacetime "gradual increase" of the Navy. In an effort to avoid a repeat of the Java class, the Navy emphasized a deliberate construction process, which allowed time to source high-quality materials and ensure quality craftsmanship. Congress did not allocate sufficient funding to complete all of the newly authorized frigates. Instead, the Navy adopted a strategy of constructing the ships nearly to completion, after which they were laid up in shipyards under protective structures. This approach was intended to preserve the hulls, as launching the ships prematurely would have led to rapid deterioration and would have been costly. The plan was to launch and complete each vessel in the event of war, thus retaining the quality vessels without the high cost associated with maintaining them during peacetime. The class would include St. Lawrence and her eight sister ships to form the Potomac-class frigates. She was laid down at the Norfolk Navy Yard in 1826, and was only launched in 1848 and commissioned on 17 August in preparation for the Mexican-American war.

== Service history ==
=== European voyage, 1848–1850 ===
On 29 August, the Navy Department, at the request of the Prussian Minister to the United States, directed Paulding to "take on board a Mister H. W. Foster and rate him Master's Mate." The German states, then striving to establish a German Federation, had recently become aware of the need for a German navy and had asked the United States for help in establishing and training a national fighting force afloat. The ship got underway on 8 September and headed eastward across the Atlantic. After touching at Cowes, on the Isle of Wight, the ship reached the mouth of the Weser River on 7 October. The next day, she was towed to Bremerhaven. She remained at that port for the next month and one-half while Capt. Paulding visited important cities in several German states to discuss with various leaders matters important to the establishment of the new navy. Before departing Bremerhaven, St. Lawrence received on board four Prussian midshipmen for training, and they served on the frigate, learning the customs, discipline, and seamanship of the United States Navy.

The frigate left the mouth of the Weser on 22 November and reached Southampton, England, on 2 December. She was anchored at the port for more than a month while her officers and men exchanged courtesies with their English counterparts, building good will between the two nations. Early in January 1849, the ship sailed for Portugal and reached Lisbon on the 12th. But for a visit to Cadiz, Spain, from 5 February to 14 March, she remained at Lisbon until again sailing for England on 1 May. In July, she returned to Bremerhaven where Paulding discharged the German midshipmen on the 10th, since Prussia was then at war with Denmark, the next country on the frigate's itinerary. St. Lawrence got underway on the 19th and visited Copenhagen until 2 August when she sailed for Sweden. She arrived at Stockholm five days later and remained at that Baltic port until the 16th. On her voyage back south, the frigate touched again at Copenhagen, and spent much of the autumn at Bremerhaven before heading for the Mediterranean.

She reached Port Mahon, Minorca, in the Balearics, on 3 December 1849. At that time, political conditions in Europe were still unstable in the aftermath of the revolutions which had shaken Europe in 1848; and the American naval force in the Mediterranean had been increased to its greatest strength since the First Barbary War and the Second Barbary War. During the protracted series of crises, it had been a source of stability in the area without offending any nation or faction. In the summer of 1850, when tension in Europe began to subside, St. Lawrence was ordered to proceed once more to the Baltic for a short cruise before returning home. She touched at Boston, Massachusetts on 1 November, reached New York on the 6th, and was decommissioned there on the 15th.

=== Voyage to England, 1851 ===
Recommissioned on 5 February 1851, Commander Joshua R. Sands in command, the frigate departed New York on the 20th, carrying to England the exhibits from the United States for the Great Exhibition at London, the first modern world's fair. On her return voyage from this interesting assignment, she gave the United States chargé d'affaires in Portugal passage from Southampton to Lisbon. The ship reached New York on 11 August and decommissioned there a week later.

=== Pacific Squadron, 1851–1855 ===
Recommissioned on 18 November 1851, St. Lawrence sailed on 12 December for the Pacific. For the next three and one-half years, she cruised along the west coast of North and South America, from Cape Horn to Puget Sound, occasionally venturing as far west as the Sandwich (Hawaiian) Islands. In 1853, she relieved Raritan as flagship of the Pacific Squadron and continued this duty until she relinquished her role as flagship to Independence on 2 February 1855. She departed Valparaíso five days later and arrived at Hampton Roads on 21 April. She was decommissioned and placed in ordinary at Norfolk, Virginia exactly a month later.

=== Brazil Squadron, 1856–1859 ===
Recommissioned on 22 September 1856, St. Lawrence sailed for the Atlantic coast of South America to become flagship of the Brazil Squadron early the next year. Her service on the Brazil Station was enlivened late in 1858 by the Paraguay expedition, although St Lawrence herself did not go to Paraguay. The conclusion of the expedition freed St. Lawrence to return home, and she was decommissioned at Philadelphia, Pennsylvania on 25 May 1859.

=== American Civil War, 1861–1865 ===
Still in ordinary at the outbreak of the American Civil War, St. Lawrence was hurriedly prepared for action and recommissioned on 21 June 1861, Capt. Hugh Y. Purviance in command. She sailed for the Confederate coast eight days later but was delayed in the lower Delaware River by low tides until 8 July when she finally put to sea. After joining the Atlantic Blockading Squadron upon her arrival at Hampton Roads, she headed further south on the 14th. Two days later, she captured the British blockade runner, Herald, off Cape Hatteras, North Carolina. That vessel had escaped from Beaufort, North Carolina, laden with naval stores and was bound for Liverpool. Capt. Purviance sent the prize to Hampton Roads and continued his voyage south.

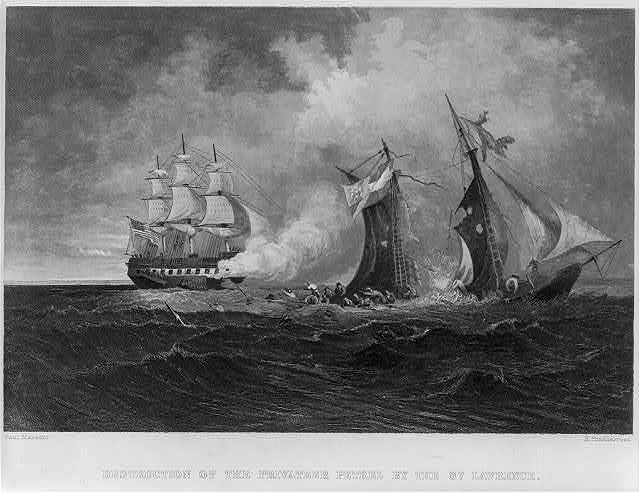
Destruction of the privateer Petrel by USS St. Lawrence.

On the 28th, a lookout on the frigate spotted a schooner flying British colors and gave chase. Some four hours later, as St. Lawrence was overhauling the schooner, the fleeing vessel ran up the Confederate flag and fired three shots at her pursuer. One passed through the frigate's "mainsail and took a splinter out of the main yard." St. Lawrence answered with her forecastle battery and hit the chase twice, once in her bow. Survivors from the schooner, which sank half an hour later, revealed that their ship had been the Confederate privateer, Petrel, of Charleston, South Carolina. Boats from St. Lawrence rescued all but two of the privateer's 38 crewmen and sent them north in the steamer USS Flag.

The frigate proceeded south and blockaded off Savannah, Georgia, until returning to Hampton Roads in September. However, after minor repairs and taking on provisions, she headed back to blockade duty off the Georgia coast. On 19 October, when responsibility for blockading the Confederate Atlantic coast was divided in two, St. Lawrence was assigned to the South Atlantic Blockading Squadron. On 6 November, she captured British schooner, Jenny Lee, of Nassau, New Providence, laden with rice and tobacco from Darien, Georgia, and headed for Nassau. St. Lawrence continued blockade duty, operating along the coasts of Georgia and South Carolina, until ordered north on 27 January 1862. After replenishing her ammunition, provisions and water at New York, the frigate sailed for the Virginia Capes for service in the North Atlantic Blockading Squadron.

==== Battle of Hampton Roads ====
She reached Hampton Roads on 6 March and was on hand when Confederate ironclad, Virginia, (formerly USS Merrimack) attacked Union warships there two days later. On that fateful afternoon, gunboat USS Cambridge, came alongside, with word of the ram raid, and towed St. Lawrence toward the scene of the action. As the two ships passed Sewell's Point, Southern batteries there opened fire with shot and shell and made several hits, but did no serious damage. The two Union warships responded in kind. As they approached the battle scene, observers on the Union warships learned that USS Cumberland had gone down, USS Congress had surrendered, and USS Minnesota had run hard aground. Then, St. Lawrence herself grounded. While Cambridge and tug, USS Young America, were attempting to refloat the frigate, Virginia opened fire from some 900 yards distance. St. Lawrence replied with rapid fire, but her projectiles glanced harmlessly off the ironclad's greased armor. One 80 pound (36 kg) shell from Virginia penetrated St. Lawrence's starboard quarter just above the water line and did considerable damage to her wardroom pantry and to the Assistant Surgeon's stateroom. Toward dusk, Virginia retired, planning to resume the task of destroying the Union men-of-war after the return of daylight. About 2000, St. Lawrence was again afloat; and she withdrew to the anchorage at Fort Monroe. That night, USS Monitor arrived and took position near Minnesota, still hard aground. The following day, Virginia returned to Hampton Roads where she engaged Monitor in a historic battle which, although inconclusive, revolutionized naval warfare.

After the battle in Hampton Roads, St. Lawrence served briefly in the Potomac River to protect the Federal capital from attack by sea. She returned to Hampton Roads late in April, but was reassigned to the East Gulf Blockading Squadron. St. Lawrence arrived at Key West, Florida on the 23rd and was soon at sea again looking for blockade runners operating between Cuba and the gulf coast. In July, she became flagship of the squadron, and she performed this duty until sailing north on 7 May 1863 because of a serious outbreak of yellow fever. The ship was decommissioned at Portsmouth Navy Yard on 30 May 1863. Recommissioned on 5 August, St. Lawrence sailed to Hampton Roads to become an ordnance ship for the North Atlantic Blockading Squadron. In 1865, she served as a store ship at Norfolk where she was decommissioned on 12 December.

=== Barracks ship, 1867–1875 ===
In ordinary through 1866, the frigate was used as a barracks ship for marines at Norfolk from 1867 through 1875. On 31 December 1875, she was sold at Norfolk to E. Stannard.

== See also ==
- Union Navy
- List of sailing frigates of the United States Navy
- Naval tactics in the Age of Sail
