= Mediterranean Squadron (United States) =

Military unit of the United States Navy

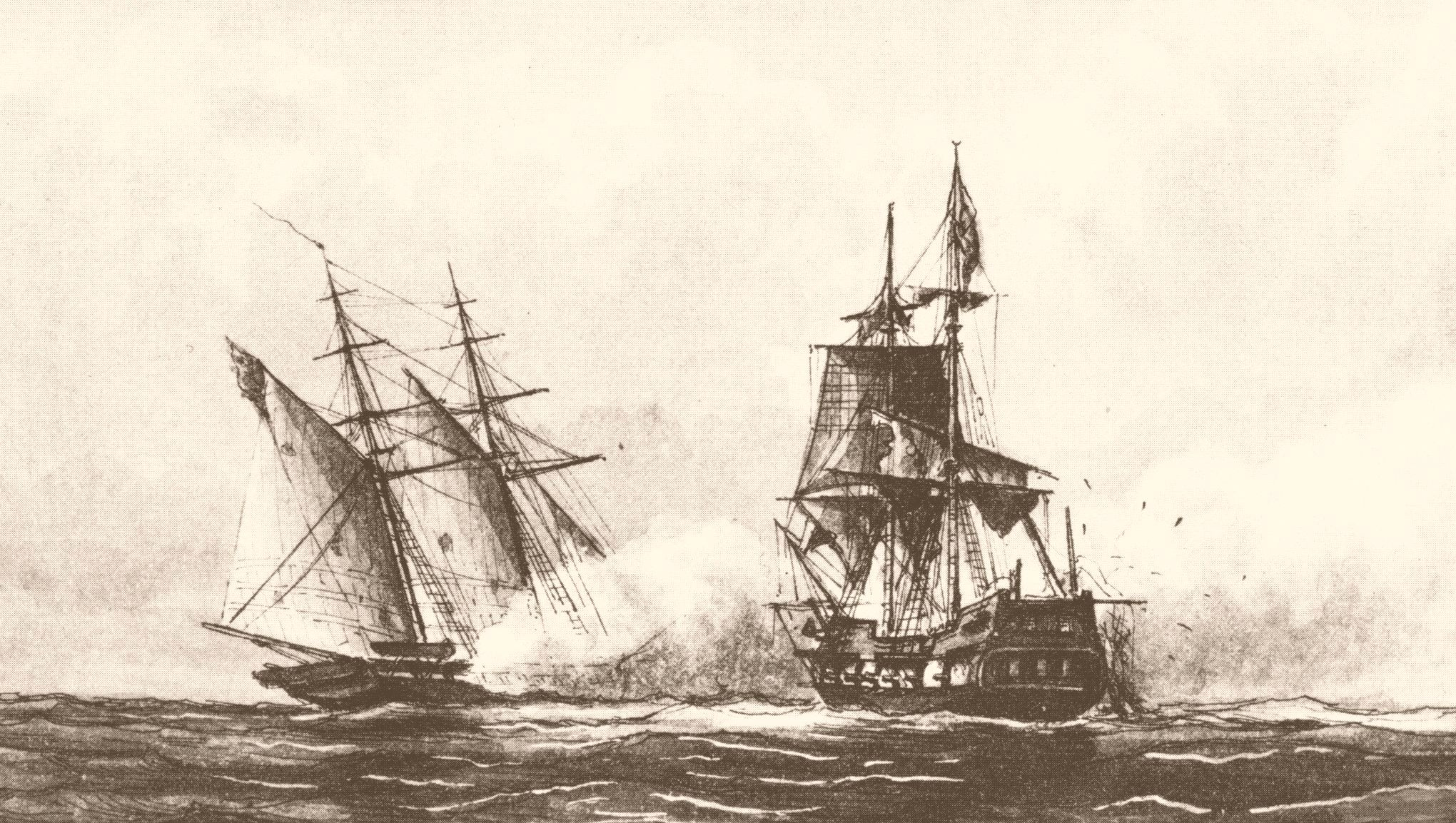
- USS Enterprise of the Mediterranean Squadron capturing the polacca Tripoli during the First Barbary War.
- Active: 1801–1865
- Country: United States of America
- Branch: United States Navy
- Type: Naval squadron
- Garrison/HQ: Mahón (1815–1840)

The Mediterranean Squadron, also known as the Mediterranean Station, was part of the United States Navy in the 19th century that operated in the Mediterranean Sea. It was formed in response to the First and Second Barbary Wars. Between 1801 and 1818, the squadron was composed of a series of rotating squadrons. Later, squadrons were sent in the 1820s to the 1860s to suppress piracy, primarily in Greece and to engage in gunboat diplomacy. In 1865 the force was renamed the European Squadron.

== History ==
=== First Barbary War ===
The Barbary pirates' seizure of US merchant ships began after American Revolutionary War ended in 1783. When the Dey of Algiers demanded tribute, the Americans refused and thus began a long series of conflict between the Barbary states and the United States lasting from the 1780s to 1815. The Mediterranean Squadron was created for the protection of American merchant ships sailing in Mediterranean waters. The first squadron sent was under the command of Commodore Richard Dale. His command included the frigates USS Boston, USS Essex, USS Philadelphia and USS President as well as the sloop-of-war USS George Washington and the schooner USS Enterprise. During the squadron's deployment from 1801 to 1802, it operated by convoying merchant ships. Commodore Dale did not have orders to capture enemy vessels and could only respond to the North African's attacks if fired upon first or if coming to the aid of a merchant ship. On August 1, 1801, the twelve gun schooner USS Enterprise under the command of Lieutenant Andrew Sterett encountered the fourteen gun Tripolitan polacca named Tripoli. USS Enterprise captured Tripoli after a long and bloody fight but because the squadron could not legally make a prize of the ship, it was stripped of its fighting capabilities and released.

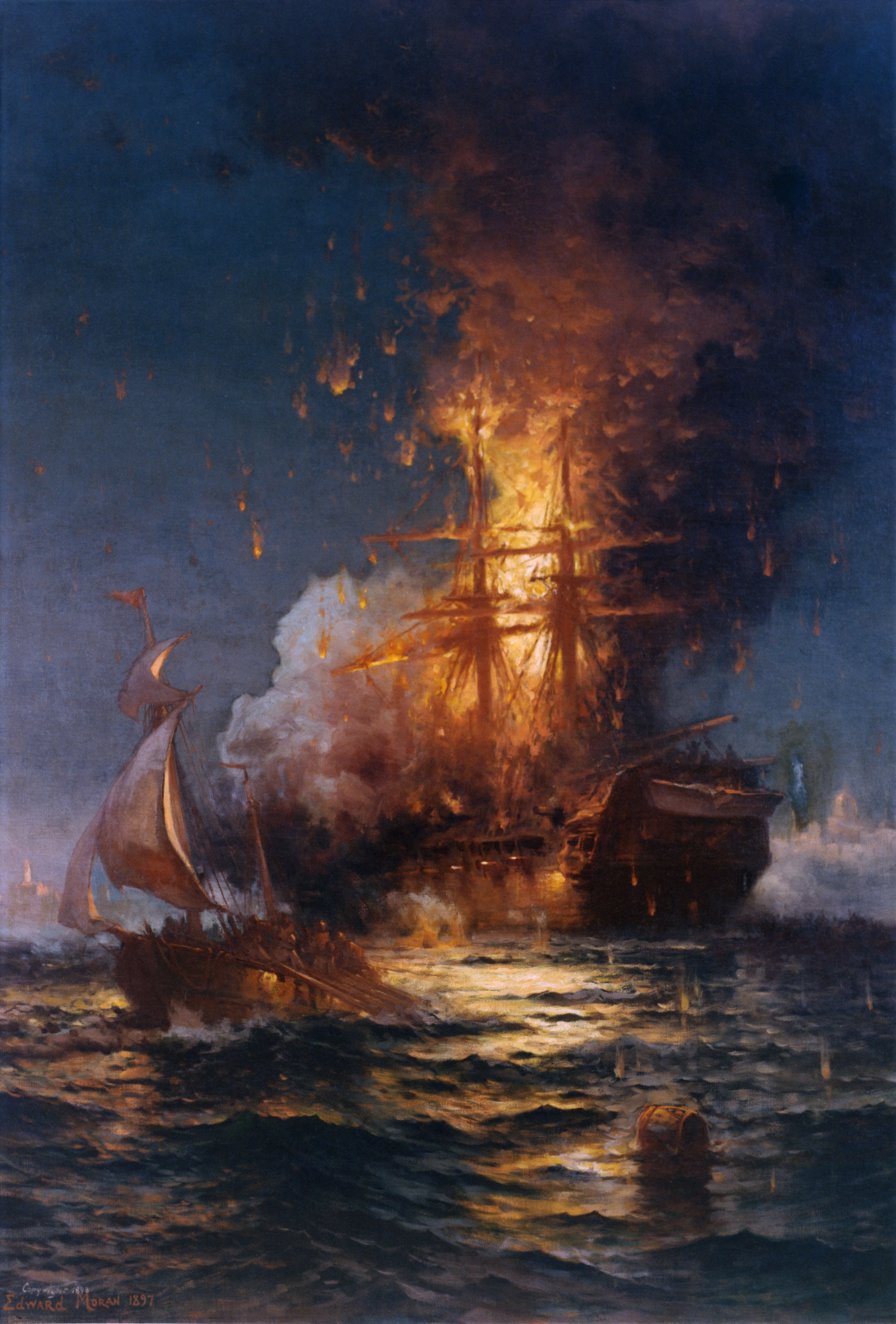
The burning of USS Philadelphia by the crew of USS Intrepid, 1804.

As attacks on merchantmen continued, the United States government eventually authorized the United States Navy to send a second squadron to blockade Tripoli and attack their ships. In May 1802 Captain Daniel McNeill in USS Boston assisted two Swedish frigates in a battle while blockading Tripoli. In the action several Barbary vessels sortied and the Americans and Swedish frigates fought off the attack which then forced the Tripolitans back into harbor. In June 1803, USS John Adams and USS Enterprise defeated nine enemy gunboats and a polacre near Tripoli. The polacre was sunk and the gunboats forced to flee, the Americans suffered no casualties. The second squadron returned to the United States in 1803 and that same year another force was sent and operated until 1804. On October 31, 1803, USS Philadelphia grounded on a reef just off Tripoli Harbor. Under heavy fire from enemy shore batteries the Americans attempted to refloat their ship but she was hard aground. When Tripolitan gunboats approached for her capture, her commander surrendered his ship and was made a slave along with the crew. Philadelphia was then manned by the Tripolitans as a sort of harbor defence until February 16, 1804. On that night Lieutenant Stephen Decatur in the ketch USS Intrepid boarded and recaptured Philadelphia and scuttled her by fire. This was the most remembered action in the battle for Tripoli. Decatur became famous immediately after this and had a long career of serving the American navy with distinction. He later commanded American forces during the Second Barbary War in 1815.

At the final engagement of the war in April and May 1805, the brig USS Argus, the schooner USS Nautilus and the sloop USS Hornet provided gun support for ten American marines and soldiers leading a mercenary army against Derne. During the battle the Mediterranean Squadron vessels under Oliver Hazard Perry bombarded the city while the land forces besieged the Tripolitan garrison. When the city finally fell, the Dey of Algiers surrendered and the First Barbary War was over.

=== Second Barbary War ===
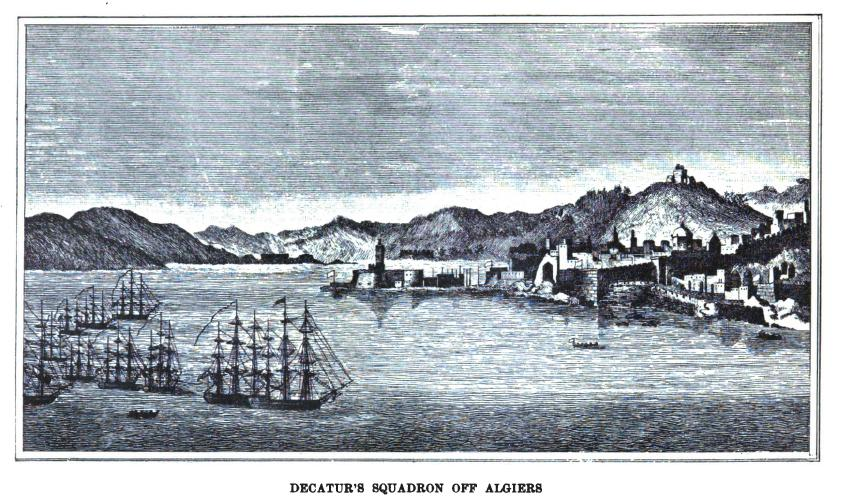
Stephen Decatur's Mediterranean squadron off Algiers in 1815.

The Mediterranean Squadron continued to operate until 1807. That year the squadron was withdrawn which tempted the Barbary corsairs to attack American ships again. It was not until the end of the War of 1812 in 1815 that the United States Navy resumed operations against the Barbary coast. Now a commodore, Stephen Decatur led the main squadron of ten vessels including the frigates USS Guerriere, USS Macedonian, USS Constellation, the sloops USS Epervier and USS Ontario, the brigs USS Firefly, USS Spark, USS Flambeau and the schooners USS Torch and USS Spitfire. A second force under Commodore William Bainbridge included the ship of the line USS Independence, the frigates USS Congress, USS Java and USS United States with eight smaller vessels but these warships did not see combat. Only two battles were fought during the Second Barbary War. Decatur's squadron captured the Algerian flagship Mashouda of forty-six guns off Cape Gata on June 15 and later defeated the twenty-two gun Estedio off Cape Palos on June 19. After, the squadron arrived at Algiers and prepared for battle but before fighting began the enemy surrendered and the short war came to an end.

== Ships of the Squadron ==
=== First Squadron ===
Commanded by Commodore Richard Dale. Deployed in 1801, and returned to the United States in 1802.

Name	Type	Guns	Captain
Boston	2nd class frigate	28 guns	Daniel McNeill
Enterprise	Schooner	12 guns	Andrew Sterett
Essex	2nd class frigate	32 guns	William Bainbridge
George Washington	Sloop of war	24 guns	John Shaw
Philadelphia	2nd class frigate	36 guns	Samuel Barron
President	1st class frigate	44 guns	James Barron

=== Second Squadron ===
Commanded by Commodore Richard Valentine Morris, and later Commodore John Rodgers, who took command after Morris was relieved of duty by the president for inaction—he was later recommended for a court martial, but the president declined to pursue the matter. Deployed in 1802, and returned to the United States in 1803.

Name	Type	Guns	Captain
Adams	2nd class frigate	28 guns	Hugh Campbell
Boston	2nd class frigate	28 guns	Daniel McNeill
Chesapeake	2nd class frigate	36 guns	Isaac Chauncey, James Barron
Constellation	2nd class frigate	36 guns	Alexander Murray
Enterprise	Schooner	12 guns	Andrew Sterett, Isaac Hull
George Washington	Sloop of war	24 guns	John Shaw
John Adams	2nd class frigate	28 guns	John Rodgers
New York	2nd class frigate	36 guns	James Barron, Isaac Chauncey

=== Third Squadron ===
Commanded by Commodore Edward Preble. Deployed in 1803, and returned to the United States in 1804.

Name	Type	Guns	Captain
Argus	Brig	16 guns	Isaac Hull
Constitution	1st class frigate	44 guns	John Dent, Thomas Robinson (Lieutenants acting as flag captain to Commodore Preble)
Enterprise	Schooner	12 guns	Stephen Decatur
Intrepid	Ketch	4 guns	Stephen Decatur, Richard Somers
John Adams	2nd class frigate	28 guns	Isaac Chauncey
Nautilus	Schooner	12 guns	Richard Somers, John Dent
Philadelphia	2nd class frigate	36 guns	William Bainbridge
Scourge	Brig	16 guns	John Dent, Ralph Izard
Syren	Brig	16 guns	Charles Stewart
Vixen	Schooner	12 guns	John Smith
N/a	two bomb-vessels		
N/a	nine gunboats		

In 1843, the squadron comprised four ships, Columbia, Cumberland, Fairfield and Plymouth.

== Commanders ==
	Name	Picture	Rank	Assigned (Orders)	Assumed (On Station)	Relieved (Orders)	Relieved (On Station)
1	COM Richard Dale (First Squadron)			May 20, 1801	July 1, 1801	April 1802	December 17, 1802
2	COM Richard Morris (Second Squadron)			?	May 25, 1802	June 21, 1803	September 11, 1803
3	COM John Rodgers (Second Squadron)			June 21, 1803	September 11, 1803	?	?
4	COM Edward Preble (Third Squadron)			May 19, 1803	September, 1803	1804	September 10, 1804
5	COM Samuel Barron (Fourth Squadron)			April, 1804	September 10, 1804	May 22, 1805	May 24, 1805
6	COM John Rodgers (Fourth Squadron)			May 22, 1805	May 24, 1805	?	May 27, 1806
7	COM Hugh Campbell (Fourth Squadron)			?	May 27, 1806	?	August 1807
	COM Stephen Decatur			?	June 14, 1815	November 15, 1815	June 1816
	COM William Bainbridge			1815	?	?	6 oct 1815
	COM John Shaw			?	6 oct 1815	?	November 15, 1815
	COM Isaac Chauncey			June 1816	September 1816	?	February 1, 1818
	COM Charles Stewart			?	February 1, 1818	?	November 1819
	COM William Bainbridge			?	November 1819	?	June 4, 1821
	COM Jacob Jones			?	June 4, 1821	?	1823
	COM John Creigton			?	1823	?	November 24, 1824

- Commodore Thomas MacDonough 24 Nov 1824 - 30 Apr 1825
- Commodore John Rodgers 30 Apr 1825 - 31 May 1827
- Commodore William Crane 30 May 1827 - 1828
- Commodore John Downes 1828-1829
- Commodore Matthew C. Perry Apr 1830 - Dec 1832
- Commodore Daniel Patterson Dec 1832 – Aug 1835
- Commodore Jesse D. Elliott Aug 1835 – 1838
- Commodore Isaac Hull 1838–1841
- Commodore Foxhall A. Parker Sr. 1841-1843
- Commodore Charles W. Morgan 5 Jan 1842 - 31 Apr 1843
- Commodore Charles Morris 10 Apr 1843 - 27 Mar 1844
- Commodore Joseph Smith 27 Mar 1844 - 17 Nov 1845
- Commodore George C. Read 1845-1847
- Commander Frederick Engle 7 Aug 1847 - 22 May 1848
- Commodore William Bolton 8 Jan 1849 - 20 Feb 1849
- Commander Frederick Engle 27 Feb 1849 - 17 Apr 1849
- Commodore John Gwinn 13 Apr 1849 - 25 Jul 1849
- Commodore Charles W. Morgan 25 Jul 1849 - 30 Jun 1852
- Commodore Silas H. Stringham 1 May 1852 - 1 Jul 1855
- Commodore Samuel Livingston Breese 7 Jun 1855 – 13 Jan 1858
- Commodore Elie A. F. La Vallette 12 May 1858 - 16 Dec 1859
- Commodore Uriah Phillips Levy 23 Feb 1860 - 19 Jul 1860
- Commodore Charles H. Bell 1 Aug 1860 - 12 Apr 1861
