= USS Essex =

USS Essex may refer to the following ships in American naval service:

- USS Essex (1799) was a 32-gun sailing frigate launched in 1799 and captured in 1814
  - Essex Junior was a British whaler captured by Essex and put into service until recaptured in 1814
- USS Essex (1813) was a planned Java-class frigate burned in the shipyard to prevent her capture during the War of 1812
- USS Essex (1856) was an ironclad steamer during the American Civil War, sold in 1865
- USS Essex (1874) was a wooden screw steamer launched in 1876 and sold in 1930
- USS Essex (CV-9) was an Essex-class aircraft carrier commissioned in 1942, which served through World War II, the Korean War, and Apollo 7 before being decommissioned in 1969
- USS Essex (LHD-2) is a Wasp-class amphibious assault ship commissioned in 1992 and currently in active service

== Other uses ==
- Essex (1799 whaleship), a whaler that a sperm whale sank
