= USS Raritan (1843) =

Sailing frigate, laid 1820, destroyed 1861

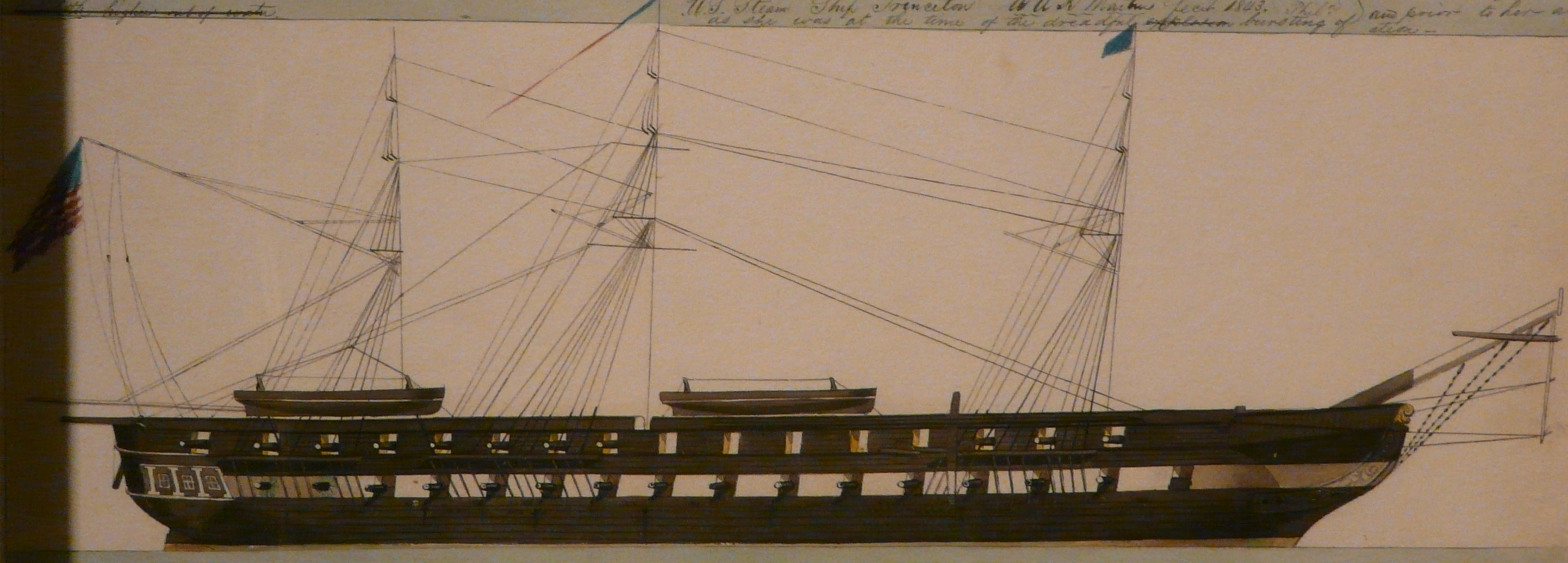
- Watercolor of USS Raritan from 1843 at the Independence Seaport Museum

History

United States
- Name: USS Raritan
- Builder: Philadelphia Navy Yard
- Laid down: 1820
- Launched: 13 June 1843
- Fate: Destroyed, 20 April 1861

General characteristics
- Class & type: Raritan-class frigate
- Tonnage: 1726
- Length: 174 ft 9 in (53.26 m)
- Beam: 45 ft (14 m)
- Draft: 22 ft 7 in (6.88 m)
- Propulsion: Sail
- Armament: 42 × 32-pounder guns; 8 × 8 in (200 mm) shell guns

The first USS Raritan was a wooden-hulled, three-masted sailing frigate of the United States Navy. During the Mexican-American War, she participated in the Blockade of Mexico and supported several amphibious landings across the eastern Mexican Coast. After the war, she served as the flagship for several squadrons before she was laid up in 1852. At the start of the American Civil War, she was destroyed by retreating Union forces to prevent her capture when Gosport Shipyard was captured by the Confederate States.

== Development ==
Of the original six frigates of the United States Navy, the three designed to carry 44 guns achieved early success during the War of 1812. In response, Congress authorized the construction of six additional 44-gun heavy frigates, which became known as the Java class in 1813. However, their wartime construction proved detrimental; in the rush to complete the ships quickly, the quality of materials and craftsmanship suffered. Only two vessels of the class entered service, both of which had short operational careers due to issues regarding their hurried development.

Four years later, Congress authorized the construction of nine additional frigates as part of a peacetime "gradual increase" of the Navy. In an effort to avoid a repeat of the Java class, the Navy emphasized a deliberate construction process, which allowed time to source high-quality materials and ensure quality craftsmanship. Congress did not allocate sufficient funding to complete all of the newly authorized frigates. Instead, the Navy adopted a strategy of constructing the ships nearly to completion, after which they were laid up in shipyards under protective structures. This approach was intended to preserve the hulls, as launching the ships prematurely would have led to rapid deterioration and would have been costly. The plan was to launch and complete each vessel in the event of war, thus retaining the quality vessels without the high cost associated with maintaining them during peacetime. The class would include Raritan and her eight sisterships. She was laid down at the Philadelphia Navy Yard in 1820, and was only launched on 13 June 1843.

== Service history ==
On 20 February 1844 the frigate, commanded by Captain Francis H. Gregory, cleared New York Harbor and sailed for the South Atlantic where she served as Commodore Daniel Turner's flagship until she returned to the United States in November 1845. Based at Pensacola, Florida, Raritan then operated with the Home Squadron as it blockaded the east coast of Mexico and supported Army forces during the war with Mexico. As Commodore David Conner's flagship, she joined USS Potomac in landing 500 men at Point Isabel to reinforce that military depot in May 1846. During 1847, she participated in the landings at Veracruz in March; at Tuxpan in April; and at Tabasco in June. Raritan then retired to Norfolk where she was laid up in ordinary during 1848. Active again in 1849, she served as flagship of the West Indies Squadron, then as flagship for the Home Squadron, and in 1850 was transferred to the Pacific to cruise between Panama and Cape Horn and as far west as the International Date Line. Raritan arrived at Valparaíso in June 1851. On 31 August, the British merchant ship Governor Davis ran aground in the Bogueron Passage. Attempts by Raritan to refloat her were unsuccessful and she was abandoned. Raritan returned to the United States in October 1852. On her arrival home, she was again laid up, in ordinary, at Norfolk. Raritan remained there until she was destroyed, 20 April 1861, by Union forces as they evacuated the navy yard.

== See also ==
- Union Navy
- List of sailing frigates of the United States Navy

== Bibliography ==
- Howard I. Chapelle, The History of the American Sailing Navy: The Ships and their Development (Norton, New York, 1949), p. 457, plan 29.
