= USS Montgomery (1776) =

Continental Navy frigate

History

United States
- Name: USS Montgomery
- Namesake: General Richard Montgomery
- Builder: Lancaster Burling
- Launched: 1776
- Fate: Burned, 6 October 1777

General characteristics
- Type: Frigate
- Armament: 24 guns

USS Montgomery was a 24-gun frigate of the Continental Navy. She was named in honor of fallen general Richard Montgomery who at the commencement of the American Revolution was an Irish officer who had sided with the Americans, later commissioned brigadier general by George Washington in the fall of 1775. Montgomery was later killed by British artillery during the failed American invasion of Quebec on 31 December 1775.

One of the first thirteen frigates authorized by the Continental Congress on 13 December 1775, Montgomery was built by Lancaster Burling at Poughkeepsie, New York and launched in late October 1776. Due to the British capture of New York City during the Battle of Long Island and the closing of the Hudson River, she was never completely finished and to prevent her capture and use by the British the frigate was burned on 6 October 1777.

== See also ==
- List of sailing frigates of the United States Navy

== Bibliography ==
- Shelton, Hal (1994). General Richard Montgomery and the American Revolution. New York: New York University Press.
