= USS Potomac (1822) =

19th-century U.S. sailing frigate

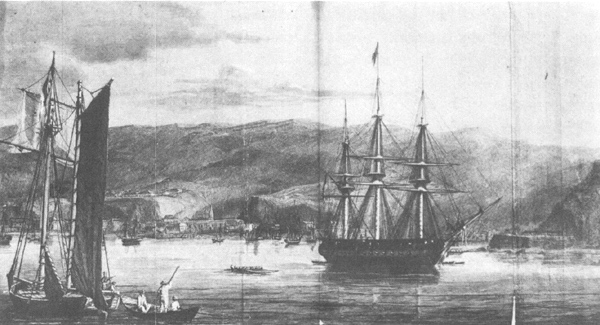
- USS Potomac

History

United States
- Name: Potomac
- Laid down: August 1819
- Launched: March 1822
- Commissioned: 1831
- Decommissioned: 13 January 1877
- Fate: Sold 24 May 1877

General characteristics
- Class & type: Raritan-class frigate
- Tonnage: 1,726
- Length: 177.83 ft (54.20 m)
- Beam: 46.17 ft (14.07 m)
- Draft: 20.5 ft (6.2 m)
- Complement: 480 officers and men
- Armament: 42 32-pounder guns, 8 8-inch "shell" guns

USS Potomac was a sailing frigate in the United States Navy. Although called a "44" 1st class, she was built to mount 32 carronades on her spar deck, 30 long guns on her gun deck, two bow and three stern chasers on each of these decks, significantly under-rating her on the rating system of the Royal Navy.

== Development ==
Of the original six frigates of the United States Navy, the three designed to carry 44 guns achieved early success during the War of 1812. In response, Congress authorized the construction of six additional 44-gun heavy frigates, which became known as the Java class in 1813. However, their wartime construction proved detrimental; in the rush to complete the ships quickly, the quality of materials and craftsmanship suffered. Only two vessels of the class entered service, both of which had short operational careers due to issues regarding their hurried development.

Four years later, Congress authorized the construction of nine additional frigates as part of a peacetime "gradual increase" of the Navy. In an effort to avoid a repeat of the Java class, the Navy emphasized a deliberate construction process, which allowed time to source high-quality materials and ensure quality craftsmanship. Congress did not allocate sufficient funding to complete all of the newly authorized frigates. Instead, the Navy adopted a strategy of constructing the ships nearly to completion, after which they were laid up in shipyards under protective structures. This approach was intended to preserve the hulls, as launching the ships prematurely would have led to rapid deterioration and would have been costly. The plan was to launch and complete each vessel in the event of war, thus retaining the quality vessels without the high cost associated with maintaining them during peacetime.

=== Construction ===
Potomac was laid down at the Washington Navy Yard in August 1819 and was launched in March 1822. However, she was not fitted out until 1831, when she was commissioned under the command of Captain John Downes.

== Service history ==
On her first overseas cruise, Potomac departed New York 19 August 1831 for the Pacific Squadron via the Cape of Good Hope on the first Sumatran Expedition. On 6 February 1832, Potomac destroyed the town of Kuala Batee in retaliation for the capture there in February of the previous year of the American merchantman Friendship, which had been recaptured and returned to Salem to report the murder of many of her crew. Of Potomac's 282 sailors and Marines who landed, two were killed while 150 natives died, including Mahomet, the chieftain. After circumnavigating the world, Potomac returned to Boston 23 May 1834.

The frigate next made two cruises to the Brazil Station, protecting American interests in Latin America from 20 October 1834 to 5 March 1837, and from 12 May 1840 to 31 July 1842. From 8 December 1844 to 4 December 1845, she patrolled in the West Indies, and again from 14 March 1846 to 20 July 1847 in the Caribbean and the Gulf. During this latter period, she landed troops at Port Isabel, Texas, on 8 May 1846 in support of General Zachary Taylor's army at the Battle of Palo Alto. She also participated in the siege of Vera Cruz, 9 to 28 March 1847.

Potomac served as flagship for the Home Squadron 1855–1856. At the outbreak of the American Civil War, she departed from New York City on 10 September 1861 for the West Gulf Blockading Squadron off Mobile Bay. At this time, William Thomas Sampson served aboard her until 25 December 1861 when he transferred to the USS Water Witch as executive officer. Black Nova Scotian sailor Benjamin Jackson also served onboard until he was reassigned to the USS Richmond. The Potomac became the stores ship for the squadron and remained at Pensacola Navy Yard as a receiving ship until 1867, when she was sent to Philadelphia. She remained at League Island Navy Yard until her decommissioning on 13 January 1877. She was sold to E. Stannard & Company 24 May 1877.

== See also ==
- Union Navy
