= USS Savannah (1842) =

US sailing frigate (1842–1883)

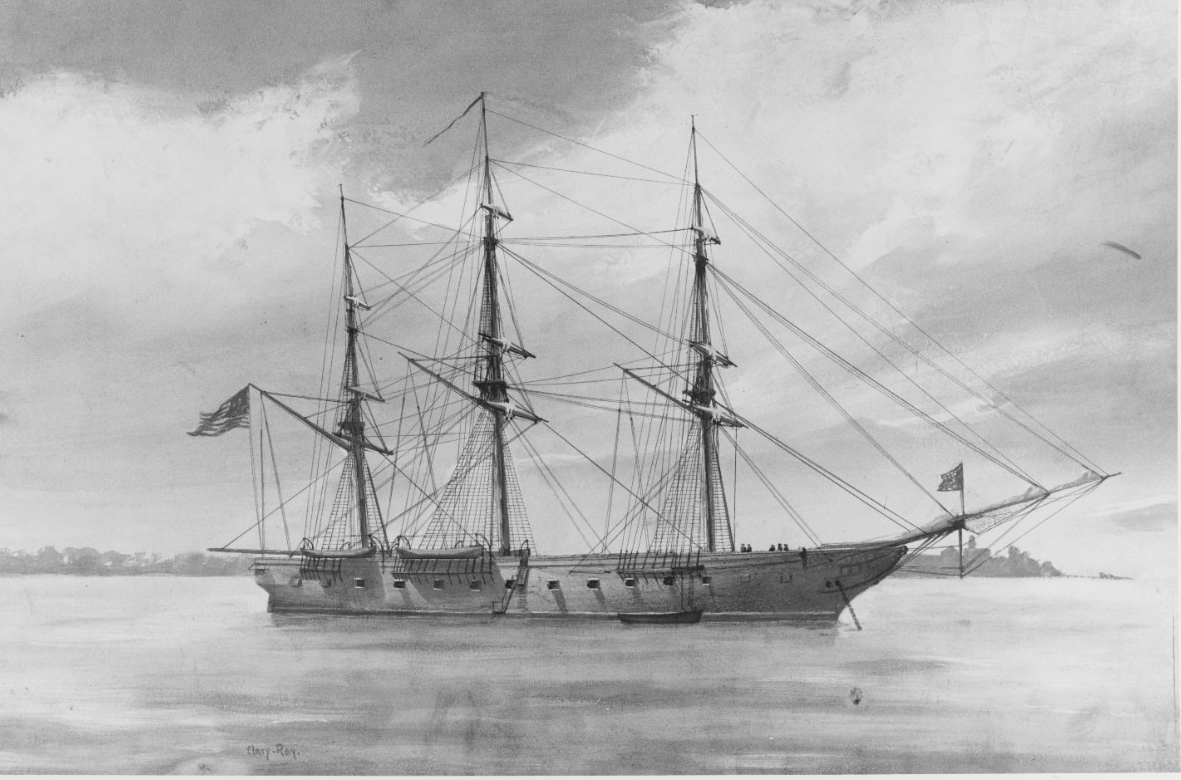
- Illustration of Savannah during the American Civil War as a sloop.

History

United States
- Name: Savannah
- Namesake: Savannah, Georgia
- Ordered: 1818
- Builder: New York Navy Yard
- Laid down: 1820
- Launched: 5 May 1842
- Decommissioned: 11 February 1862
- Out of service: 1870
- Fate: Sold, 1883

General characteristics
- Type: Potomac-class frigate
- Tonnage: 1,726 short tons (1,566 metric tons)
- Beam: 47 ft (14 m)
- Depth of hold: 22 ft 8 in (6.91 m)
- Propulsion: Sail
- Complement: 480 officers and enlisted
- Armament: As built: 4 × 8 in (20 cm) shell guns; 28 × 32-pounder guns; 22 × 42-pounder carronades; 1857: 2 × 10-inch (25 cm) Dahlgren guns; 22 x 8-inch (20 cm) and 32-pound (15 kg) cannons

USS Savannah was a Potomac-class frigate of the United States Navy. She was laid down in 1820 and intentionally left half-completed to preserve the hull in the event of an emergency. She was finally launched in 1842 and became the flagship of the Pacific Squadron in preparation for the Mexican-American War. During the war, she participated in several amphibious assaults in California. She led the squadron during the peaceful capture of Monterey and later tried to land marines to retake Los Angeles, although the operation failed. She then relieved a besieged American garrison at San Diego before sailing back to the United States.

For the next decade, she operated with the Pacific, Brazil, and Home Squadrons. In 1857, she was razeed to a sloop-of-war. During the American Civil War, she initially joined the blockade off Georgia and participated in the capture of two Confederate vessels. In 1862, she was decommissioned and operated with the US Naval Academy as a training ship until 1870. The ship was then laid up before she was sold off in 1883.

== Development and design ==
Of the original six frigates of the United States Navy, the three designed to carry 44 guns achieved early success during the War of 1812. In response, Congress authorized the construction of six additional 44-gun heavy frigates, which became known as the Java class in 1813. However, their wartime construction proved detrimental; in the rush to complete the ships quickly, the quality of materials and craftsmanship suffered. Only two vessels of the class entered service, both of which had short operational careers due to issues regarding their hurried development.

Four years later, Congress authorized the construction of nine additional frigates as part of a peacetime "gradual increase" of the Navy. In an effort to avoid a repeat of the previous issues, the Navy emphasized a deliberate construction process, which allowed time to source high-quality materials and ensure quality craftsmanship. Congress did not allocate sufficient funding to complete all of the newly authorized frigates. Instead, the Navy adopted a strategy of constructing the ships nearly to completion, after which they were laid up in shipyards under protective structures. This approach was intended to preserve the hulls, as launching the ships prematurely would have led to rapid deterioration and would have been costly. The plan was to launch and complete each vessel in the event of war, thus retaining the quality vessels without the high cost associated with maintaining them during peacetime. The class would include Savannah and her eight sisterships to form the Potomac-class frigates.

Savannah had a beam of 47 feet (14 m), depth of 22.6 feet (6.9 m), displacement of 1,726 short tons (1,566 metric tons), and a complement of 480. Her initial armament consisted of four 8 in (20 cm) muzzle loading guns, 22 42 lb (19 kg) carronades, and 28 32 lb (15 kg) cannons. While the exact measurements of each ship varied, her class had a length between perpendiculars of 175 ft (53 m). She was laid down at the New York Navy Yard in 1820, was launched on 5 May 1842, and named after Savannah, Georgia.

== Service history ==
=== Mexican-American War ===
In 1844, Savannah joined the Pacific Squadron to serve as flagship under the command of Commodore John Sloat. Over the next year, Mexican-American relations deteriorated rapidly. Following the annexation of Texas in 1845, Secretary of the Navy George Bancroft believed war was inevitable and positioned the squadron off the coast of California. Bancroft then ordered the commodore to either seize or blockade ports in the region once Sloat believed that a war had started. Between November 1845 and June 1846, Savannah was in Mazatlán, Mexico, to await news and use the city's large port. While the US declared war on Mexico on 13 May 1846, Sloat was cautious and slow to act due to a previous incident in 1842 when the Navy egregiously invaded Mexico based on incorrect news that a war was imminent. Despite not receiving official news about the declaration of war, he confirmed month-old reports of fighting on 7 June and sailed onboard Savannah to California. The frigate arrived on 1 July, and rendezvoused with the rest of the squadron off Monterey, which Bancroft recently ordered them to secure. The city was the capital of Alta California and the only port-of-entry for goods into the province.

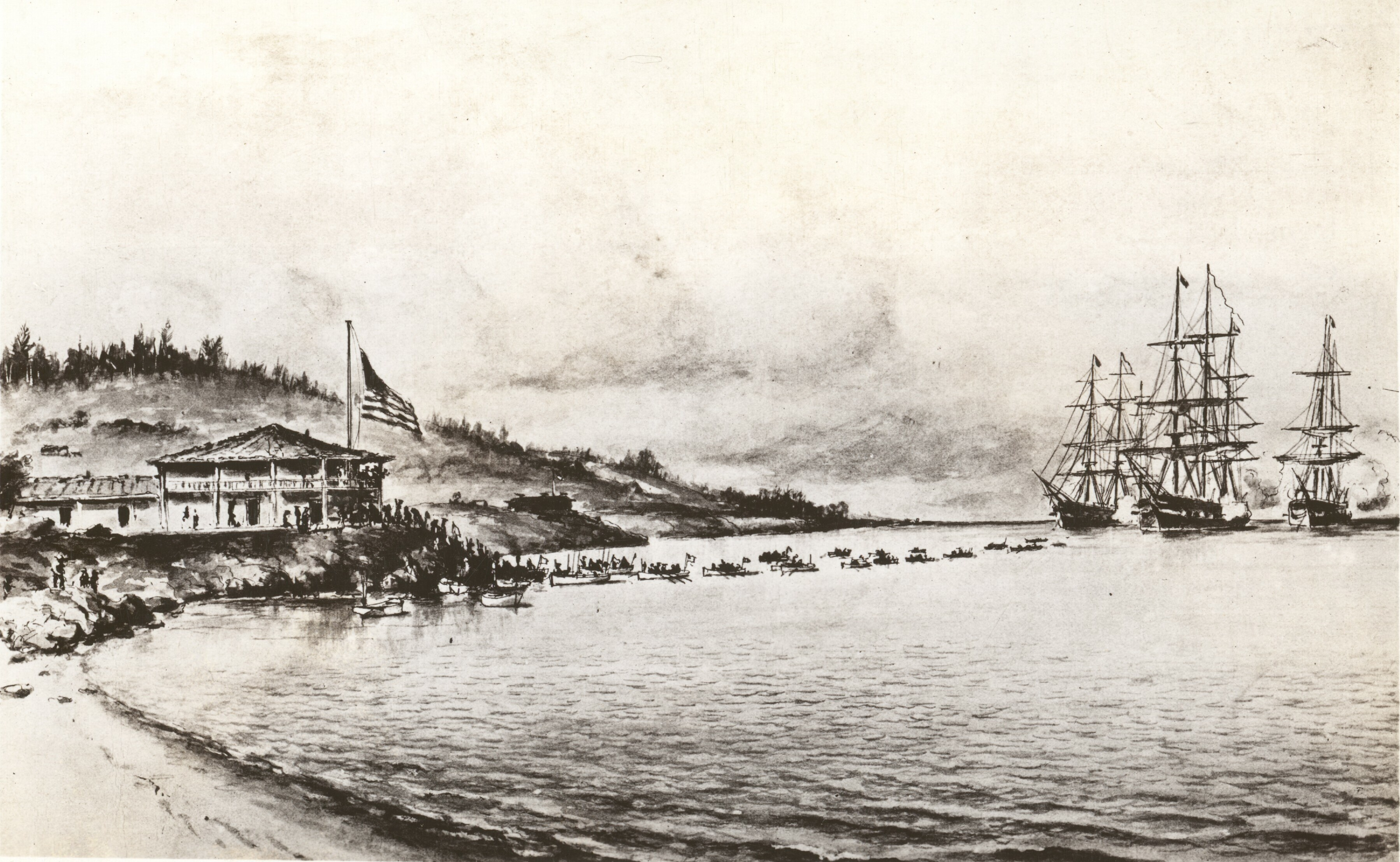
Savannah, Cyane and Levant (right) land marines at Monterey, who promptly captured the city.

==== Battle of Monterey ====
The squadron remained off Monterey as Sloat awaited an official declaration of war. He received news on 5 July that an Army force under John Frémont joined rebels against Mexican rule of California, and presumed that a war began. On the morning of 7 July, the American squadron requested Monterey to surrender. The Mexican commander refused, stating that he did not have orders to do so. At 9:30 am, Sloat ordered the city to be captured. Savannah, along with the sloops Cyane and Levant, sent a 250-man landing party ashore who captured the city peacefully by 11 am.

On 19 July, Frémont's forces reached Monterey and hoped to receive support from the Navy. Frémont and Sloat met, but the meeting went poorly as the commodore learned that Frémont acted without orders. Sloat left the meeting prematurely and choose to return to the United States, which left the fleet under the command of Robert Stockton onboard the frigate Congress. No longer the flagship, Savannah stayed at Monterey before she was sent to San Francisco in September. She was ordered to protect the area against a rumored Native American attack that turned out to be a misunderstanding with a local tribe.

==== Battle of Dominguez Rancho ====
That month, an American force led by Archibald Gillespie retreated from Los Angeles on board a merchant ship after being besieged by Californios rebels. After word reached the squadron in San Francisco, Savannah was dispatched to reinforce Gillespie's troops with her marines and retake the city. The combined American force landed at the city on 7 October, but the attack was called off the next day due to a lack of supplies, mounting casualties, little progress, and disagreements between Gillespie and Savannah's captain. The Americans retreated back to their ships. At least six crewmembers from the ship were killed in the failed expedition.

==== Relief of San Diego ====
On 26 July, Savannah and Congress sailed to reinforce San Diego which had recently been besieged by the rebels. The ships sent a landing party of marines, sailors, and Gillespie's force ashore. Stockton's squadron continued to resupply the garrison, which was able to recapture both San Diego and Los Angeles by the end of the year. The rebels then surrendered on 13 January 1847, thus ending the campaign.

=== Later service ===
In September 1847, Savannah left the Pacific and sailed to New York for repairs. She returned again to serve as the Pacific Squadron flagship between 1849 and 1852 and was then assigned to the Brazil Squadron between 1853 and 1856. After her return in 1857, Savannah was razeed to a sloop-of-war and had most of her spar deck removed. The Navy had lost enthusiasm for heavy frigates, and instead equipped ships with large but powerful Dahlgren guns that were much more effective than the older cannons. The remaining spar deck was used to mount two 10-inch (25 cm) Dahlgren guns mounted on pivots that provided a large arc of fire on the bow and aft. She retained a 22-gun broadside of 8-inch (20 cm) and 32-pound (15 kg) guns. The newly converted sloop was decommissioned while the work was performed, and recommissioned to serve as the Home Squadron flagship between 1859 and 1860 in the Gulf of Mexico.

=== American Civil War ===
Following the start of the American Civil War, Savannah was assigned to the Atlantic Blockading Squadron in July and stationed off Savannah, Georgia, to maintain the Union Blockade of the Confederacy. On 30 November 1861, she found the Confederate schooner E. J. Waterman aground near Tybee Island. The schooner was carrying coffee and cigars from Havana, Cuba to Edisto, South Carolina. While most of her crew already fled, Savannah captured four crewmembers who remained on board, including Waterman's captain. After the vessel was pulled free, a detachment from Savannah captured her and sailed her to Philadelphia. She was later credited with assisting in the capture of the British blockade runner Cheshire on 6 December, which was seized by Augusta in the same area. On 11 February 1862, Savannah was decommissioned and assigned to the United States Naval Academy as a training ship. She made four cruises with the academy, all between 1867 and 1870. After her last sailing to Europe, she was laid up at the Norfolk Navy Yard before she was sold in 1883.
