= USS Sabine (1855) =

American Civil War naval vessel

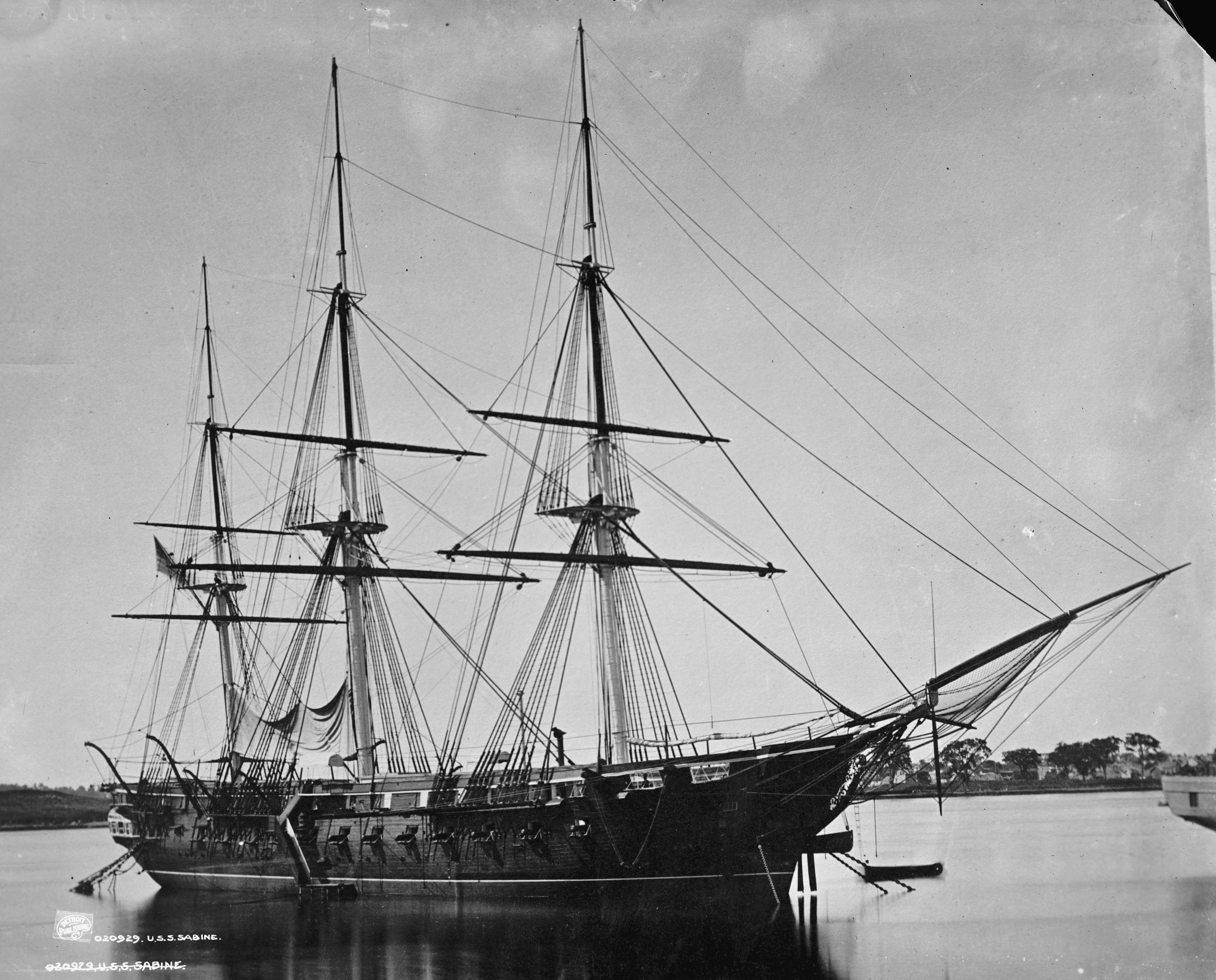
- Sabine at an unknown date

History

United States
- Name: USS Sabine
- Namesake: Sabine River
- Builder: New York Navy Yard
- Laid down: 1822
- Launched: 3 February 1855
- Commissioned: 23 August 1858
- Decommissioned: 1877
- Fate: Sold, 23 September 1883

General characteristics
- Class & type: Brandywine-class frigate
- Tonnage: 1726
- Length: 202 ft 6 in (61.72 m)
- Beam: 47 ft (14 m)
- Draft: 21 ft 6 in (6.55 m)
- Propulsion: Sail
- Speed: 12 knots (22 km/h; 14 mph)
- Complement: 400 officers and enlisted
- Armament: 44 to 50 guns

USS Sabine was a Potomac-class sailing frigate operated by the United States Navy between 1858 and 1883. Laid down in 1822, her construction was significantly delayed as the Navy had no immediate need or budget for the frigate. Launched in 1855, she was immediately outdated and was one of the last sail-only frigates launched by the Navy. Alongside her sister ship Santee, her hull was lengthened in a failed attempt to modernize the design. The two ships are sometimes known as the Sabine-class.

Her maiden deployment was with the Paraguay Expedition in 1858, although she was too large to sail up the Paraguay River and played a minor role. After returning to the United States, she joined the Union blockade during the American Civil War and was assigned to the Atlantic Blockading Squadron. She operated off Florida and South Carolina and partook in other Union operations, such as searching for Confederate blockade runners. At the end of the war, she was repurposed as a training ship before she was laid up in 1877 and sold off in 1883.

== Development ==
Of the original six frigates of the United States Navy, the three designed to carry 44 guns achieved early success during the War of 1812. In response, Congress authorized the construction of six additional 44-gun heavy frigates, which became known as the Java class in 1813. However, their wartime construction proved detrimental; in the rush to complete the ships quickly, the quality of materials and craftsmanship suffered. Only two vessels of the class entered service, both of which had short operational careers due to issues regarding their hurried development.

Four years later, Congress authorized the construction of nine additional frigates as part of a peacetime "gradual increase" of the Navy. In an effort to avoid a repeat of the Java class, the Navy emphasized a deliberate construction process, which allowed time to source high-quality materials and ensure quality craftsmanship. Congress did not allocate sufficient funding to complete all of the newly authorized frigates. Instead, the Navy adopted a strategy of constructing the ships nearly to completion, after which they were laid up in shipyards under protective structures. This approach was intended to preserve the hulls, as launching the ships prematurely would have led to rapid deterioration and would have been costly. The plan was to launch and complete each vessel in the event of war, thus retaining the quality vessels without the high cost associated with maintaining them during peacetime.

== Design and construction ==
The new Potomac-class frigates were based on the older Java design. The new ships had a length between perpendiculars of 175 ft (53 m), a beam of 45 ft (14 m), and a depth of 14.3 ft (4.4 m). They were rated to carry 44 guns, although the exact number and shot of each gun varied between each ship and over time. They displaced 1,726 tons 1,726 short tons (1,541 long tons) and had a complement of 480 sailors and officers.

The ships of the class entered service over a span of 40 years, with the first laid down in 1820 and the last commissioned in 1861. The long delay between their initial design and commissioning meant that the later ships were outdated by the time they were finished. Sabine and her sistership Santee were the last of the class to be launched. Sabine was finally completed in 1858, nearly 40 years after she was laid down. She was considered obsolete upon entering service and was one of the last sail-only warships of the Navy's inventory as the technology had been eclipsed by the steam engine. The Navy considered converting the two vessels into steamships, but instead chose to lengthen each ship by 15 ft (4.6 m). The two ships are sometimes are also known as the Sabine-class frigate.

== Service history ==
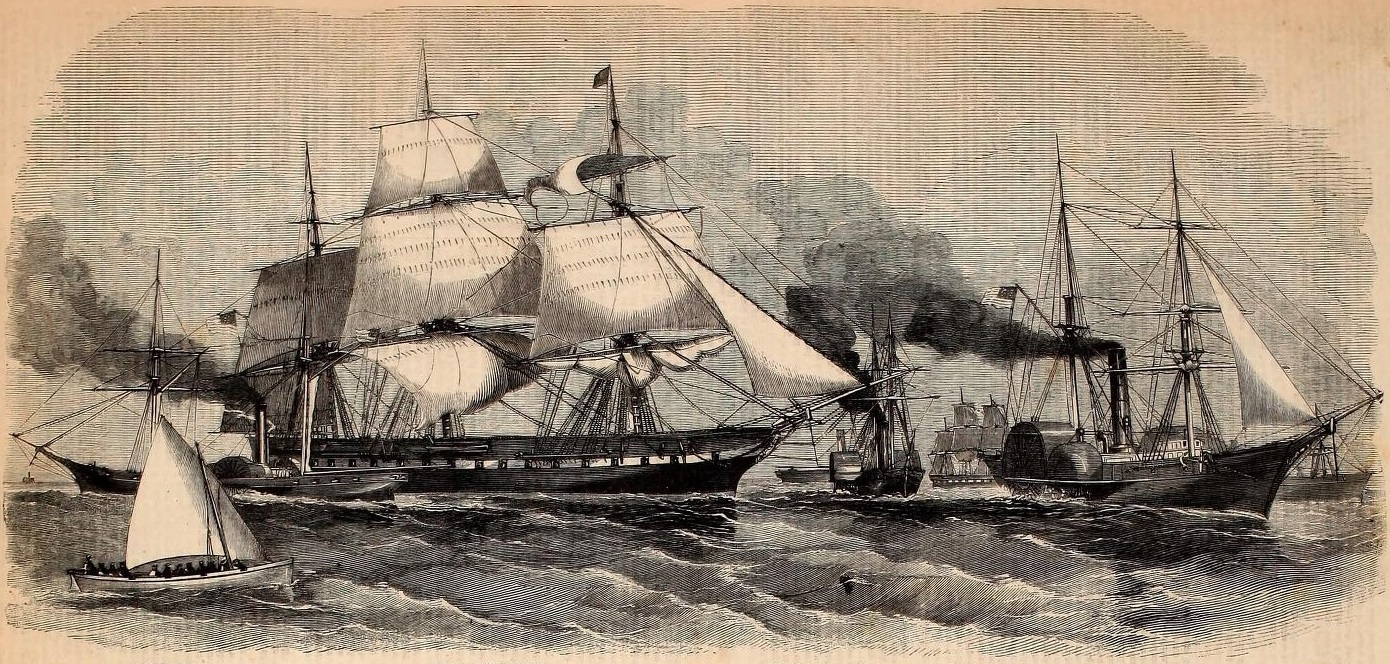
Ships of the Paraguay Squadron depicted in 1858. Sabine is front and center.

=== Paraguay Expedition and Home Fleet, 1858–1861 ===
Her first cruise took the frigate to Montevideo and Buenos Aires in October 1858 with the Paraguay expedition, a task force commanded by Flag Officer William B. Shubrick, after that country's firing on USS Water Witch. She conveyed Commissioner Bowlin and served as flagship during the voyage to South America, but was not officially considered part of the expedition fleet, as she was not designed to act against Paraguay, not being able to ascend the river. The expedition won the United States an indemnity and a renewed treaty. Sabine then operated out of New York with the Home Fleet until July 1861.

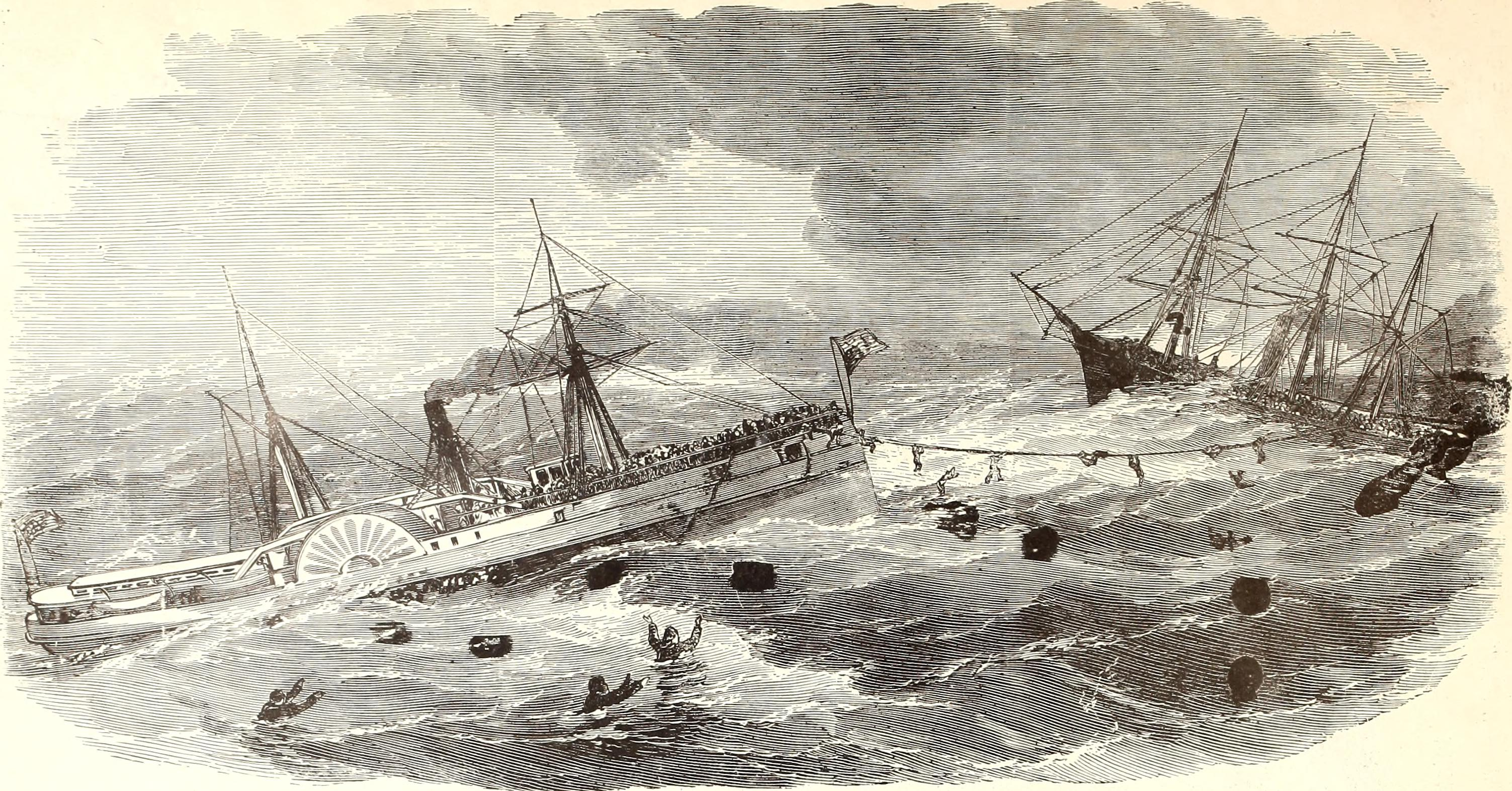
Sabine, right, rescues a battalion of marines from the foundering steamer Governor in 1861.

=== Civil War, 1861–1865 ===
Through July and August, she was out of commission at Portsmouth Naval Shipyard. Recommissioning on 30 August, she was ordered to join the Atlantic Blockading Squadron on 9 September.

During the Civil War, Sabine was actively employed along the east coast searching for Confederate raiders. She participated in the relief and reinforcement of Fort Pickens, Florida, in April 1861, under command of Capt. Adams; the rescue of 500 marines and the crew of chartered troop transport Governor during a violent storm off South Carolina on 2 and 3 November 1861; the search for Vermont in March 1862, after the ship-of-the-line had been badly damaged by a storm while sailing to Port Royal, South Carolina; and the hunt for CSS Alabama in October 1862 and CSS Tacony in June 1863.

Sabine returned to New York for blockade duty with the North Atlantic Blockading Squadron until ordered in August 1864 to Norfolk, Virginia as a training ship for Navy apprentices and landsmen.

=== Training ship, 1865–1877 ===
After the war, she was transferred to New London, Connecticut for the same purpose until 1868. In 1867, an apprentice on Sabine, Frank Du Moulin, was awarded the Medal of Honor for rescuing a crewmate who had fallen from the rigging into the water. In 1869 and 1870, the ship conducted midshipman training cruises to European and Mediterranean ports. In 1871 Sabine was repaired at Boston; and, from 1872 to 1876, she served as a receiving ship at Portsmouth, New Hampshire. In 1877, she was laid up until she was sold on 23 September 1883 at Portsmouth to J.L. Snow of Rockland, Maine.
