= USS Columbia (1836) =

Frigate of the US Navy

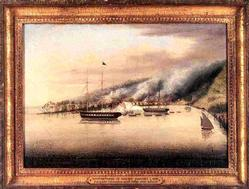
- Columbia and John Adams bombarding Muckie, Sumatra, 1 January 1839

History

United States
- Name: USS Columbia
- Builder: Washington Navy Yard
- Laid down: 1825
- Launched: 9 March 1836
- Maiden voyage: May 1838
- Fate: Burned, 21 April 1861

General characteristics
- Class & type: Raritan-class frigate
- Tonnage: 1726
- Length: 175 ft (53 m)
- Beam: 45 ft (14 m)
- Depth: 22 ft (6.7 m)
- Propulsion: Sail
- Complement: 480 officers and men
- Armament: 4 × 8 in (200 mm) smoothbore guns, 28 × 32-pounder (15 kg) guns, 22 × 42-pounder (19 kg) carronades

The first USS Columbia of the United States Navy to be commissioned was a three-masted, wooden-hulled sailing frigate, built at the Washington Navy Yard and carrying 54 guns (an earlier Columbia was destroyed during the burning of Washington in 1814 whilst it was still under construction). Her keel was laid in 1825, but as was typical of much Navy construction during this period, she was not launched until much later, on 9 March 1836.

On her first cruise, from May 1838 – June 1840 with Lieutenant George A. Magruder in command, Columbia rounded the Cape of Good Hope to become flagship of Commodore George C. Read in the East India Squadron. She returned to the United States by way of Cape Horn, becoming one of the first U.S. naval ships to circumnavigate the globe. She participated in the 1838 Second Sumatran Expedition in response to a Maylay attack on an American merchant vessel.

The Columbia served as flagship of the Home Squadron from January–May 1842; cruised on Brazil Squadron from July 1842 – February 1844 and in the Mediterranean Squadron from May–December 1844. She returned to the Brazil Squadron as flagship from November 1845 – October 1847, and was placed in ordinary at Norfolk Navy Yard upon her return home. Except for a cruise as flagship of the Home Squadron from January 1853 – March 1855, she remained at Norfolk until the outbreak of the American Civil War.

During her 1854-1855 cruise as flagship of the Home Squadron, the USS Columbia crew suffered repeated outbreaks of disease such as Smallpox, Cholera and Yellow Fever, see thumbnail image of 27 March 1855 petition from the frigate crew to Secretary of the Navy James C. Dobbin. Their petition complained of mounting mortally and illness, and requested their discharge. A separate report (exert below) of 19 March 1855, from Home Squadron Commander, Commodore John Thomas Newton to the Secretary Dobbin explained his decision to return to Norfolk Virginia and to seek medical care at the Naval Hospital for his crew.

"our recent trip to the unhealthy climate of San Juan and our :subsequent long cruise added to the debility produced by two summers :in the tropics, [illegible] our men for the reception of fever, and it :is not at all strange that the sickness should have made its :appearance on board - It is remarkable, however, up to our recent loss of seven men but three deaths have occurred on board the Columbia :since she has been in commission now over two years – There are at :present 50 sick men on board, many of whom will be immediately removed :to the Hospital ..."

The Navy Department previous experience in 1822 with an outbreak of Yellow Fever aboard the frigate USS Macedonian (1810) that killed 74 of the frigates officers and crew, revealed how quickly they devastated morale and operational efficiency. Secretary Dobbin notated his approval of Newton's request and had the sick crew men moved to the naval hospital Naval Medical Center Portsmouth.

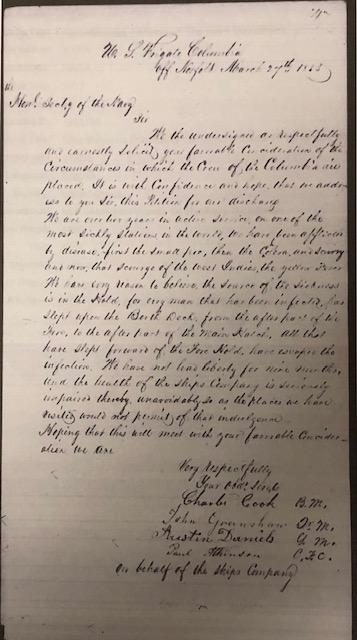
Crew of USS Columbia to James Dobbin requesting discharge after 1 yr on one of the most sickly stations in world, concerend about Yellow Fever, in West Indies Station also smallpox, and cholera

Columbia was scuttled and burned by Union forces to avoid her capture by Confederates upon the surrender of Norfolk Navy Yard on 21 April 1861. Following the close of the war she was raised and sold at Norfolk on 10 October 1867.

== See also ==
- Glossary of nautical terms (A-L)
- Glossary of nautical terms (M-Z)
- List of sailing frigates of the United States Navy
