= Frank Du Moulin =

United States Navy Medal of Honor recipient

- Born: c. 1850; Philadelphia, Pennsylvania
- Military career
- Allegiance: United States
- Branch: United States Navy
- Rank: Apprentice
- Unit: USS Sabine
- Awards: Medal of Honor

Frank Du Moulin (born c. 1850, date of death unknown) was a United States Navy sailor and a recipient of the United States military's highest decoration, the Medal of Honor.

== Biography ==
Born in about 1850 in Philadelphia, Pennsylvania, Du Moulin joined the Navy from that state. By September 5, 1867, he was serving as an apprentice on the training ship USS Sabine in the harbor of New London, Connecticut. On that day, a crewmate, Apprentice Eugene S. D'Orsay, fell from the rigging of the Sabine's mizzen-topmast into the water, striking the lower rigging and a boat davit on his way down. Du Moulin jumped overboard and rescued D'Orsay from drowning. For this action, he received the Medal of Honor the next month.

Du Moulin's official Medal of Honor citation reads:

On the 5th of September 1867, Du Moulin jumped overboard and saved from drowning Apprentice D'Orsay, who had fallen from the mizzen topmast rigging of the Sabine, in New London Harbor, and was rendered helpless by striking the mizzen rigging and boat davit in the fall.

== See also ==
- List of Medal of Honor recipients during peacetime
