= USS Cumberland (1842) =

US Navy sailing frigate, 1842–1862

Coordinates: 36°57′42″N 76°25′54″W

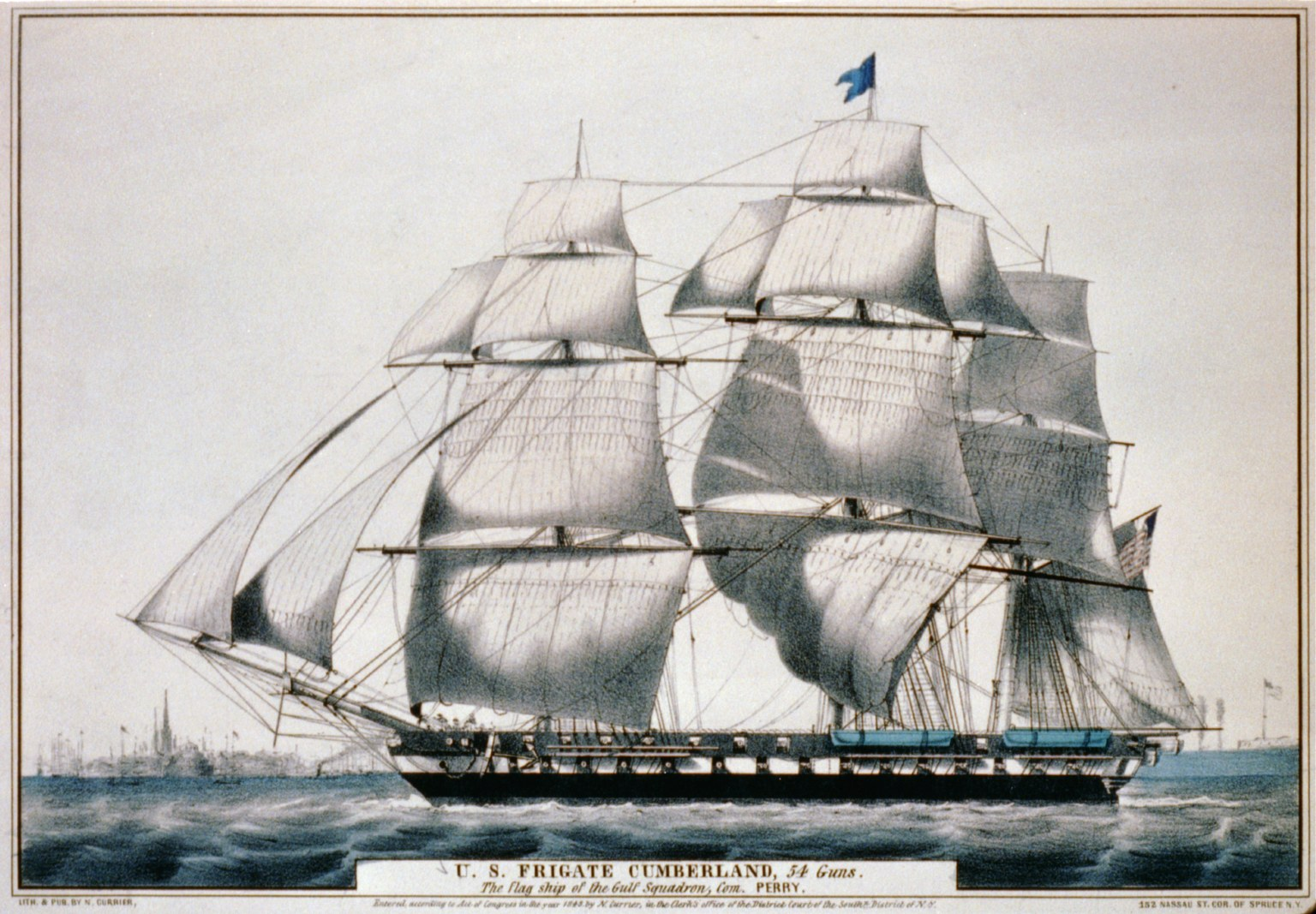
- USS Cumberland

History

United States
- Name: USS Cumberland
- Laid down: 1824
- Launched: 24 May 1842
- Commissioned: 9 November 1842
- Fate: Sunk 8 March 1862

General characteristics
- Class & type: Raritan-class frigate
- Tonnage: 1726
- Length: 175 ft (53 m)
- Beam: 45 ft (14 m)
- Draft: 21.1 ft (6.4 m)
- Complement: 400 officers and men
- Armament: 1842: 40 × 32 pdr (15 kg) guns, 10 × 42 pdr (19 kg) carronades; 1843: 36 × 32 pdr (15 kg) guns, 10 × 42 pdr (19 kg) carronades, 4 × 8 in (200 mm) "shell" guns; 1857: 2 x X-inch Dahlgren gun smoothbores on spar deck pivots, 20 IX-inch Dahlgren gun smoothbores; 1861: 1 x X-inch Dahlgren smoothbore fore spar deck pivot, 1 × "70-pounder" rifle on aft spar deck pivot, 20 IX-inch Dahlgren smoothbores

The first USS Cumberland was a 50-gun sailing frigate of the United States Navy. She was the first ship sunk by the ironclad CSS Virginia.

Cumberland began in the pages of a Congressional Act. Congress passed in 1816 "An act for the gradual increase of the Navy of the United States." The act called for the U.S. to build several ships-of-the-line and several new frigates, of which Cumberland was to be one. Money issues, however, prevented Cumberland from being finished in a timely manner. It was not until Secretary of the Navy Abel Parker Upshur came to office that the ship was finished. A war scare with Britain led Upshur to order the completion of several wooden sailing ships and for the construction of new steam powered ships.

Designed by famed American designer William Doughty, Cumberland was one a series of frigates in a class called the Raritan-class. The design borrowed heavily from older American frigate designs such as Constitution and Chesapeake. Specifically, Doughty liked the idea of giving a frigate more guns than European designs called for. As a result, he called for Cumberland and her sister ships to have a fully armed spar deck, along with guns on the gun deck. The result was a heavily armed, 50-gun warship.

== First Mediterranean cruise ==
She was launched on 24 May 1842 by Boston Navy Yard. Her first commanding officer was Captain Samuel Livingston Breese, and her first service was as flagship of the Mediterranean Squadron from 1843 to 1845 where she had among her officers men like Foote (who served as executive officer) and Dahlgren (who served as a flag aide to Commodore Joseph Smith). The ship sailed to several parts of the Mediterranean including Mahón (homeport for U.S. Navy ships operating in the Mediterranean at this time), Genoa, Naples, Toulon, Jaffa, and Alexandria. The cruise was largely uneventful, though there was a diplomatic scuffle with the Sultan of Morocco who refused to recognize the newly appointed American ambassador. The incident possibly was the result of the Sultan being misled by the outgoing American ambassador who did not want to leave his post. Smith cleared up the misunderstanding and the new ambassador assumed his duties. The most notable event was Foote's successful effort to ban the grog ration. He believed it was a grand success in turning sailors into harder working, upstanding men. It later became department policy in 1862 and it is still in effect to this day (with some exceptions.)

== Mexican–American War ==
As the ship was being made ready for a second trip to the Mediterranean, the Secretary of the Navy ordered the vessel to Mexico to assist in a show of force off the coast of Vera Cruz. Here she was flagship of the Home Squadron between February and December 1846, serving in the Gulf of Mexico during the Mexican–American War under the command of Cmdre. David Conner and Capt. Thomas Dulay. Capt. French Forrest later took command when Dulay fell ill. Other notable officers in this cruise were future Civil War rivals Raphael Semmes and John Winslow. The ship oversaw the blockade of the eastern Mexican coast for most of the war. She participated in several aborted attacks on Mexican ports, before running aground on 28 July off the coast of Alvarado. The ship was freed and her ship's company later participated in a raid on Tabasco. The grounding damaged her enough to force her to retire to Norfolk for repairs. Her crew, however, stayed behind and swapped ships with the crew of the sister frigate Raritan, which had been at sea for three years. The old crew participated in the Siege of Veracruz as part of the Naval battery.

Cumberland returned to Mexico just as a ceasefire was in place. Commodore Matthew C. Perry took over as flag officer from Conner. From Cumberland, Perry was instructed by the Polk Administration to assist settlers fleeing a major Mayan insurrection (known as the Caste War of Yucatán). Perry was also ordered to enforce the Monroe Doctrine and keep Spanish and English forces from interfering. With no realistic way to assist the settlers Perry partially ignored the order when Spanish warships arrived from Cuba loaded with guns, bullets, and money. Perry left the region when he read that the Treaty of Guadalupe Hidalgo had been ratified.

== Second Mediterranean cruise ==
Cumberland made her second cruise to the Mediterranean from 1849 to 1851. Notable officers on board during the second and third cruises to the Mediterranean included Louis M. Goldsborough, John H. Upshur, Silas Stringham, Andrew A. Harwood, John Worden (future commanding of officer of Monitor), and naval surgeon Dr. Edward Squibb (co-founder of the company now known as Bristol-Myers Squibb).

Cumberland's primary mission during these two cruises was to uphold American neutrality during a very turbulent period in European history by assisting American diplomats, merchants, and increasingly large number of American missionaries. The ship made visits to La Spezia (the U.S. Navy's new overseas homeport after being expelled from Port Mahon), Naples, Trieste, and Brindisi. At one point police in Naples boarded the ship based on a false rumor that Italian nationalist Giuseppe Garibaldi was on board. The ship also sailed to the eastern half of the Mediterranean and visited Athens, Beirut, and Alexandria.

== Third Mediterranean cruise ==
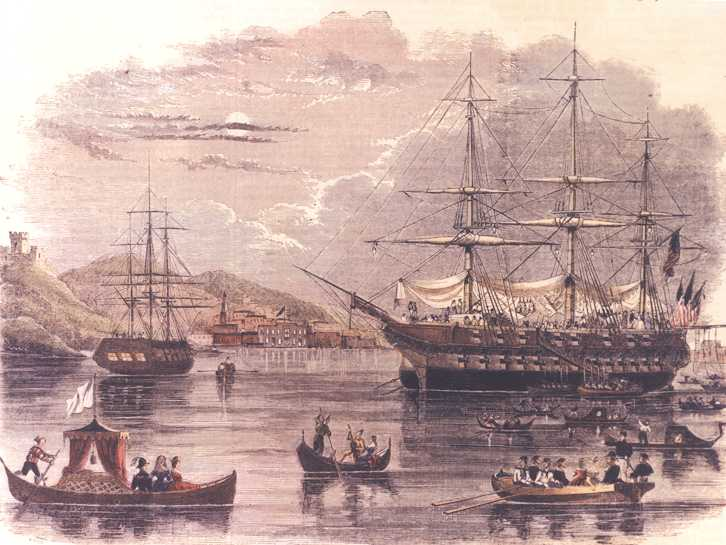
Cumberland holding a grand ball in the harbor of La Spezia, Kingdom of Sardinia, 1853

The third Mediterranean cruise departed from Boston on 8 May 1852. During the third cruise, the ship worked closely with diplomat and early environmentalist George Perkins Marsh who was serving as American ambassador to the Ottoman Empire. Marsh needed Cumberland's help in dealing with zealous Greek priests who were harassing American missionaries, notably Rev. Jonas King. Cmdre. Stringham and Marsh met with Greek monarch King Otto and stopped the harassment. Marsh needed Cumberland a second time when the powers of Europe were about to clash in the Crimean War. Stringham invited any American on board who felt they needed protection or assistance. Abd-ul-Mejid I, Sultan of the Ottoman Empire, invited Stringham and Marsh for an official visit to determine the position of the U.S. in a possible war with Russia. Both Stringham and Marsh expressed their sympathies to the Sultan but maintained American neutrality on the subject.

According to the autobiography of James Edward Watters (a crew member), during the third cruise of the USS Cumberland in the Mediterranean, while the Cumberland was at Constantinople, "the Turkish garrison, in firing a salute, by mistake fired a shotted gun, the shot striking the water not a great distance from our boat. The Commodore (Stringham) said to the Captain (Goldsberry), 'Put an Officer in a boat and send him ashore to ask whether they want that salute returned the way they gave.' the officer started but was met by an Officer (of the Turkish garrison) who apologized saying it was a mistake."

The third was long even by 19th century standards. Due to a lack of sailors to man a replacement ship, SecNav James C. Dobbin did not recall Cumberland until the ship had been at sea for three years. The ship returned home to the Boston (Massachusetts) Navy Yard (also known as Charlestown Navy Yard) in June, 1855.

== Conversion ==
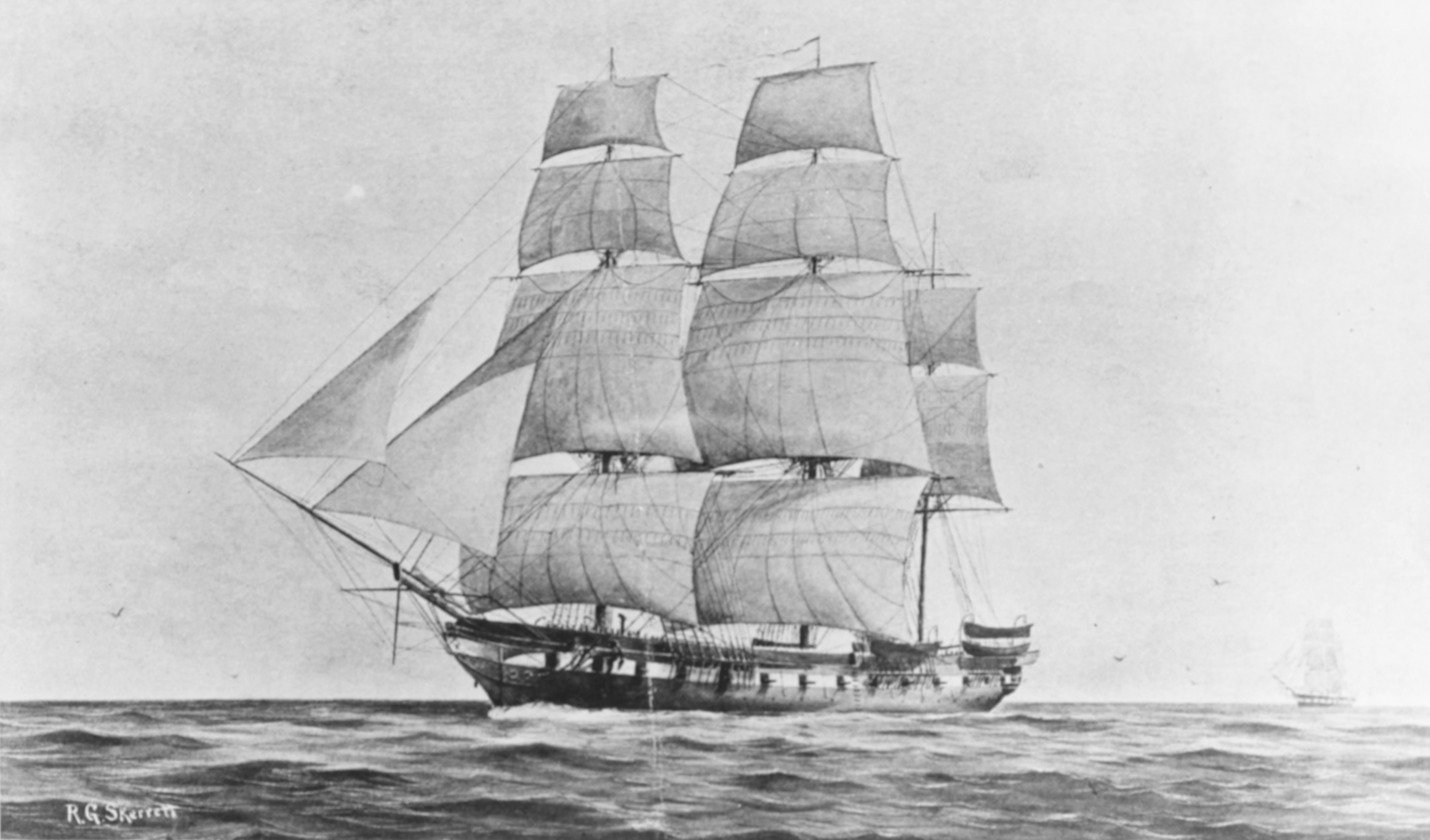
Depiction of Cumberland after her conversion from a frigate to a sloop of war.

From 1855 to 1857, Cumberland was razeed at the Charlestown Navy Yard in Boston. From his office in Washington, D.C., John Lenthall, the Chief of the Bureau of Construction and Repair, directed the changes to the ship. The Navy gave the vessel a completely new battery. On the spar deck, two X-inch Dahlgren gun smoothbores were placed, one at each end of the ship. On the gun deck, twenty IX-inch Dahlgren smoothbores were placed. By razeeing the ship, Cumberland got an extension of life. The Navy made her a lighter ship and thus slightly faster. Specifically, the shipyard workers removed the spar deck guns and lowered the bulwarks, decreasing the weight of the ship and reducing the crew and supply needs.

This move was assisted by the revolution in naval weapons that provided more powerful guns (and thus needing fewer guns). While steam powered ships were entering the fleet, there was still a need for all the sail ships. As late as 1860, Secretary of the Navy Isaac Toucey suggested that all Potomac-class frigates be razeed.

== Africa/slave trade patrol ==
From 1857 to 1859, she cruised on the coast of Africa as flagship of the African Squadron patrolling for the suppression of the slave trade. Like many U.S. Navy ships in Africa, Cumberland employed a number of Krooman (indigenous Africans who lived on the western coast) to serve as scouts, interpreters, and fishermen. The ship's surgeons had to deal with a number of issues, including an outbreak of smallpox.

Cumberland boarded several dozen merchant ships. Her crew almost seized one, the schooner Cortez, after shackles and known slave trading items had been found on the deck of the schooner, a slave trading holding pen had been spotted in the distance, the ship's papers were highly suspect, and the ship was far from any port. Cumberland's boarding officer, however, chose not to seize the ship possibly realizing the legal difficulty of bringing slave traders to trial without overwhelming evidence. Cortez was later captured by HMS Arrow in 1858 off the coast of Cuba.

Otherwise, the ship served as the squadron's supply vessel providing supplies to the other three ships in the squadron, the sloops-of-war Dale, Vincennes, and Marion and served as roving diplomat along the three thousand mile coast line.

== Home Squadron ==
After her return from Africa, Cumberland became flagship of the Home Squadron in 1860. She made a return trip to Vera Cruz, which was in the middle of a civil war. The Navy recalled her to Hampton Roads, Virginia when domestic issues in the U.S. took a turn for the worse.

== American Civil War ==
At the outbreak of the American Civil War, Cumberland was at the Gosport Navy Yard, with orders to monitor the situation in Norfolk and Portsmouth. After the attack on Fort Sumter, the ship's company was ordered to gather up or destroy U.S. Government property. This included several crates of small arms and possibly (not yet confirmed) gold from the U.S. Customs House in Norfolk. The company was also ordered to spike all 3,000 guns at the Navy Yard within just a few hours. This latter task was impossible, given that only 100 sailors were assigned to the task. Sailors from the Yard and the barracks ship Pennsylvania boarded Cumberland as a part of the evacuation.

She was towed out of the Yard by the tug Yankee, assisted by the steam sloop Pawnee, escaping destruction when other ships there were scuttled and burned by Union forces on 20 April 1861 to prevent their capture. She sailed back to Boston for repairs. The aft 10-inch shell gun was removed and replaced with what many officers referred to as a 70-pounder rifle. This gun did not exist in the Navy's inventory at the time. It was possibly a 5.3 in (130 mm), 60 pdr (27 kg) Parrott rifle.

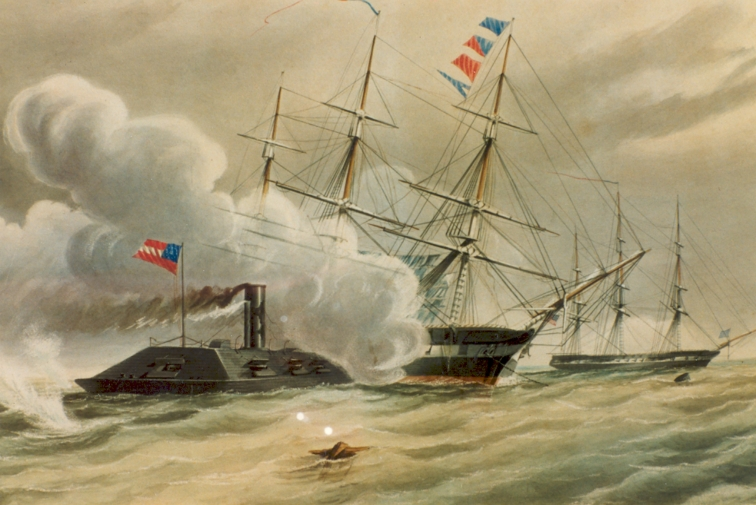
CSS Virginia ramming and sinking Cumberland, 1862.

She sailed back to Hampton Roads and took up station as a blockader, serving in the North Atlantic Blockading Squadron until 8 March 1862. The sloop-of-war engaged Confederate forces in several minor actions in Hampton Roads and captured many small ships in the harbor. Additionally, Cumberland was a part of the expedition that captured the forts at Cape Hatteras.

Cumberland was rammed and sunk in an engagement with the Confederate ironclad CSS Virginia (formerly USS Merrimack) at Newport News, Virginia on 8 March 1862. The engagement known as the first day of the Battle of Hampton Roads between the two ships is considered to be a turning point in the history of world naval affairs as it showed the advantage of steam-powered, armored ships over sail-powered wooden-hulled ships. Because of Cumberland, Virginia lost two of her guns, her ram, and suffered some internal damage. Congress later recognized that Cumberland did more damage to Virginia than the U.S. Navy's ironclad Monitor, which did battle with Virginia the next day.

One of the men who died aboard Cumberland was Navy chaplain John L. Lenhart, a Methodist minister. He was the first Navy chaplain to lose his life in battle.

The battle with Virginia was commemorated in a poem On Board the Cumberland that was illustrated by F. O. C. Darley, and in the song Cumberland's Crew printed in 1865 but author unknown. That song inspired a century of folk songs of the same or similar names, such as Cumberland and the Merrimac.

== Salvage ==
Following the sinking of the Cumberland, the federal government almost immediately solicited work from salvage companies to secure valuable items from the shipwreck.

In his memoir, When the Yankees Came, Virginia resident George Benjamin West described some post-war work on Cumberland:

After the war ... I have very often been on the boats that worked on the Cumberland, first by a German named West and then by a company of Detroit, Michigan, which purchased her from West and which brought down a great many of the [Great] Lakes divers to try to secure the $40,000 in gold said to be in an iron chest in the paymaster's stateroom. ... ... His [the German diver West's] plan, as told to me, was to start under the stern, which lay down the river, and blow a hole in her and work towards the paymaster's stateroom. He did the diving himself and did not attempt to get any wreckage save the pieces he blew out of the side and brought up on deck, and the copper bolts cut out. The difficulty he had was the foiling-in of mud and sand, and having to grope in the utter darkness. It was very dangerous, and several times he was brought up unconscious.

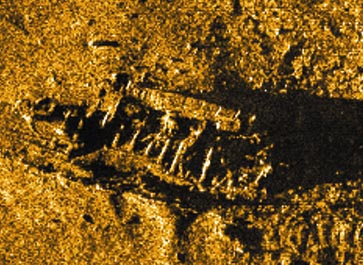
Cumberland wreck. Image taken by a joint U.S. Navy/National Oceanic and Atmospheric Administration (NOAA) expedition.

Occasional salvage of the shipwrecks continued into the early 20th century. In 1909, part of Cumberland's anchor chain was recovered and sent to the museum of the Confederacy in Richmond (Newport News Daily Press, 12 November 1909).

In 1981, the National Underwater and Marine Agency (NUMA) contracted with Underwater Archaeological Joint Ventures (UAJV), a private firm based in Yorktown, Virginia. UAJV team members consulted local watermen (whose oyster dredges had picked up artifacts for years) to help locate the ships. This information and a remote sensing survey led archaeologists to two significant wrecks. The recovery of numerous artifacts confirmed that these shipwrecks were most likely Cumberland and CSS Florida. Artifacts recovered included fasteners, fittings, apothecary vessels, a ship's bell (from Cumberland), cannon fuses and other ordnance items. The artifacts proved the NUMA/UAJV team had indeed found Cumberland and Florida. Most of the artifacts from this NUMA/UAJV excavation are on exhibit at the Hampton Roads Naval Museum in Norfolk, VA (Newport News Daily Press, 8 March 1987).

== Cumberland today ==
Cumberland is currently a shipwreck under the protection of several Federal laws, including the Sunken Military Craft Act of 2005, the Abandoned Shipwreck Act of 1987, and the Territorial Clause of the U.S. Constitution (which gives the U.S. Government exclusive rights to its own property). Federal courts have upheld these laws and the U.S. Government's exclusive rights to its own ships.

Since her sinking, the ship has been the subject of many expeditions. Some of these expeditions have been in violation of Federal law and artifacts were seized by Federal agents. Many artifacts from these expeditions (both legal and illegal) are at the Hampton Roads Naval Museum.

The wreck is facing west to east, with the bow of the vessel slightly above the floor of Hampton Roads.

== Gallery ==
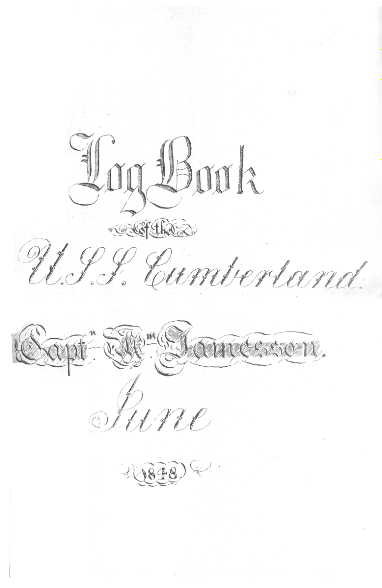
Cover of USS Cumberland log book, 1848

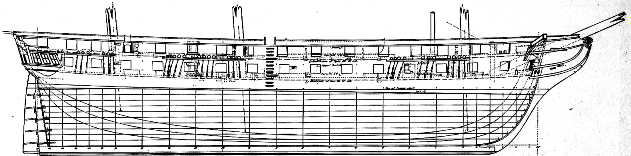
Drawing of hull plan of USS Cumberland as a frigate

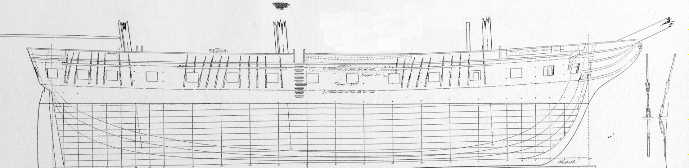
Drawing of USS Cumberland after being razeed

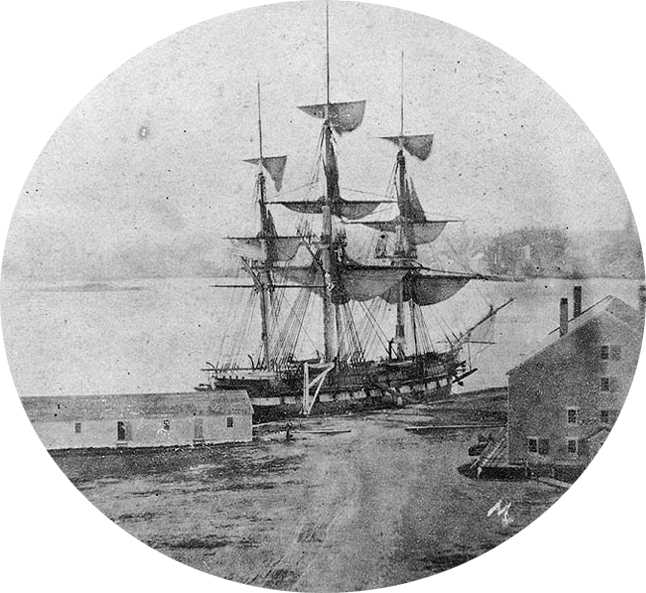
USS Cumberland at the Portsmouth Navy Yard, 1859

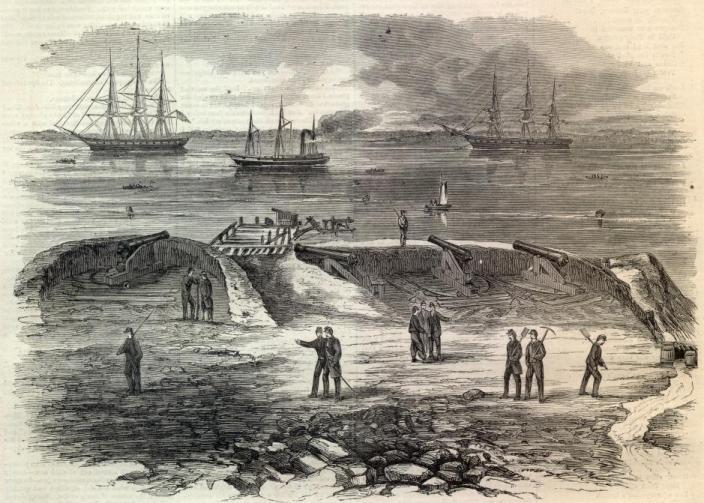
USS Cumberland (right) with the frigate USS Congress at Newport News Point, 1862

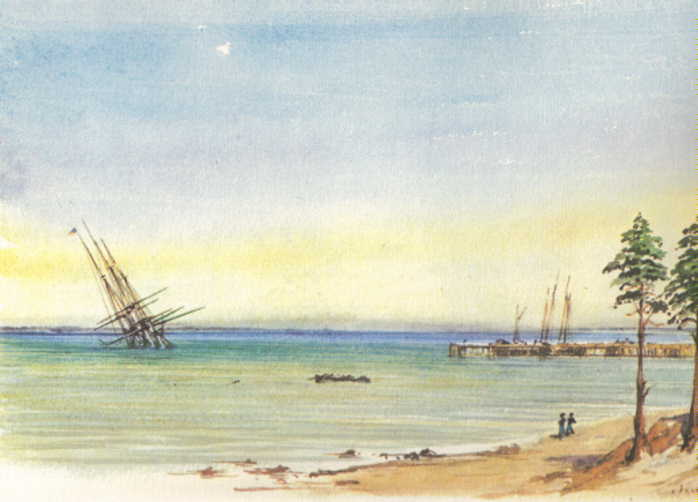
Wreck of USS Cumberland, 1862

== See also ==
- List of sailing frigates of the United States Navy
- Naval tactics in the Age of Sail
