= USS Java =

American sailing frigate

History

United States
- Name: Java
- Namesake: HMS Java
- Ordered: 5 January 1813
- Builder: Flannigan and Parsons, Baltimore
- Laid down: 1813
- Launched: 4 January 1814
- Commissioned: August 1815

General characteristics
- Type: Heavy frigate
- Tonnage: 1,508 short tons (1,368 t)
- Length: LBP: 175 ft (53 m)
- Beam: 44 ft 6 in (13.56 m)
- Draft: 13 ft 8 in (4.17 m)
- Complement: 400
- Armament: 33 × 24 lb (11 kg) long guns; 20 × 42 lb (19 kg) carronades

USS Java was a Java-class heavy frigate of the United States Navy. She was ordered during the War of 1812, and despite a hastened construction, was not completed in time to fight in the war. She was completed in 1815 and made two deployments to the Mediterranean. The first, between 1815 and 1817, was immediately after the Second Barbary War and the second was between 1827 and 1831. Her rushed construction was an issue throughout service and attempts to address the problem were undertaken after her return in both instances. In 1831, she was reduced to a receiving ship and broken up in 1842.

== Design and development ==
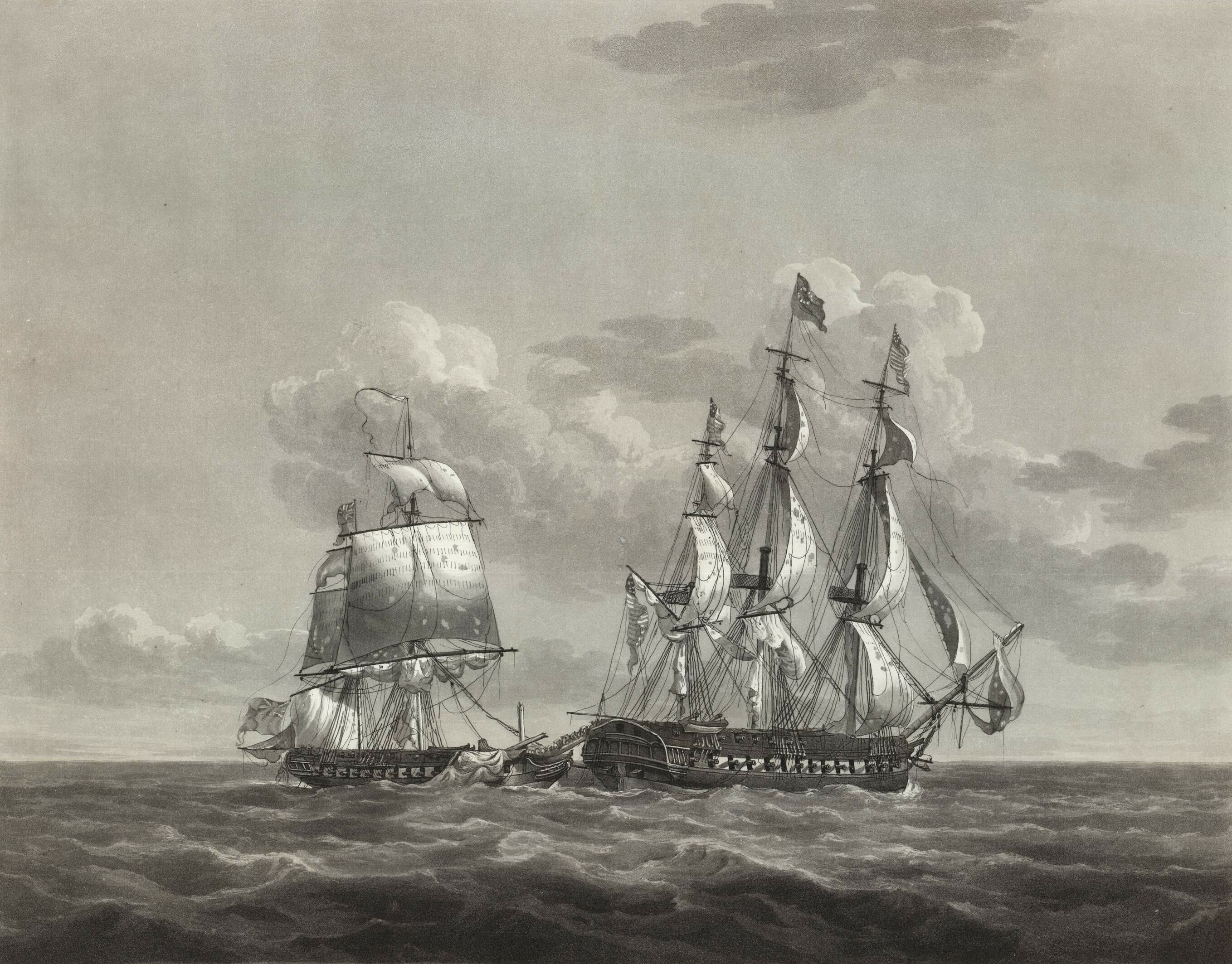
USS Constitution capturing HMS Java; the engagement served as the namesake for USS Java.

Under the Jefferson Administration in the early 1800s, the US Navy was envisioned as a militia-based force that operated small gunboats to protect the American coast, instead of ocean-going warships that could meet an enemy at sea. Congress opposed expanding the Navy, but reversed course at the start of the War of 1812. On 5 January 1813, the legislature ordered six Java-class frigates, which constituted the first purpose-built frigates for the US Navy since 1800. The ships were designed by William Doughty and based on the 44-gun variant of the original six frigates developed by Joshua Humphreys. Humphreys believed the Navy would be outnumbered against an enemy navy. To compensate, he designed heavy frigates armed with powerful 24 lb (11 kg) cannons that could defeat a traditional frigate in a one-on-one engagement while outmaneuvering larger ships of the line.

Doughty slightly modified the design to feature a fuller hull, greater buoyancy, strengthened spar deck, and improved sailing ability. The class featured a length between perpendiculars of 175 feet (53 m), beam of 44 feet 6 inches (13.56 m), draft of 13 feet 8 inches (4.17 m) and armed with thirty-three 24 lb (11 kg) long guns on the main deck and twenty 42 lb (19 kg) carronades on the forecastle and quarterdeck. The ships had a compliment of 400, displacement of 1,508 short tons (1,368 t), were plainly finished and lacked figureheads. Three were laid down—Columbia, Guerriere, and Java—with the last two named after British ships defeated by USS Constitution in the opening months of the war. They were also the only ships in the class to be launched, as Columbia was burned in 1814 to avoid capture as British forces seized Washington, D.C.. Construction of Java was contracted to the shipyard of Flannigan and Parsons in Baltimore. War-time work was rushed and incorporated substandard material that rapidly decayed and limited the ships' service life.

== Service history ==
Java was laid down in 1813 and launched on 4 January 1814. She was in Baltimore harbor during the bombardment of Fort McHenry and her presence was known to the Royal Navy, although she was out of range. The frigate was completed after the war had ended, although the British blockade of the Chesapeake Bay would have prevented her from sailing to sea if she was finished in time. She was assigned to the Barbary Expedition of 1815, but delays in fitting her out prevented the ship from joining the fleet. She was commissioned in August 1815 with Captain Oliver Hazard Perry in command, ordered to join the Mediterranean Squadron. The ship left Baltimore on 5 August, stopped at Hampton Roads and New York for extra rigging, and arrived at Newport, Rhode Island for further crew members. She left for the Mediterranean on 22 January 1816 during a severe storm which collapsed one of her masts, killing five. In April, she was off the coast of Algiers so Perry could go ashore to meet with the dey to reiterate the Treaty with Algiers after Berber pirates failed to comply. Alongside Constellation, Ontario, and Erie, the ships then showed the flag in Tripoli; afterwards, Java continued on a cruise of the Mediterranean and returned to Newport in early 1817.

During the voyage, Perry identified issues with her construction. He described Java as, "Not appear[ing] to have been faithfully built, the work in many respects is bad", such as sloppy caulking and defects in the wales. The ship was laid up in Boston in February, and efforts to repair the ship were delayed. Commodore Isaac Hull stated she was ready to deploy again in 1819, although she only returned to service in 1827. The ship returned to the Mediterranean under Captain William M. Crane to protect American interests and perform diplomatic duties, such as a 1831 visit to Monrovia to demonstrate American support for the Colony of Liberia. For part of the cruise, she served as Commodore James Biddle's flagship of the squadron, and returned to the United States in 1831. She was laid up at Norfolk, Virginia, and in 1832, Congress authorized funds to rebuild the ship. Work never began, and she was instead used as a receiving ship in the port. The Board of Navy Commissioners declared Java unfit for service by 1836, and she was broken up in 1842 after spending only about five years in active service.

== Sources ==
- Berube, Claude G. (2021). On Wide Seas: the US Navy in the Jacksonian Era. University of Alabama Press. ISBN 978-0-8173-9377-9.
- Canney, Donald L. (2001). Sailing Warships of the US Navy. London: Chatham. ISBN 978-1-86176-110-1.
- Chapelle, Howard Irving (1949). The History of the American Sailing Navy: The Ships and Their Development. New York: Bonanza Books.
- "Java". Dictionary of American Naval Fighting Ships. Naval History and Heritage Command. 22 June 2005.
- Lardas, Marchk (2003). American Heavy Frigates (1794–1826). Osprey Publishing. pp. 10–12. ISBN 978-1841766300.
- Silverstone, Paul H. (2001). The Sailing Navy, 1775–1854. U.S. Navy Warship Series (Nachdr. ed.). Annapolis, Maryland: Naval Institute Press. ISBN 978-1-55750-893-5.
- Snow, Peter (2014). When Britain burned the White House: The 1814 invasion of Washington. New York: Dunne Books. ISBN 978-1-84854-611-0.
