= Potomac-class frigate =

American sailing frigates (1819–1912)

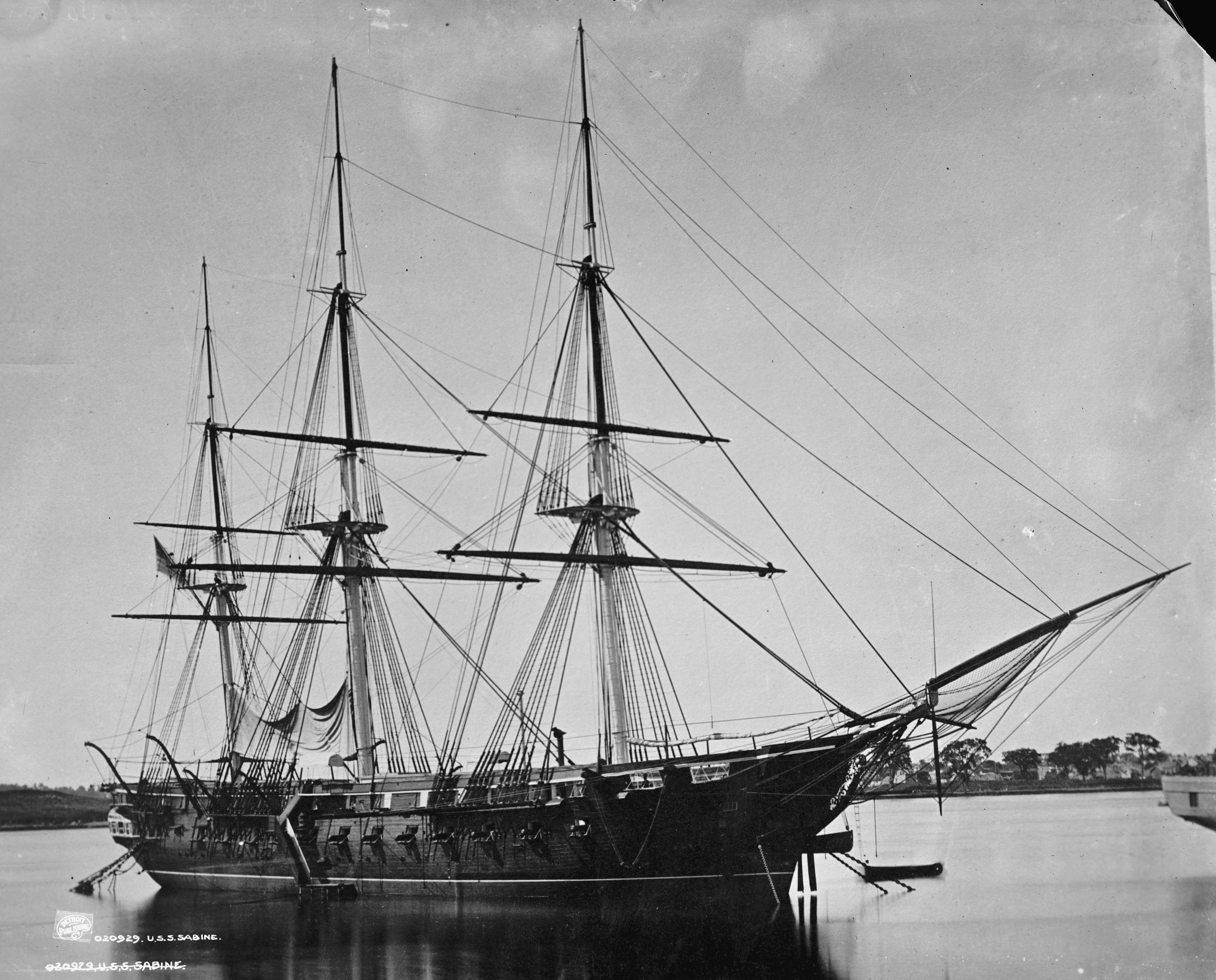
- USS Sabine, one of the two lengthened ships.

Class overview
- Name: Potomac class
- Builders: Washington Navy Yard; Boston Navy Yard; Philadelphia Navy Yard; Norfolk Navy Yard; New York Navy Yard; Portsmouth Navy Yard
- Operators: United States Navy
- Preceded by: Java-class frigate
- Built: 1819–1861
- In service: 1825–1912
- Completed: 9
- Lost: 4
- Retired: 5

General characteristics
- Class & type: Heavy sailing frigate
- Displacement: 1,726 short tons (1,541 long tons)
- Length: 175 ft (53 m) lbp
- Beam: 45 ft (14 m)
- Depth: 14.3 ft (4.4 m)
- Propulsion: Sails
- Complement: 480
- Armament: 44 guns of various shot nominally

The Raritan or Potomac-class frigate was a class of nine heavy United States Navy frigates which were in operation through much of the 19th century. The ships were intended to be constructed slowly for the sake of build quality, and entered service between the 1820s and 1860s due to a lack of funding. The design was based on the prior original six frigates of the United States Navy and Java-class frigates, but had become outdated by the time the last ships of the class entered service. They served in various conflicts, most notably the Mexican-American War and American Civil War. By the end of the latter, four members of the class had been sunk and those remaining were repurposed, with the last disposed of in 1912.

== Development ==
Of the original six frigates of the United States Navy, the three designed to carry 44 guns achieved early success during the War of 1812. In response, Congress authorized the construction of six additional 44-gun heavy frigates, which became known as the Java class in 1813. However, their wartime construction proved detrimental; in the rush to complete the ships quickly, the quality of materials and craftsmanship suffered. Only two vessels of the class entered service, both of which had short operational careers due to issues regarding their hurried development.

Four years later, Congress authorized the construction of nine additional frigates as part of a peacetime "gradual increase" of the Navy. In an effort to avoid a repeat of the Java class, the Navy emphasized a deliberate construction process, which allowed time to source high-quality materials and ensure quality craftsmanship. Congress did not allocate sufficient funding to complete all of the newly authorized frigates. Instead, the Navy adopted a strategy of constructing the ships nearly to completion, after which they were laid up in shipyards under protective structures. This approach was intended to preserve the hulls, as launching the ships prematurely would have led to rapid deterioration and would have been costly. The plan was to launch and complete each vessel in the event of war, thus retaining the quality vessels without the high cost associated with maintaining them during peacetime.

== Design ==
The new batch of frigates, beginning with Potomac, were based on the older Java design. The new ships had a length between perpendiculars of 175 ft (53 m), a beam of 45 ft (14 m), and a depth of 14.3 ft (4.4 m). They were rated to carry 44 guns, although the exact number and shot of each gun varied between each ship and over time. They displaced 1,726 short tons (1,541 long tons) and had a complement of 480 sailors and officers. The ships are also referred to as the Raritan-class frigate.

The ships of the class entered service over a span of 40 years, with the first laid down in 1820 and the last commissioned in 1861. The long delay between their initial design and commissioning meant that the later ships were outdated by the time they were finished. The last two ships, Sabine and Santee, launched in 1855, were considered obsolete upon entering service. The entire class constituted some of the last sail-only warships in the Navy's inventory as the technology had been eclipsed by the steam engine. The Navy considered converting the duo into steamships, but instead chose to lengthen each ship by 15 ft (4.6 m). The longer duo is sometimes referred to as the Sabine-class frigate.

== Service history ==
As each ship was slowly brought into service, they were assigned to various American squadrons around the world to show the flag and respond to global crises. In 1831, Potomac was sent across the world during the First Sumatran expedition in response to the murder of American sailors; she was followed up by Columbia seven years later during the Second Sumatran expedition. A decade later, most of the class participated in the Mexican-American war and the capture of California and Monterrey.

In 1858, St. Lawrence took part in the Paraguay expedition. By the outbreak of the American Civil War, Savannah and Cumberland had been converted into sloops. When the port of Norfolk was seized by the confederates early in the war, Columbia and Raritan were burned to prevent their capture. In 1862, Cumberland was sunk by CSS Virginia–herself built on the hull of USS Merrimack captured at Norfolk–during the Battle of Hampton Roads. During the war, several of the ships served in the Union Blockade of the Confederate coast before being gradually withdrawn from frontline service. Santee was assigned to the US Naval Academy, Sabine was used as a training ship, and Potomac, Brandywine, and St Lawrence were used as storeships before the war ended. Brandywine was wrecked in an unrelated fire at Norfolk in 1864. The remaining ships were slowly retired, with Santee being the last in service until her disposal in 1912.

== Ships in class ==
Data
| Name | Builder | Laid down | Launched | Commissioned | Fate |
|---|---|---|---|---|---|
| Brandywine | Washington Navy Yard | September 1821 | 16 June 1825 | 25 August 1825 | Caught fire 3 September 1864, wreck sold 26 March 1867 |
| Columbia | Washington Navy Yard | November 1825 | 9 March 1836 | May 1838 | Burned to prevent capture, 20 April 1861. |
| Cumberland | Boston Navy Yard | 1825 | 24 May 1842 | November 1843 | Sunk by CSS Virginia at the Battle of Hampton Roads, 8 March 1862. |
| Potomac | Washington Navy Yard | 9 August 1819 | 22 March 1822 | 15 June 1831 | Sold 24 May 1877. |
| Raritan | Philadelphia Navy Yard | September 1820 | 13 June 1843 | 1 December 1843 | Burned to prevent capture, 20 April 1861 |
| Sabine | New York Navy Yard | February 1823 | 3 February 1855 | 23 August 1858 | Sold 23 September 1883 |
| Santee | Portsmouth Navy Yard | 12 February 1823 | 16 February 1855 | 9 June 1861 | Sold 2 August 1912 |
| Savannah | New York Navy Yard | July 1820 | 5 May 1842 | 15 October 1843 | Sold 27 September 1883 |
| St. Lawrence | Norfolk Navy Yard | 1826 | 25 March 1847 | 17 August 1848 | Sold 31 December 1875 |
