= Hugh George Campbell =

American naval officer (1760–1820)

- Born: 1760; South Carolina
- Died: November 11, 1820 (aged 59–60); Washington, D.C.
- Burial place: Congressional Cemetery
- Military career
- Service years: 1775–1820
- Rank: Captain
- Unit: USS Defense
- Commands: USS Eagle (1798); USS Adams (1799); USS Constellation (1797); USS Essex (1799); USS Constitution
- Conflicts: American Revolutionary War; First Barbary War; War of 1812

Hugh George Campbell (1760 – November 11, 1820) was an American naval captain, veteran of the American Revolution and the War of 1812, and commander of the USS Constitution from 1806 to 1807.

== Biography ==
Little is known about Campbell's life before the American Revolution, however, Campbell was born in 1760 in South Carolina and enlisted in the South Carolina Navy in 1775 when he was 15-years-old. He saw stationed aboard the Defence and saw combat against British vessels off the coast of Charleston while attempting to block a channel with scuttled hulks. After the war, he became a first mate of the cutter South Carolina with the United States Revenue Cutter Service in 1798. By 1798, he had risen to command of the cutter Eagle in Philadelphia. When the ships of the Revenue Marine were taken under the United States Navy's control during the Quasi-War with France, Campbell was commissioned a master commandant. He was promoted to captain in October 1800.

During the First Barbary War, Campbell subsequently commanded the frigate USS Adams in Commodore Richard V. Morris’ Mediterranean Squadron in 1802, and then USS Constellation and USS Essex in Commodore Barron’s squadron in the summer of 1804. Campbell was the last commander of the Constitution to fight in the First Barbary War.

On May 30, 1806, Captain Campbell became commander of the Constitution, succeeding John Rodgers. He led the ship from May 30, 1806 to December 8, 1807, being succeeded by his predecessor, John Rodgers.

Following his time aboard the Constitution, he took charge of gunboat construction in North Carolina in May of 1808, and in the following year assumed command of the “southern station” from Wilmington, North Carolina to the St. Mary's River, the boundary with Spanish Florida. In February 1812, Campbell, with the tacit approval of the Madison Administration, provided support to American residents on Amelia Island, Florida, who were rebelling against Spanish rule. The uprising had considerable success, and the rebels sought acquisition by the United States.

During the War of 1812, Campbell captured seven British merchant vessels in Spanish-controlled waters. Campbell died while on a to Washington, D.C. on November 11, 1820. He was interred in the Congressional Cemetery.
