= Sailing frigate classification =

United States Navy classification system

The Sailing frigate classification system used during the 19th century was a classification scheme used in several western countries. It was officially adopted by the United States Navy. The system classified sailing frigates according to their gun rating.

== Ratings ==
Type	Maximum Gun Rating	Minimum Gun Rating	Gun Decks (Including main deck)
First Class	50	42	2
Second Class	36	28	1 or 2
Third Class	24	20	1

== Use ==
The United States Navy used this classification system officially, beginning at least by 1825. The Royal Institution of Naval Architects, an international organization of naval architects, also adopted the system, beginning in 1860.

The United States adopted a new rating system during the American Civil War, based on the thrown weight of broadsides. By 1875, this system was replaced by a system of steam warship classification based on tonnage.
