= Java-class frigate (1813) =

War of 1812-era warships

Class overview
- Name: Java class
- Operators: United States Navy
- Preceded by: Original six frigates of the United States Navy
- Succeeded by: Potomac-class frigate
- Built: 1813-1815
- Planned: 6
- Completed: 2
- Canceled: 3
- Lost: 1
- Retired: 2

General characteristics
- Class & type: Sailing frigate
- Displacement: 1,508 short tons (1,368 metric tons)
- Length: 175 feet (53 m) long between perpendiculars; 145 feet (44 m) long at the waterline
- Beam: 44.5 feet (13.6 m)
- Draft: 13.5 feet (4.1 m)
- Propulsion: Sails
- Complement: 400
- Armament: 45 guns of various shot

The Java or Guerriere-class frigate was a series of heavy sailing frigates built for the United States Navy during the War of 1812. Designed to shore up the fledgling Navy, the ships had a miserable service life. Of the six initially planned, only three were laid down, and only two entered service. The two ships of the class had a limited role within the Navy, stemming from poor craftsmenship and wood quality due to their war-time construction.

== Design and development ==
Under the Jefferson Administration in the early 1800s, the US Navy was invisoned as a militia-based force that operated small, ad-hoc gunboats. Congress opposed expanding the Navy, which left the nation unable to defend itself at sea. It reversed course following the outbreak of the War of 1812, and ordered 6 frigates in 1813, which made them the first purpose-built vessels for the Navy since 1800. The new frigates were greatly modeled after the earlier original six frigates, with characteristics similar to those of the 44-gun variant. The ships were armed with a total of 45 guns, displaced 1,508 short tons (1,368 metric tons), were 175 feet (53 m) long between perpendiculars, 145 feet (44 m) long at the waterline, had a beam of 44.5 feet (13.6 m), a depth of 13.5 feet (4.1 m), and were manned by a crew of 400.

== History ==
Although six ships were ordered, only three were laid down, all in 1813. Of the three, Columbia and Continental were renamed after prizes captured from the Royal Navy while they were still in the shipyard. After the American defeat at Battle of Bladensburg, the newly renamed and nearly completed Essex was burned to prevent her from falling into British hands.

Due to their war time construction, the two remaining ships were poorly made and quickly deteriorated due to the use of green wood. After she was launched, Java was described by Oliver Hazard Perry as, "not appear[ing] to have been faithfully built, [and] the work in many respects bad..." Post-war, the two ships were sent to the Mediterranean, where Guerriere engaged the Barbary Pirates. Java was of little use to the Navy due to her poor craftsmanship, and she was laid up for years as attempts to rebuild her failed to materialize. After her service, Guerriere became a school ship and Java was reduced to a receiving ship before both were found to be too costly to maintain and were broken up in the early 1840s.

In 1820, the class's design was revisited, which produced the seven frigates of the Potomac-class, which served as the backbone for the Navy for several decades.

== Ships in class ==
Below are characteristics of every named ship of the class, which is also referred to as the Guerriere-class.

Name	Initial name	Builder	Laid down	Launched	Commissioned	Fate
Essex	Columbia	Washington Navy Yard	1813	–	–	Burned to prevent capture
Guerriere	Continental	Philadelphia Navy Yard	1813	20 Jun 1814	1814	Decommissioned 19 Dec 1831
Java	–	Flannigan & Parsons, Baltimore	1813	1 Aug 1814	Aug 1815	Broken up in 1842
Three more ships ordered, never laid down
