= Liverpool Hero (ship) =

Several vessels have been named Liverpool Hero for the port of Liverpool.

== Liverpool Hero (1781 ship) ==
- Liverpool Hero (1781 ship) was built in France in 1777, probably as Jeune Emilia. She was taken in prize in 1780. In 1781 she entered into the triangular trade in enslaved people. From 1781 she made six complete voyages from Liverpool as a slave ship. On her fourth enslaving voyage she suffered an exceptionally high mortality rate among the captives she had embarked. Her third voyage had been marred by high mortality, but on the fourth 330 captives, 59% of the number she had embarked, died. She was lost in 1794 off the coast of Africa on her seventh voyage, probably with her crew and captives.

== Liverpool Hero (1798 ship) ==
History

Great Britain
- Name: Liverpool Hero
- Launched: 1791, Spain
- Acquired: circa 1798
- Fate: Lost 1801

General characteristics
- Tons burthen: 219, or 234 (bm)
- Complement: 1798:20; 1798:25; 1799:25
- Armament: 1798: 6 × 3-pounder guns; 1798: 10 × 6&9-pounder guns; 1798: 18 × 9&12-pounder guns; 1799: 18 × 6&9-pounder guns
- Notes: Two decks; mahogany-built

Liverpool Hero was built in Spain, or its colonies, in 1791, almost certainly under another name. She was taken in prize and entered British records in 1798 as a West Indiaman. She then entered into the triangular trade in enslaved people. She made one complete voyage as a slave ship and was lost in 1801 near Suriname on her second voyage. All the slaves aboard her reportedly drowned.

=== Career ===
Liverpool Hero first appeared in Lloyd's Register (LR) in 1798. Captain James Fitzpatrick acquired a letter-of-marque on 12 March 1798.

Year	Master	Owner	Trade	Source
1798	Fitzpatrick	Brettarghe	Liverpool–Barbados	LR

Lloyd's List's ship arrival and departure data show that Liverpool Hero, Fitzpatrick, master, made one voyage to Martinique.

Although the entry in LR for Liverpool Hero remained unchanged until after her loss in 1801, new owners in late 1798 entered her into the slave trade.

1st slave voyage (1799–1800): Captain Alexander Hackney acquired a letter-of-marque on 9 November 1798. Hackney (or Hackery), sailed from Liverpool on 4 January 1799. In early 1800 she was at Lisbon. Liverpool Hero acquired her slaves on the Gold Coast and arrived at Suriname on 28 September. She sailed from Suriname on 17 December and arrived back at Liverpool on 30 January 1800, having sailed via Barbados. She had sailed from Liverpool with 51 crew members and she had suffered 11 crew deaths on her voyage.

2nd slave voyage (1800–Loss): Captain Alexander Laing acquired a letter-of-marque on 16 July 1800. He sailed from Liverpool on 1 September 1800 with 39 crew members.

=== Loss ===
In June 1801, Lloyd's List reported that Liverpool Hero, from Africa, had been lost near Suriname.

A secondary source reported that Liverpool Hero, Captain Alexander Laing, had sailed from Liverpool to Porto-Novo. She then had wrecked on her voyage from Africa to the West Indies. The source reports that all hands and the slaves trapped in the hold were drowned. However, the same source states that Dick, Alexander Laing, master, had delivered slaves to Demerara in 1804. Another secondary source reports that Captain Alexander Laing died on Dick on 3 July 1804, during another slave voyage.

The Star reported that the ship's first and third mate, along with seven of the crew, made it to shore in Cayenne with the ship's boat and a canoe.

In 1801, 23 British slave ships were lost. Of these, ten were lost in the Middle Passage, between the coast of Africa and the West Indies. In 1802, a year mostly of peace because of the Peace of Amiens, the numbers were 12 and five. Between 1798 and 1802, about 160 vessels per year sailed from British ports on enslaving voyages.

== Liverpool Hero (1809 ship) ==
- Liverpool Hero (1809 ship) was a Danish vessel taken in prize almost surely in 1809. She first appeared in Lloyd's Register (LR) in 1811 but was already reported to be trading between England and Spain in late 1809 and 1810. The USS Chesapeake captured and burnt her in 1813. The capture gave rise to two court cases in US courts.

== Sources ==
- Behrendt, Stephen D. (1990). The Captains in the British Slave Trade from 1785 to 1807. Vol. 140. Transactions of the Historic Society of Lancashire and Cheshire. pp. 79–140.
- Behrendt, Stephen D. (2001). "Markets, Transaction Cycles, and Profits: Merchant Decision Making in the British Slave Trade". William and Mary Quarterly. 58 (1, New Perspectives on the Transatlantic Slave Trade). Omohundro Institute of Early American History and Culture: 171–204. doi:10.2307/2674423. JSTOR 2674423.
- Dawson, Paul L. (2022). The Battle Against Slavery: The Untold Story of How a Group of Yorkshire Radicals Began the War to End the Slave Trade. Frontline books. ISBN 9781399018487.
- Inikori, Joseph (1996). "Measuring the unmeasured hazards of the Atlantic slave trade: Documents relating to the British trade". Revue française d'histoire d'outre-mer. 83 (312): 53–92. doi:10.3406/outre.1996.3457.
