= Naval Act of 1794 =

1794 legislation by the US Congress

- Other short titles: Naval Armament Act of 1794
- Long title: An Act to provide a Naval Armament
- Enacted by: the 3rd United States Congress
- Effective: March 27, 1794

Citations
- Statutes at Large: 1 Stat. 350

Legislative history
- Introduced in the House; Passed the House of Representatives on March 10, 1794 (50–39); Passed the Senate on March 19, 1794; Signed into law by President George Washington on March 27, 1794

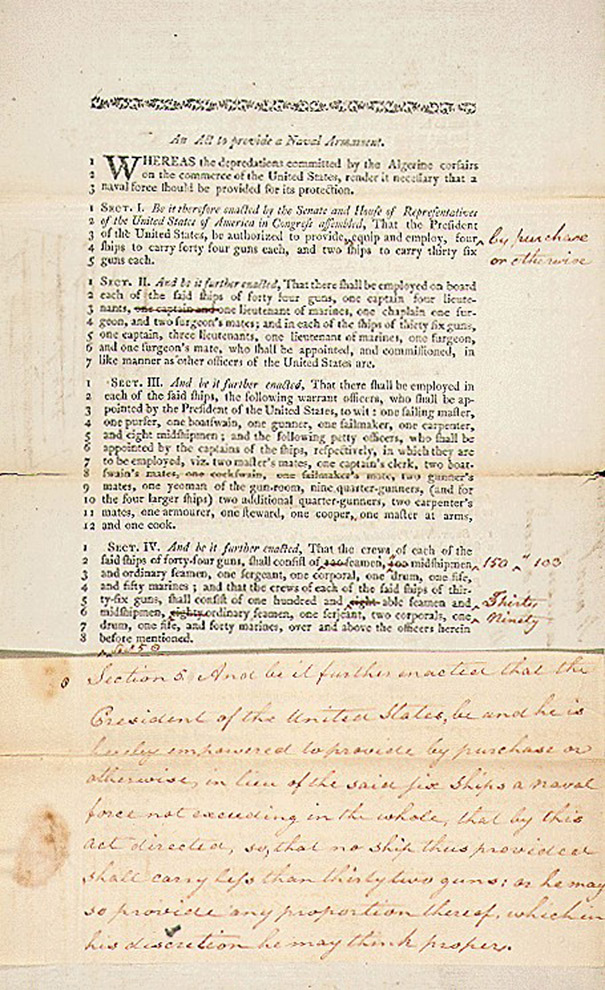
The Act to Provide a Naval Armament

Page two of the Act to Provide a Naval Armament

The Act to Provide a Naval Armament (Sess. 1, ch. 12, 1 Stat. 350), also known as the Naval Act of 1794, or simply, the Naval Act, was passed by the 3rd United States Congress on March 27, 1794, and signed into law by President George Washington. The act authorized the construction of six frigates at a total cost of $688,888.82. These ships were the first ships of what became the United States Navy.

== Purpose ==
In August 1785, after the Revolutionary War drew to a close, Congress had sold Alliance, the last ship remaining in the Continental Navy, due to a lack of funds to maintain the ship. From 1785 until 1797, the United States' only armed maritime service was the Revenue Marine, founded in 1790 at the prompting of Secretary of the Treasury Alexander Hamilton to enforce the nation's new export duties.

In 1785, two American merchant ships had been captured by the Muslim state of Algiers, and Minister to France Thomas Jefferson decided that an American naval force was needed to protect the passage of American vessels through the Mediterranean. Jefferson's recommendations were initially met with indifference and even hostility from a Congress that feared both the expense and the political dominance of a powerful naval establishment. The House of Representatives in 1786, and the Senate in 1791, discussed various proposals for a naval force, including estimates of costs for building frigates, but none were acted upon. Only in 1793, when Muslim pirates from Algiers had captured eleven additional merchant ships, was a proposal finally taken seriously.

A bill was presented to the House of Representatives on January 20, 1794, providing for the construction of four ships to carry 44 guns each, and two ships to carry 36 guns each – by purchase or otherwise. The bill also provided pay and sustenance for naval officers, Marine officers, petty officers, sailors, and marines, and outlined how each ship should be crewed in order to operate them. Opposition to the bill was strong and a clause was added that should peace be established with Algiers the construction of the ships was to cease.

Piracy had not been a problem when the American colonies were a part of the British Empire; the Royal Navy protected American vessels, since they belonged to subjects of the British Crown. After the American Revolutionary War, however, that protection was lost, and many foreign powers found that they could harass American merchant ships with impunity. Indeed, once the French Revolution started, Great Britain also started interdicting American merchant ships and there was little the fledgling American government could do about it. This was a major philosophical shift for the young Republic, many of whose leaders felt that a Navy would be too expensive to raise and maintain, and would unnecessarily provoke the European powers, in particular Great Britain. In the end, however, it was felt necessary to protect American interests at sea.

In March 1796, as construction of the frigates slowly progressed, a peace accord was announced between the United States and Algiers. In accordance with clause nine of the Naval Act of 1794, a clause that specifically directed that construction of the frigates be discontinued if peace was established, construction on all six ships was halted. After some debate and prompting by President Washington, Congress passed an act on 20 April 1796, allowing the construction and funding to continue only on the three ships nearest to completion: United States, Constellation and Constitution.

By late 1798 however, France began to seize American merchant vessels and the attempt at a diplomatic resolution had resulted in the XYZ Affair, prompting Congress to approve funds for completion of the remaining three frigates: President, Congress and Chesapeake.

== Transcript ==
THIRD CONGRESS OF THE UNITED STATES

AT THE FIRST SESSION

Begun and held at the City of Philadelphia, in the State of Pennsylvania, on Monday, the second of December, one thousand seven hundred and ninety-three.

An ACT to provide a Naval Armament.

WHEREAS the depredations committed by the Algerine corsairs on the commerce of the United States render it necessary that a naval force should be provided for its protection:

Sec. 1. BE it therefore enacted by the Senate and House of Representatives of the United States of America, in Congress assembled, That the President of the United States be authorized to provide, by purchase or otherwise, equip and employ four ships to carry forty four guns each, and two ships to carry thirty six guns each.

Sec. 2. And be it further enacted, That there shall be employed on board each of the said ships of forty-four guns, one captain, four lieutenants, one lieutenant of marines, one chaplain, one surgeon and two surgeon's mates; and in each of the ships of thirty six guns, one captain, three lieutenants, one lieutenant of marines, one surgeon, and one surgeon's mate, who shall be appointed and commissioned in like manner as other officers of the United States are.

Sec. 3. And be it further enacted, That there shall be employed, in each of the said ships, the following warrant-officers, who shall be appointed by the President of the United States, to wit; one sailing-master, one purser, one boatswain, one gunner, one sail-maker, one carpenter, and eight midshipmen; and the following petty officers, who shall be appointed by the captains of the ships, respectively, in which they are to be employed, viz: two master's mates, one captain's clerk, two boatswain's mates, one cockswain, one sail-maker's mate, two gunner's mates, one yeoman of the gun room, nine quarter-gunners (and for the four larger ships) two additional quarter-gunners, two carpenter's mates, one armourer, one steward, one cooper, one master-at-arms, and one cook.

Sec. 4. And be it further enacted, That the crews of each of the said ships of forty four guns, shall consist of one hundred and fifty seamen, one hundred and three midshipmen and ordinary seamen, one serjeant, one corporal, one drum, one fife, and fifty marines: And that the crews of each of the said ships of thirty six guns shall consist of one hundred and thirty able seamen and midshipmen, ninety ordinary seamen, one serjeant, two corporals, one drum, one fife, and forty marines, over and above the officers herein before mentioned.

Sec. 5. And be it further enacted, That the President of the United States be, and he is hereby empowered, to provide, by purchase or otherwise, in lieu of the said six ships, a naval force not exceeding, in the whole, that by this act directed, so that no ship thus provided, shall carry less than thirty two guns; or he may so provide any proportion thereof, which, in his discretion, he may think proper.

Sec. 6. And be it further enacted, That the pay and subsistence of the respective commissioned and warrant officers, be, as follows:—A captain, seventy five dollars per month, and six rations per day: —A lieutenant, forty dollars per month, and three rations per day;—a lieutenant of marines, twenty six dollars per month, and two rations per day;—a chaplain, forty dollars per month, and two rations per day;—a sailing master, forty dollars per month, and two rations per day;—a surgeon, fifty dollars per month, and two rations per day;—a surgeon's-mate, thirty dollars per month, and two rations per day;—a purser, forty dollars per month, and two rations per day;—a boatswain, fourteen dollars per month, and two rations per day;—a gunner, fourteen dollars per month, and two rations per day;—a sailmaker, fourteen dollars per month, and two rations per day;—a carpenter, fourteen dollars per month, and two rations per day.

Sec. 7. And be it further enacted, That the pay to be allowed to the petty officers, midshipmen, seamen, ordinary seamen and marines, shall be fixed by the President of the United States: Provided, That the whole sum to be given for the whole pay aforesaid, shall not exceed twenty seven thousand dollars per month, and that each of the said persons shall be entitled to one ration per day.

Sec. 8. And be it further enacted, That the ration shall consist of, as follows: Sunday, one pound of bread, one pound and a half of beef, and half a pint of rice:—Monday, one pound of bread, one pound of pork, half a pint of peas or beans, and four ounces of cheese:—Tuesday, one pound of bread, one pound and a half of beef, and one pound of potatoes or turnips, and pudding:— Wednesday, one pound of bread, two ounces of butter, or, in lieu thereof, six ounces of molasses, four ounces of cheese, and half a pint of rice:—Thursday, one pound of bread, one pound of pork, and half a pint of peas or beans:—Friday, one pound of bread, one pound of salt fish, two ounces of butter or one gill of oil, and one pound of potatoes:—Saturday, one pound of bread, one pound of pork, half a pint of peas or beans, and four ounces of cheese.—And there shall also be allowed one half pint of distilled spirits per day, or, in lieu thereof, one quart of beer per day, to each ration.

Sec. 9. Provided always, and be it further enacted, That if a peace shall take place between the United States and the Regency of Algiers, that no farther proceeding be had under this act.

FREDERICK AUGUSTUS MUHLENBERG, Speaker of the House of Representatives.

JOHN ADAMS, vice-president of the United States, and President of the Senate.

Approved —March the twenty seventh 1794.

G º : WASHINGTON, President of the United States.

Deposited among the Rolls in the Office of the Secretary of State.

Edm: Randolph

Secretary of State.

== See also ==
- History of the United States Navy

== Bibliography ==
- Abbot, Willis J. (1898). The Naval History of the United States. Volume One. New York, N.Y.: P.F. Collier.
- Allen, Gardner W. (1909). Our Naval War With France. Boston and New York: Houghton Mifflin Company. OCLC 1202325. "naval war with france."
- This article incorporates public domain material from websites or documents of the United States Government.
