= Josiah Fox =

British naval architect (1763–1847)

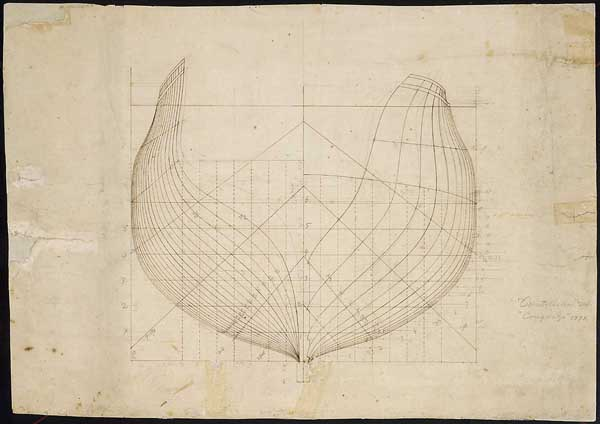
Hull drawing of the U.S.S. Constellation and U.S.S. Congress, 1795. Josiah Fox was responsible for putting Humphreys' designs onto paper.

Josiah Fox (1763–1847) was an English-born American naval architect noted for his involvement in the design and construction of the first significant warships of the United States Navy.

== Early years ==
Fox was born in Falmouth, Cornwall, Kingdom of Great Britain on October 9, 1763. He completed an apprenticeship at the Royal Dockyard, Plymouth, where he later served as a shipwright. In 1793 he traveled to the United States to survey timber resources and was there engaged to teach drafting to the sons of Jonathan Penrose, an American shipwright.

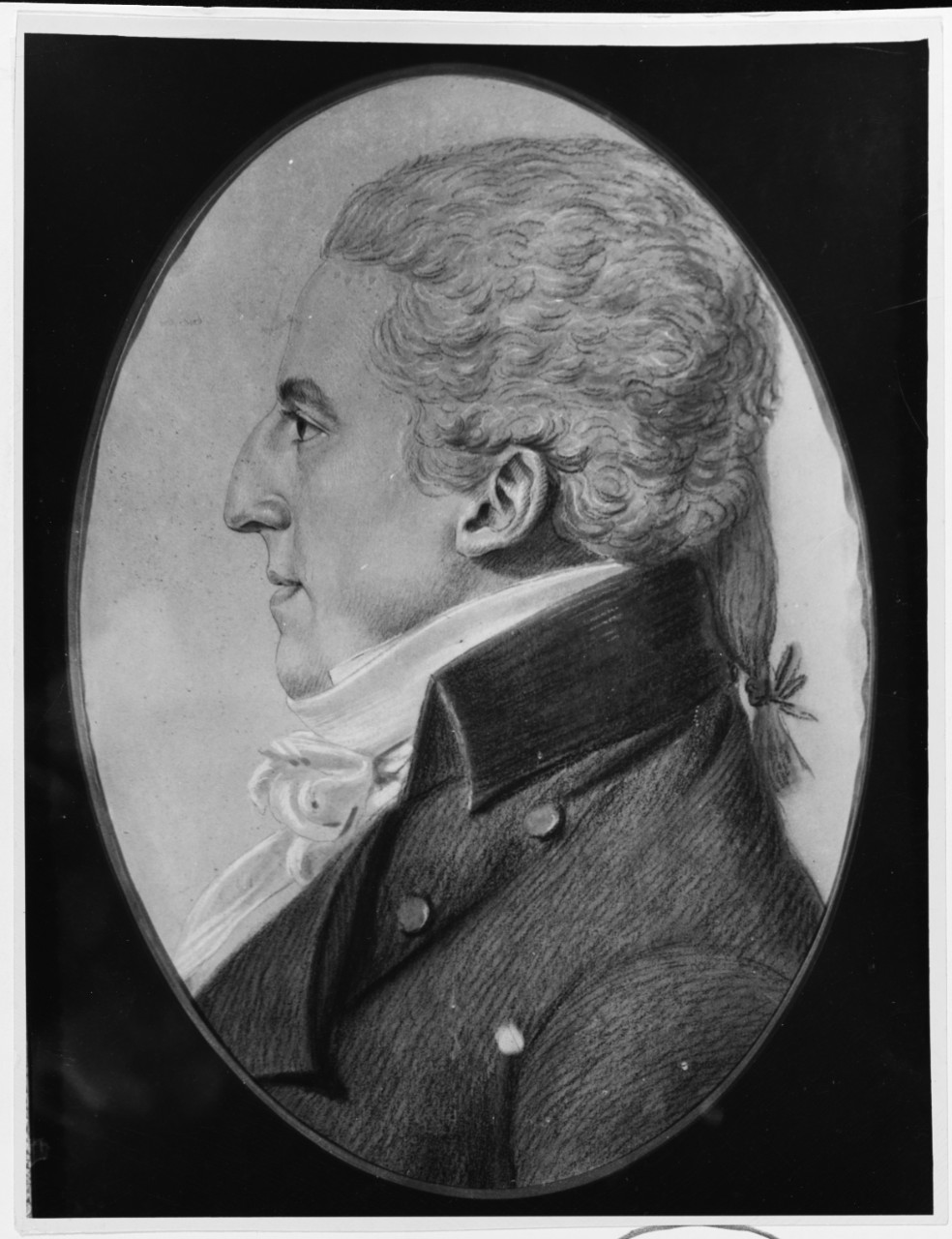
Josiah Fox (1763–1847) Naval Architect, image circa 1800

=== Philadelphia Naval Shipyard ===
On July 17, 1794, Fox signed and as a Quaker "affirmed" his support of the Constitution of the United States. Fox was initially employed at $500.00 per year by the US Navy as a clerk draftsman working under Naval Constructor Joshua Humphreys at Philadelphia Naval Shipyard. Humphreys was the designer of the first Navy frigates. Fox and Humphreys disagreed over design issues, the former believing that the designs were too long and had too sharp a bow, among other problems. This disagreement caused significant animosity between the two, with arguments over credit for the design continuing in the press as late as 1827.

== Gosport Navy Yard ==
Upon arrival at Gosport Navy Yard, Fox wrote to the Secretary of War Timothy Pickering, on 24 September 1795 and stated: "The public Service Requiring the utmost Harmony should take place in the Naval Yard at Gosport (Virginia)" and went on to propose the first regulations for the governance of the Navy Yard. Fox's regulations were written to correct what he perceived to be serious deficiencies. In his letter, Fox proposed immediate changes to the shipyard and a new emphasis on "public service and economy"(see thumbnail). On 1 August 1798, Fox was appointed Navy Constructor to superintend the building of the frigate Chesapeake, 38, which was to be built in Norfolk, Virginia. In this role, Fox's salary was set at $2 000 per annum. Fox apparently altered Humphreys’ design to his own liking, though this may have been partially the result of a timber shortage. The Chesapeake turned out to be less impressive ship than the other early frigates, had a reputation as an unlucky ship, and was captured during the War of 1812 by the Royal Navy frigate HMS Shannon in 1813.

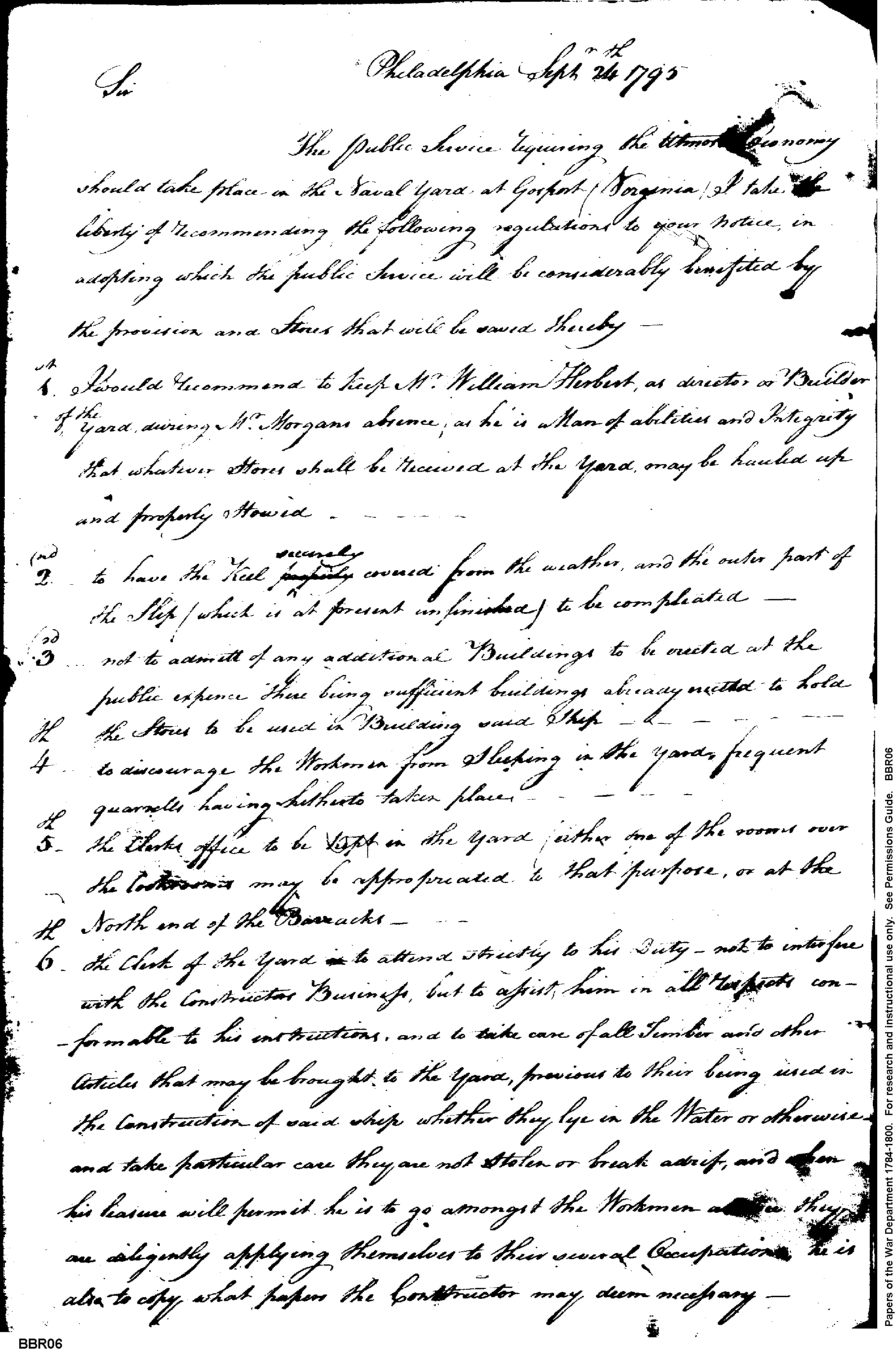
Josiah Fox to the Secretary of War, proposed regulations for Gosport Navy Yard 24 September 1795, p. 1

== Washington Navy Yard ==
In the first years of the 19th century, Fox was responsible for fitting out some of the gunboats that were the Republican Jefferson Administration's unsuccessful attempt at creating a "Naval Militia." On May 4, 1804, Secretary of the Navy, Robert Smith appointed as Naval Constructor for the Washington Navy Yard. Smith endorsed Fox as " a scientific as well as a practical man, [who] stands high among the first in his profession." At that navy yard Fox was to superintend the construction and repair of naval vessels. Thomas Tingey had overall charge of the yard and its employees, however, as naval constructor, Fox reported to the secretary of the Navy and directed the largest and most skilled group of mechanics and laborers. Fox's salary as constructor for the WNY was increased to a generous $2000.00 per annum with $500.00 additional allowance for housing, and the liberty of taking as many apprentices as he chose. During these years, Fox designed the sloop of war USS Wasp and oversaw major repairs to the frigates USS United States, President, and Essex. Despite the navy yard's progress in building and repairing vessels, Fox's relationship with Commodore Tingey deteriorated over time. Tingey believed in discipline, deference to authority, and was a firm believer in the chain of command. Fox on the other hand considered his appointment by the secretary of the Navy sufficient to ignore yard policy when it suited. By 1806 each man was complaining to the Secretary about the other. While the two had differing personalities, a substantial part of their dilemma was the confusing reporting relationships. Tingey had overall charge of the shipyard but Fox was hired by and reported directly to the Secretary of the Navy. One proof of the structural nature of this problem is that William Doughty, Fox's successor, experienced similar difficulties in his dealing with both Tingey and the subsequent Commandant Isaac Hull.

Another source of disagreement was Fox's attempt to better organize his workforce of mechanics and laborers along more rational lines. As part of this effort, Fox wrote some of the first standardized job descriptions and expanded the apprenticeship program. Fox, although a member of the Society of Friends or "Quakers," not only worked for the military but was a slaveholder. In 1803/1804 probably while working in the Gosport Navy Yard, Fox purchased three enslaved individuals: Edwin Jones, William Oakley and Betsey Doynes. While in Washington DC, the Fox family utilized Betsey Doynes as a servant and cook. Fox, to the alarm of his white workforce, broke with custom and entered Jones and Oakley as apprentice carpenters. In 1808 slaves made up about one third of the WNY workforce Most of the enslaved worked as laborers or blacksmith strikers, so Fox's decision to apprentice both Jones and Oakley in the elite ship-carpenter trade outraged the already anxious white mechanics. Their resentment of Josiah Fox's employment of Blacks in skilled trades led Commodore Thomas Tingey to request on March 19, 1811, "the dismissal of all slaves, apprentices, or others, now employed as mechanics or tradesmen in this years – except those attached to the Smiths shop, and the Caulker business – two branches that we should occasionally find difficulty in filling without them."

Among other changes Fox endorsed were controls on waste and pilferage and he urged his master mechanics to be "careful to prevent the Timber Materials and other of the Public property in the Timber Materials and other of the Public property in the Carpenters Department from being improperly expended, Wantonly destroyed, Wasted, Injured or pillaged – He will not permit any alteration whatever to be made in any part of the Ships whilst under repair without express orders being given for that purpose." In addition to his concerned about the dangers of fire, Fox cautioned his workers, "take care that no Fires be made by the Carpenters and others attached to them to Bend their planks but at such places as may be deemed to be most proper for that careful purpose, and he is charged to see them all extinguished by Sunset." Fox even went as far as to urge his employees to remember and care for their environment and to avoid throwing debris in the Potomac and Anacostia Rivers. He urged his carpenters: "When working afloat he is not on any authority whatever to throw over board into the River any Stage Plank & Spalls, or other useful materials; neither is he to throw any rotten stuff that will sink to the injury of the river."

== Dismissal ==
Throughout 1808 and into 1809, Fox's rocky relationship with Commodore Tingey (especially his lack of deference to the chain of command) continued to deteriorate. His changes and proposals were met with wide skepticism; many shipyard laborers and mechanics thought his Quaker notions of economy and simplicity would only reduce their hours of work and thus their wages. Yet another cause of friction centered on his move to stop or reduce the popular practice of work-breaks for whiskey and grog, which many naval shipyards tolerated. Perhaps though in the end, it was Fox's ardent Federalism which gradually lost him the support of Thomas Jefferson and James Madison. On November 10, 1808, a petition sent to the Secretary of the Navy, Robert Smith, and signed by 72 Washington Navy Yard workers even questioned Fox's loyalty.

We are led to believe of Mr Josiah Fox Naval Constructor who is well known as being the enemy of the whole establishment at this place and is believe on good grounds eagerly on it as an additional reason for vilifying the Navy Yard from hence and whose unfounded assertions to the disadvantage of the place.

Madison's new secretary of Navy, Paul Hamilton, probably on Tingey's recommendation, "unceremoniously and perhaps unjustly" dismissed Fox. The official notification came on August 2, 1809 when Hamilton directed Thomas Tingey, that Josiah Fox's employment as "Naval Constructor, Salary $2000 rent,... $200, appointments and allowances for Salary & Rent are to cease." In his letter to Fox, Hamilton stated "It has been represented to me that there is no longer any occasion for your Services as Navy constructor at this Yard. This being the case it becomes my duty to apprize you that your appointment must cease." On August 11, 1809, Hamilton, probably at Tingey's bidding, directed that all of Fox's white apprentices be kept on the yard rolls if possible and the blacks dismissed [Sharp]. In December 1809 prior to leaving the District of Columbia for Ohio, Fox manumitted Edwin Jones, William Oakley and prospectively manumitted Betsey Doynes. Fox died on 17 November 1847 at the age of 85 and was buried in the cemetery near the Concord Friends Meeting House, near Colerain, Ohio.

== Quaker family links ==
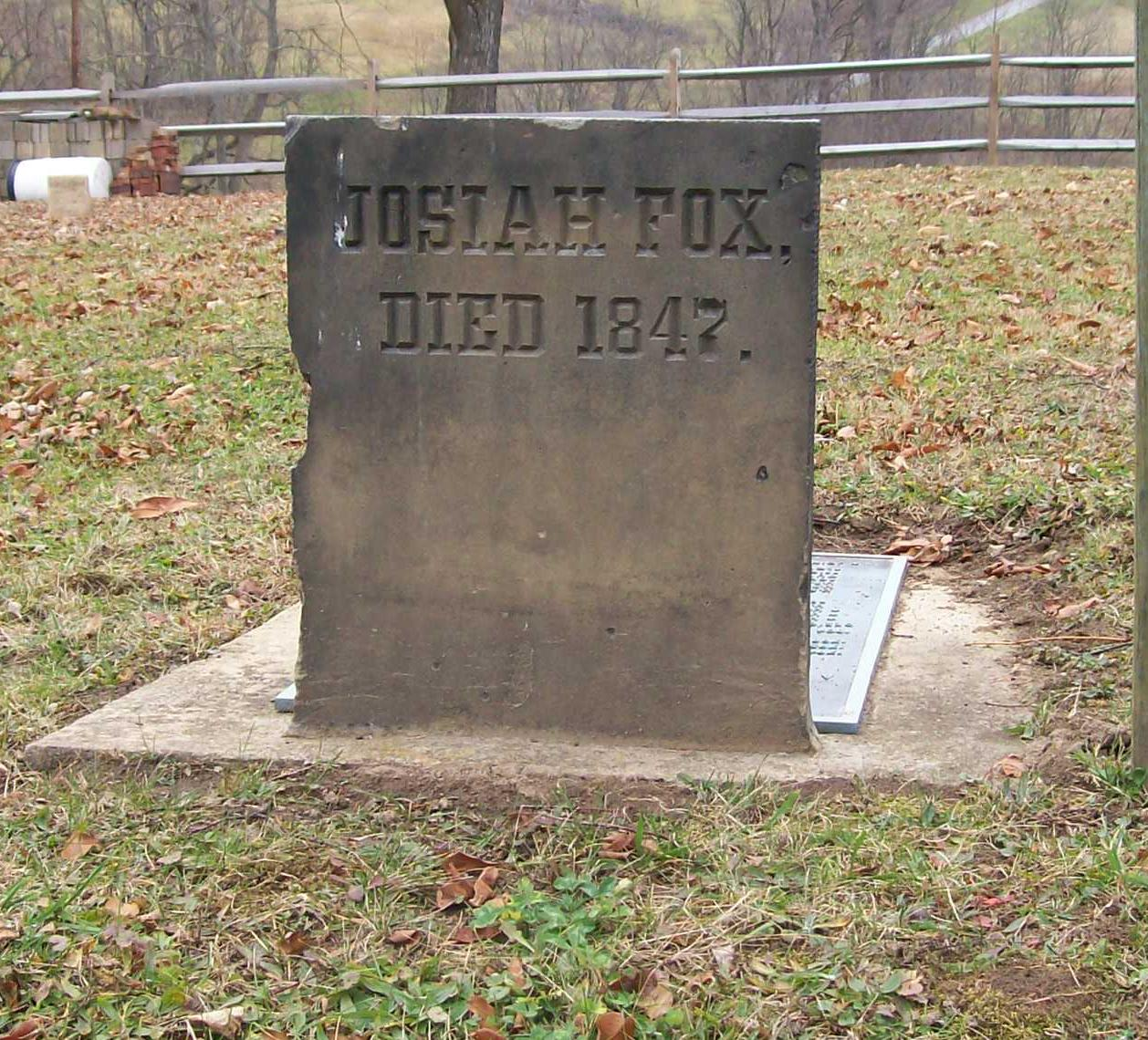
Fox's stone in Concord Hicksite Cemetery.

Fox, a Quaker, married Anne Miller of Philadelphia and had 10 children. He had been disowned from his Quaker Meeting for his involvement in the construction of warships, but was reinstated after the War of 1812. In 1814, Fox and his family settled in Colerain, Belmont County, Ohio, located in south-eastern Ohio.

Josiah Fox and two of his sons visited Cornwall in September 1833, to take possession of the property of his deceased brother, John. On Sunday, September 8, he met one of his relations, Barclay Fox, who recorded the meeting enthusiastically in his journal. On the next day, they met by chance at Falmouth Docks, which Josiah and his sons were inspecting.

== Bibliography ==
- Toll, Ian (2006). Six Frigates: the Epic History of the Founding of the U.S. Navy. New York: W. W. Norton. ISBN 0-393-05847-6.
- Westlake Merle Josiah Fox 1763-1847 Xlibris Books 2003, p. 49
- "Ferry Landing, Fall 2003". Martin Ferry Area Historical Society.
