= Liverpool Hero (1809 ship) =

History

United Kingdom
- Name: Liverpool Hero
- Launched: Denmark
- Acquired: 1809
- Captured: 13 January 1813
- Fate: Burnt January 1813

General characteristics
- Tons burthen: 186 (bm)
- Sail plan: Brig
- Complement: 15
- Armament: 10 guns

Liverpool Hero was a Danish vessel taken in prize, almost surely in 1809. She first appeared in Lloyd's Register (LR) in 1811 but was already reported to be trading between England and Spain in late 1809 and 1810 with masters Given and Wilson. USS Chesapeake captured and burnt her in 1813. The capture gave rise to two cases in US courts.

== Career ==
Liverpool Hero first appeared in Lloyd's Register in 1811, nominally trading with Spain. In reality, she was sailing from Spain to South America. On 23 April 1811 she arrived at Liverpool with a cargo of hides and horns from Buenos Aires. The Landing-Surveyor seized her because she could not immediately provide her license from the South Sea Company to trade in the South Seas. However, she did possess such a license, which the owners produced, securing her release.

Year	Master	Owner	Trade	Source & notes
1811	T.Davis	Fisher & Co.	Liverpool–Cadiz	LR
1812	T.Davis; Re_som	Fisher & Co.	Liverpool–Cadiz	LR; large repair 1809
1813	R.Sibsoe	Nerson & Co.	Liverpool–Brazils	LR; large repair 1809

Fate: Liverpool Hero was reported to have been taken on the coast of Brazil at the end of January 1813. She had been sailing from Liverpool to Maranham. Chesapeake had captured Liverpool Hero, divested part of her cargo, and burnt her.

On 12 January 1813 Chesapeake captured the British merchantman Volunteer. The next day Chesapeake boarded Liverpool Hero in an attempt to collect information regarding the remainder of the British convoy from which Liverpool Hero had parted. Captain Samuel Evans of Chesapeake put Liverpool Hero's cargo of dry goods on Chesapeake. He also took Liverpool Hero's mainmast to replace one of Chesapeake's main top masts that a storm a few days earlier had destroyed. He then had Liverpool Hero burnt. The crews of Volunteer and Liverpool Hero remained on Chesapeake as prisoners; Volunteer sailed to the United States under the command of a prize crew. Later, Evans paroled the masters of Volunteer and Liverpool Hero on a third prize, Earl Percy, and sent her to the United States also. (Note: Earl Percy ran on shore at Long Island. Goods with a value of about $250 were salvaged.)

Court cases: When Chesapeake returned to the United States carrying the cargo transferred from Liverpool Hero an issue arose concerning the payment of customs duties on foreign cargo taken in prize by a warship. The judge ruled that under the existing law, however ill-suited it was to issue, the half of the prize money accruing to Chesapeake's officers and crew was subject to customs duties. The half due to the United States government was to go into the fund for the payment of pensions to the navy.

A second case arose out Commodore Stephen Decatur's claim to a share of prize money due on captures by vessels of his squadron, most specifically Volunteer. This case was decided in Decatur's favor.
