= Macedonian Monument =

Monument at the US Naval Academy

- United States Naval Academy
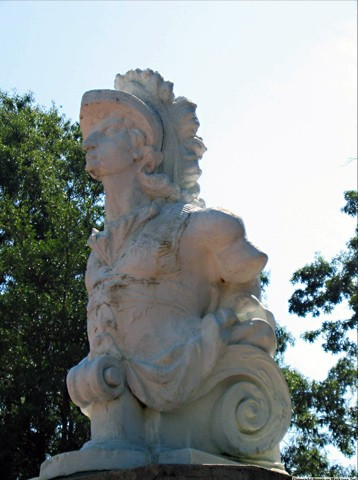
- Figurehead of HMS Macedonian; Campus of the US Naval Academy
- For the victory of the frigate United States over HMS Macedonian 25 October 1812
- Unveiled: circa 1810
- Location: 38°59′00″N 76°29′09″W; Annapolis, MD near Mahan Hall
- Designed by: unknown, bronze relief plaque by Edward Berge

The Macedonian Monument is on the campus of the United States Naval Academy, across the street from Mahan Hall, at the end of Stribling Walk. The monument's sculpture is a replica of the figurehead of HMS Macedonian, captured by Stephen Decatur and the American frigate United States in the opening days of the War of 1812. Also known as Alexander the Great and the Figurehead of Hans Macedonian, the original wooden sculpture dates to circa 1810. It came to the Academy in 1875. The modern replica was mounted in 2014 and the original was moved to Mahan Hall to protect it from the elements.

== Description ==
A wooden ship's figurehead from the captured British frigate "Macedonian" depicts a bust of Alexander the Great. The figure is dressed in a shirt with ruffles at the neck and a helmet adorned with long plumes. The sculpture is painted white and is installed atop a square stone base. Each side of the base is adorned with a curved stone bench. A green-painted cannon tube extends from each corner. The front of the base features a bronze relief plaque illustrating the capture of the "Macedonian"

The monument's size is 72 by 33 by 45 inches (1.83 m × 0.84 m × 1.14 m). The sculpture is wood, treated with epoxy resin, surmounting a stone base. The carver is unknown. Beneath the figurehead is a bronze relief of the engagement between the frigates United States and Macedonian by Edward Berge, created in 1924. The four cannons are 18-pounder long guns captured with HMS Macedonian.

== Inscriptions ==
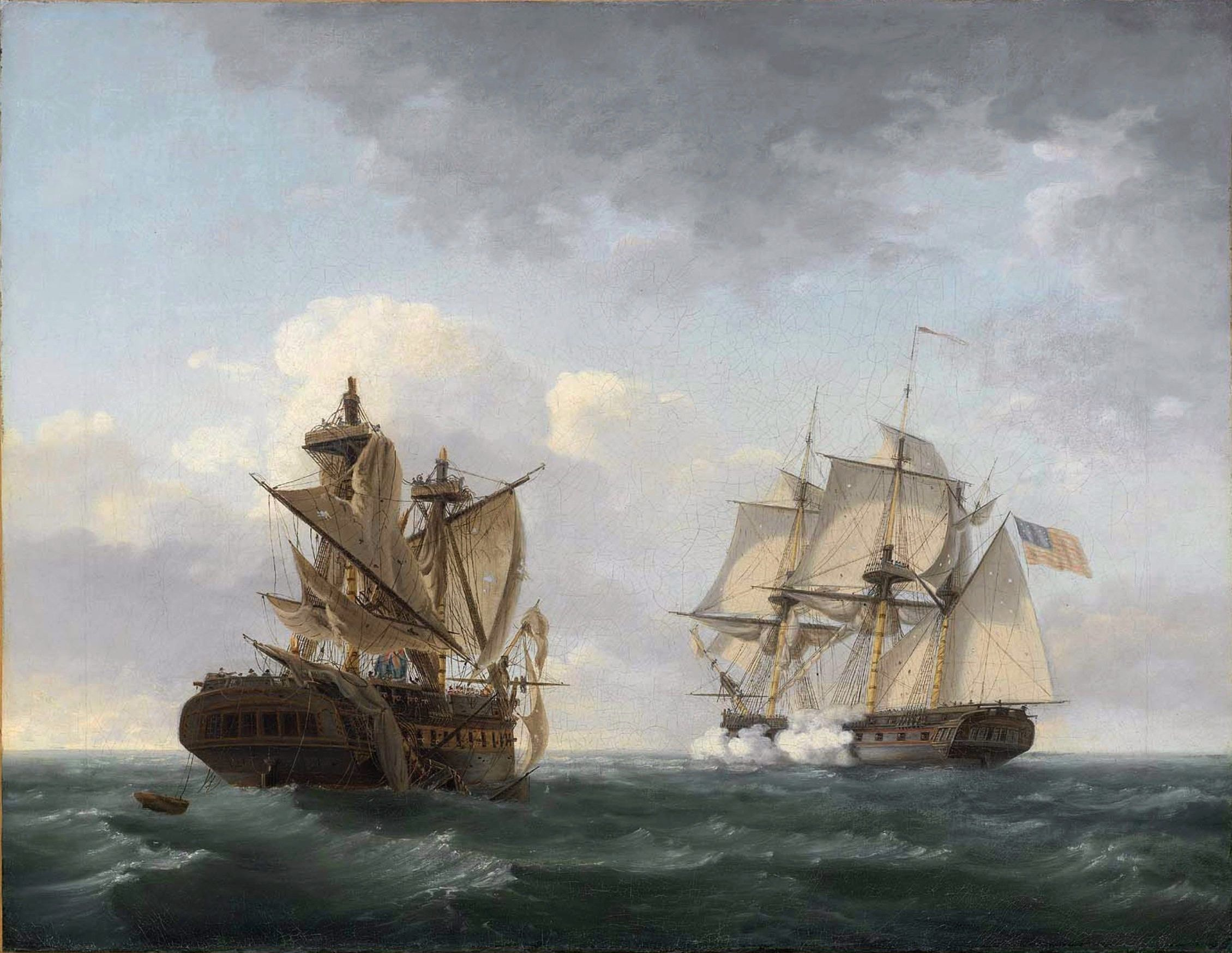
Thomas Birch's Engagement between the United States and the Macedonian

Berge's relief of the battle has eroded with time. It is a graphic very similar to Thomas Birch's Engagement between the "United States" and the "Macedonian", painted in 1813.

On the front of the base, facing Mahan Hall:

Capture Of The Macedonian
THE AMERICAN FRIGATE UNITED STATES
Commodore Stephen Decatur, cruising between the Azores and Cape
Verde Islands On October 25, 1812 Was Sighted By The British Frigate
MACEDONIAN
Captain John S. Carden And The Two Ships Joined Action. A Sanguinary
Fight Was Maintained When After Two Hours The Macedonian Losing
Her Mizzenmast And Main Topmast Became Unmanageable And With
104 Casualties Out Of A Total Of 254 And Many Of Her Guns Disabled
Hauled Down Her Colors.

Directly below is a small plaque:

Restored 1967
The Class Of
1925

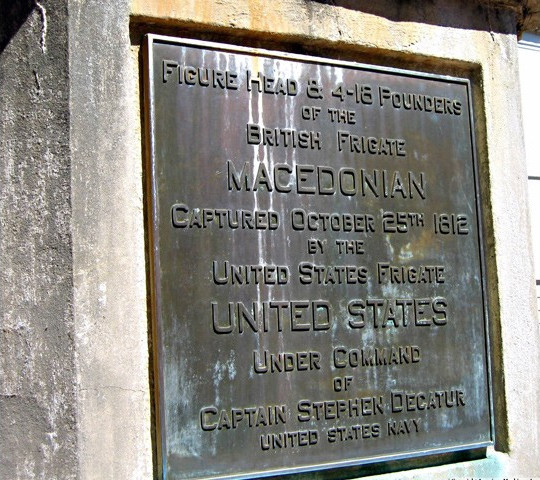
Plaque mounted opposite Mahan Hall

On the back of the base, facing Bancroft Hall:

Figurehead & 4–18 Pounders
of the
British Frigate
MACEDONIAN
Captured October 25th 1812
by the
United States Frigate
UNITED STATES
Under Command
of
Captain Stephen Decatur
United States Navy

== History ==
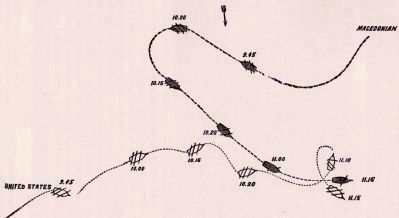
From Roosevelt's Naval War of 1812

The battle between the two frigates was an American victory. Macedonian, over-matched by every measure, was captured after a short fight. She became USS Macedonian, and served in the United States Navy until late 1828. Arriving in Virginia 30 October 1828, she was decommissioned and broken up at Gosport Navy Yard, Portsmouth, Va. Her keel became that of the US Navy's second Macedonian, a 36‑gun frigate started in 1832. Some time afterwards, the old Macedonian's figurehead became a monument at the shipyard. It was transferred to the Academy in 1875.

The monument was refreshened in 2014. The figurehead was replaced with a newly carved mahogany version, the benches were replaced, the concrete base was repaired, and the cannons and plaques were refurbished. The project cost $300,000, provided as a gift by the Academy class of 1973. The rededication ceremony was 25 April 2014.
