= USS United States vs HMS Macedonian =

Naval battle in the War of 1812

- Part of the War of 1812
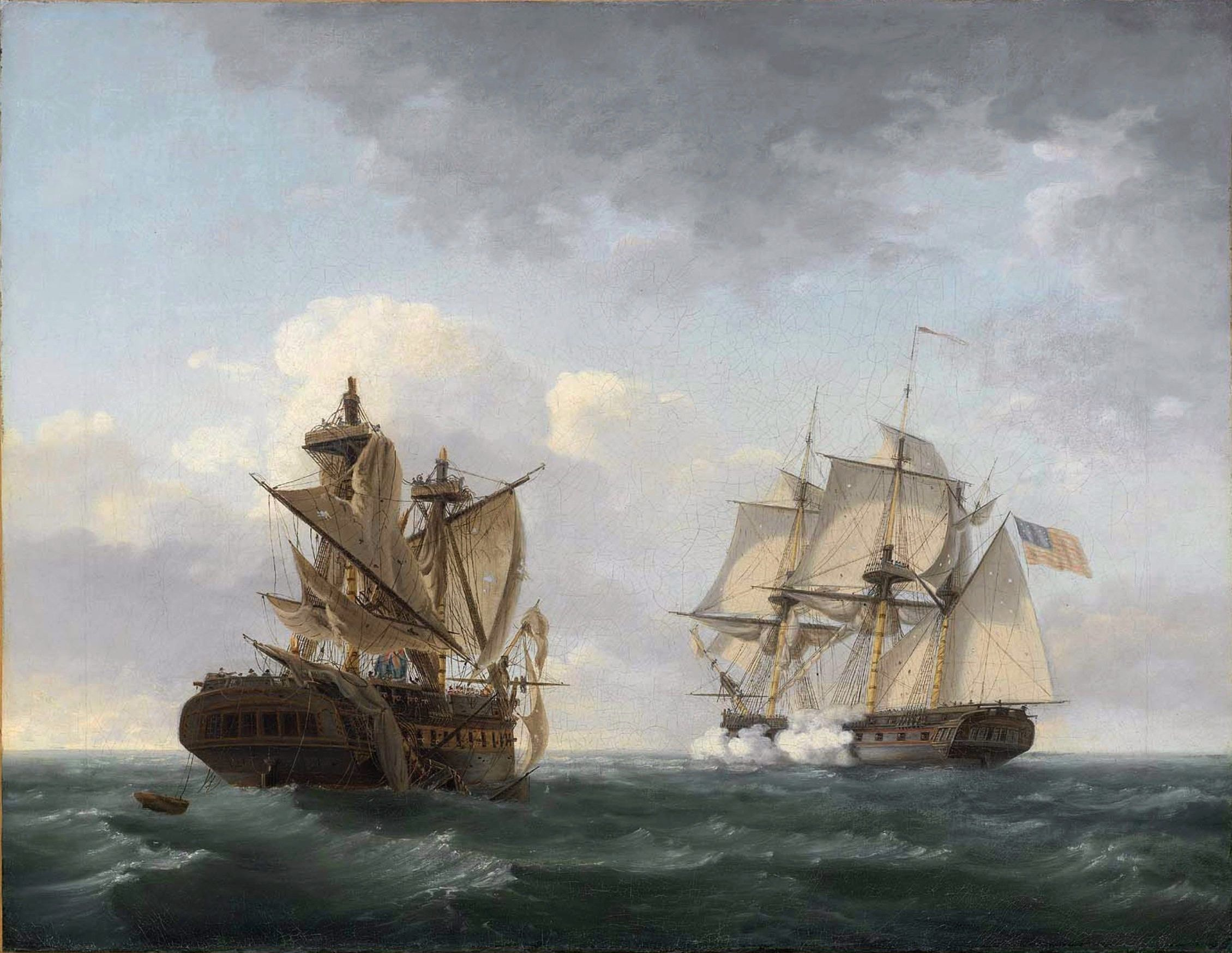
- Engagement between the United States and the Macedonian (Thomas Birch, 1813)
Date	25 October 1812
Location	Atlantic Ocean
Result	American victory

Belligerents
United States	United Kingdom

Commanders and leaders
(United States Navy) Stephen Decatur	(United Kingdom) John Surman Carden (surrendered)

Units involved
USS United States	HMS Macedonian

Strength
1 44-gun heavy frigate 428 marines and sailors	1 38-gun frigate 301 marines and sailors

Casualties and losses
7 killed 5 wounded	43 killed 71 wounded Macedonian captured

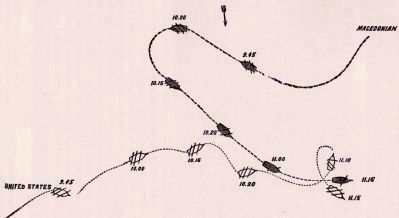
From Roosevelt's Naval War of 1812, the paths of United States and Macedonian, 25 October 1812

The capture of HMS Macedonian was a naval action fought near Madeira on 25 October 1812 between the heavy frigate USS United States, commanded by Stephen Decatur, and the frigate HMS Macedonian, under the command of John Surman Carden. The American vessel won the long bloody battle, capturing and bringing Macedonian back to the United States. It was the first British warship to ever be brought into an American harbor.

== Background ==
The United States declared war on the United Kingdom on 18 June 1812. United States, the frigate Congress, and the brig Argus joined Commodore John Rodgers's squadron at New York City and put to sea immediately, cruising off the east coast until the end of August. The squadron again sailed on 8 October 1812, this time from Boston. Three days later, after capturing Mandarin, United States parted company and continued to cruise eastward.

== Combatants ==
USS United States was the first of the six original frigates of the United States Navy, completed in 1797. She was a then-modern 'heavy frigate' design, which was intended to be powerful enough to defeat any contemporary French or British frigate whilst still being fast enough to evade any opposing ship of the line. Rated as a 44-gun vessel, the primary armament was thirty-two 24-pounder cannon mounted on the main gun deck. She had seen action during the Quasi-War of 1798–1800, capturing several small French vessels.

HMS Macedonian was a Lively-class frigate, of the Royal Navy's fifth rate. This was a successful design that had been used since 1804. Macedonian was the eleventh ship in the class, launched in 1810 just two years before the battle. Officially rated with 38 guns, the main armament was twenty-eight 18-pounder cannon. She had not previously seen action.

Although Macedonian was larger than the fifth-rate frigates used in earlier conflicts (such as the American Revolutionary War), she was still significantly smaller and more lightly armed than the United States. The American vessel's broadside totalled 864 pounds of shot, whilst the British vessel was only 528 pounds; the 24-pounders on the United States also had a longer effective range. The United States was the larger and more solidly built of the two, with 1576 tons burthen as opposed to Macedonian's 1082 tons burthen. The United States also carried a larger crew.

Comparison of combatant vessels (English measurement methods used for both ships;)

	HMS Macedonian	USS United States
Length (gundeck)	154 ft 0 in (46.94 m)	175 ft 0 in (53.34 m)
Beam	38 ft 9 in (11.81 m)	43 ft 6 in (13.26 m)
Tonnage	1082 tons	1576 tons
Complement	301 men	428 men
Armament	28 × 18-pounder long guns 14 × 32-pounder carronades 2 × 9-pounder chase guns 1 × 12-pounder boat carronade	30 × 24-pounder long guns 24 × 42-pounder carronades 2 × 24-pounder chase guns
Broadside Weight	528 lbs	864 lbs

== Battle ==
At dawn on 25 October, five hundred miles south of the Azores, lookouts on board United States reported seeing a sail 12 miles (19 km) to windward. As the ship rose over the horizon, Captain Decatur made out the fine, familiar lines of HMS Macedonian, which was on its way to its station in the West Indies.

Both ships were immediately cleared for action and commenced maneuvers at 0900. Captain Carden elected not to risk crossing the bows of United States to rake her, but chose instead to haul closer to the wind on a parallel course with the American vessel. For his part, Decatur intended to engage Macedonian from fairly long range, where his 24 pounders would have the advantage over the British 18 pounders, and then move in for the kill.

The actual battle developed according to Decatur's plan. United States began the action at 0920 by firing an inaccurate broadside. This was answered immediately by the British vessel, bringing down a small spar of United States. Decatur's next broadside had better luck, as it destroyed Macedonian's mizzen top mast, letting her driver gaff fall and so giving the maneuvering advantage to the American frigate. United States next took up position off Macedonian's quarter and proceeded to riddle the hapless frigate methodically with shot. She hailed Macedonian demanding the name of her antagonist and whether or not she surrendered. By noon, Macedonian was a dismasted hulk. When United States closed for another broadside, Carden was forced to strike her colors and surrender. She had had over 100 round shot lodged in her hull and suffered over one hundred casualties, one third of her crew, while United States only suffered 12. Because of the greater range of the guns aboard United States, she got off seventy broadsides to Macedonian's thirty, and emerged from the battle relatively unscathed.

== Aftermath ==
The two ships lay alongside each other for over two weeks while Macedonian was repaired sufficiently to sail. United States and her prize arrived at Newport, Rhode Island, on 4 December amid tumultuous national jubilation over the victory. Captain Decatur and his crew were lionized and received special praise from both Congress and President James Madison. Macedonian was subsequently purchased by the United States Navy, and was renamed USS Macedonian.

After repairs, United States sailed from New York on 24 May 1813, accompanied by USS Macedonian and the sloop Hornet. On 1 June, the three vessels were driven into New London, Connecticut, by the 74-gun ship HMS Valiant and the 40-gun frigate HMS Acasta, and United States and Macedonian were kept blockaded there until the end of the war. However, Decatur was transferred to the frigate President in the spring of 1814, and he took the officers and crew of United States with him to his new command. Hornet managed to slip through the blockade on 14 November 1814 and escaped to sea, but Decatur and the President were not as fortunate as they were captured by the blockading force on 14 January 1815.

== Bibliography ==
- Cooper, James Fenimore (1826). History of the navy of the United States of America.
  Stringer & Townsend, New York. p. 508. OCLC 197401914. Url
- Abbot, Willis John (1886). The Naval History of the United States.
  Peter Fenelon Collier, New York. OCLC 1667284. Url
- Borneman, Walter R. (2004). 1812: the war that forged a nation.
  Harper Collins, New York. pp. 349. ISBN 0-06-053112-6. Url
- Canney, Donald L. (2001). Sailing warships of the US Navy.
  Chatham Publishing / Naval Institute Press. p. 224. ISBN 1-55750-990-5. Url
