= John Carden =

John Carden may refer to:

- Sir John Carden, 6th Baronet (1892–1935), English tank and vehicle designer
- John Carden (baseball) (1921–1949), Major League Baseball pitcher
- John Carden (loyalist) (1740 -1782), was a British militia leader during the American Revolutionary War
- John Surman Carden (1771–1858), British Royal Navy officer
- John Carden (soccer), member of the U.S. soccer team at the 1956 Summer Olympics
- John Carden (Combat Sports Promoter) - Promoter of first state sanctioned bareknuckle bout in Kansas history. Professional boxing record 1-1. Brother of pro boxer Brian Carden.

== See also ==
- Carden baronets
- Carden (disambiguation)
