= Prince of Wales' American Regiment =

Loyalist militia in the American Revolution

Prince of Wales' American Regiment Prince of Wales' American Volunteers Prince of Wales' Royal American Volunteers
- Active: 1777-1783
- Country: Great Britain
- Allegiance: Great Britain
- Branch: British Provincial unit
- Type: Infantry
- Engagements: Ridgefield, Rhode Island, Charleston, Hanging Rock, Cowpens, Fort Granby

Commanders
- Notable commanders: General Montfort Browne; Major John Carden

The Prince of Wales' American Regiment was a volunteer regiment of Loyalists in the American Revolution organized in 1776 and 1777 by Montfort Browne, former governor of the Bahamas. Recruits were largely from among Connecticut Loyalists.

The regiment was initially based in the New York City area and saw early action in 1777 at the Battle of Ridgefield, in which the British destroyed American military supplies stored at Danbury, Connecticut. The regiment later participated in the Battle of Rhode Island in 1778.

When the British refocused their efforts on a southern strategy, the regiment was moved to South Carolina, where it participated in the Siege of Charleston in 1780.

The regiment saw its heaviest action at the Battle of Hanging Rock, in which the regiment, under the command of Major John Carden, contributed substantially to repulsing a surprise attack by the Continental Army under the command of General Thomas Sumter. Although the battle was a tactical victory, the Prince of Wales' American Regiment suffered heavy casualties. In addition, Major Carden was disgraced for resigning his command in the heat of battle. Portions of the regiment later served at the Battle of Cowpens and the Siege of Fort Granby.

The regiment remained in South Carolina until late 1782, when it returned to New York. The regiment was disbanded on October 10, 1783. Over 150 members of the regiment, along with family and servants, resettled in New Brunswick, Canada. The community of Prince of Wales, New Brunswick was named for the regiment by Lieutenant Colonel Gabriel DeVeber, who settled there with his family.
