= HMS Macedonian =

Lively-class frigate of the Royal Navy

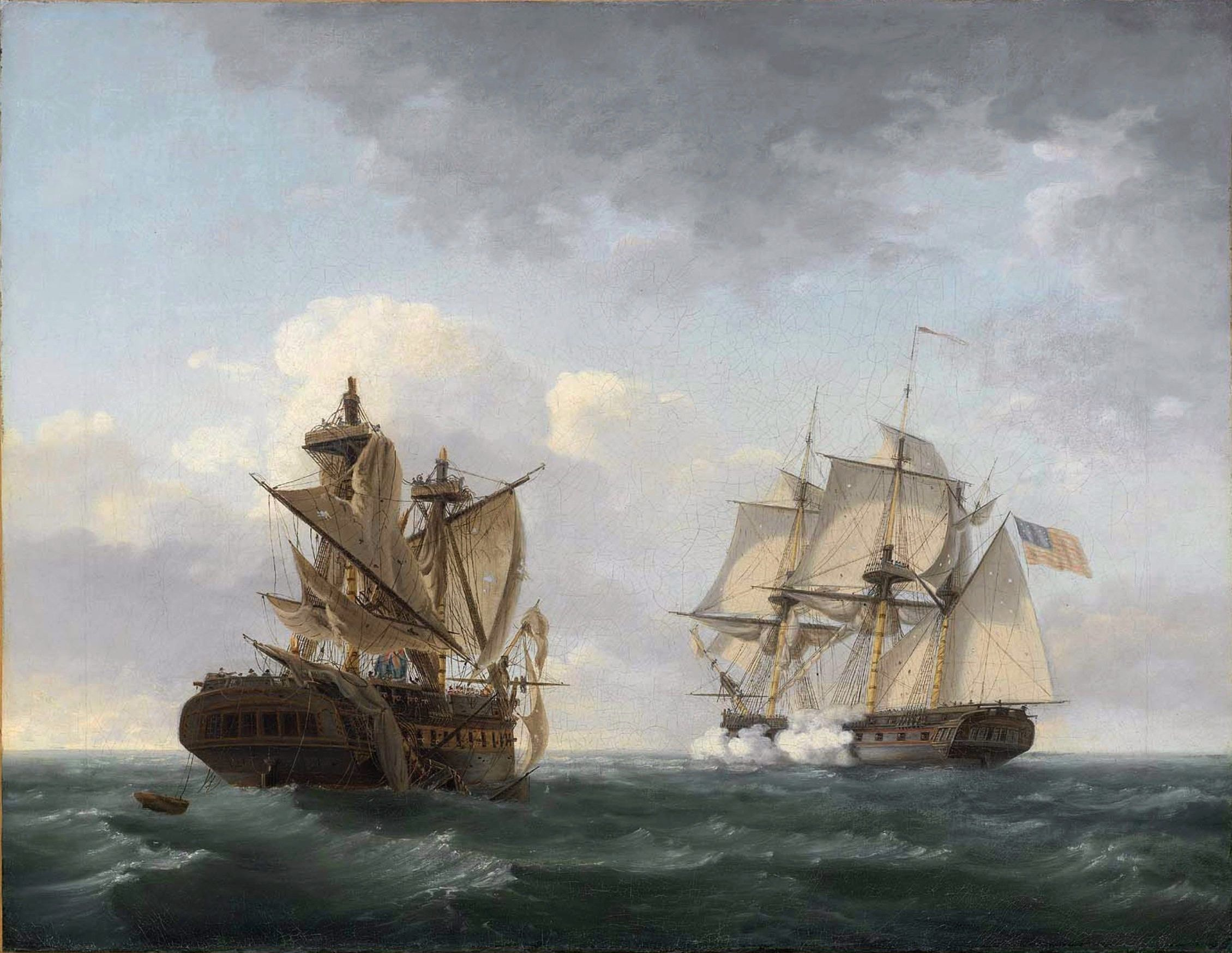
- Engagement between the United States and the Macedonian, by Thomas Birch, 1813

History

United Kingdom
- Name: HMS Macedonian
- Ordered: 28 September 1808
- Builder: Woolwich Dockyard
- Laid down: May 1809
- Launched: 2 June 1810
- Out of service: 25 October 1812
- Fate: Captured

United States
- Name: USS Macedonian
- Acquired: 25 October 1812
- Commissioned: April 1813
- Decommissioned: 1828
- Fate: Broken up, 1834

General characteristics
- Class & type: Lively-class frigate
- Tons burthen: 1082 bm
- Length: 154 ft (47 m)
- Beam: 38 ft 9 in (11.81 m)
- Draft: 18 ft 4 in (5.59 m)
- Propulsion: Sail
- Complement: 306
- Armament: rated as 38 guns 28 × 18-pounder guns 14 × 32-pounder carronades

HMS Macedonian was a 38-gun fifth-rate Lively-class frigate in the Royal Navy, later captured by the USS United States during the War of 1812.

== Construction and commissioning ==
Macedonian was built at Woolwich Dockyard, England in 1809, launched 2 June 1810, and commissioned the same month. She was commanded by Captain Lord William FitzRoy. Among the original crew was the 13-year-old Samuel Leech, who later wrote a memoir of his experiences.

== As HMS Macedonian ==
Macedonian first delivered a company of soldiers to Lisbon, Portugal, then remained in the area, guarding against the possibility of French naval attack. On 20 February 1811, she collided with Ives – a British merchant ship bound from Demerara on the north coast of South America to Greenock, Scotland – in the Atlantic Ocean 50 nautical miles (93 km; 58 mi) off Lisbon, and Ives was so severely damaged that she was set afire and Macedonian took her crew aboard. While Macedonian operated off Portugal, FitzRoy made personal profit by falsification of records of ships' stores, for which he was court-martialled in March 1811 and dismissed from the service. (He was quietly reinstated in August 1811, presumably due to his aristocratic rank).

FitzRoy's replacement, William Waldegrave, was an interim appointment whose command lasted for only a few weeks before he was himself replaced by John Surnam Carden. One of Carden's first actions was to hire a band, a move popular with the crew, but he did not get along with the first lieutenant David Hope.

In January 1812, Macedonian was ordered to secretly deliver some bills of exchange to Norfolk, Virginia, and to bring back an equivalent quantity of gold and silver currency, as part of a scheme to keep the Bank of England solvent. During the visit, Carden socialised with the notables of Norfolk, including Captain Stephen Decatur, but bungled the mission by inadvertently revealing what was planned, and had to return to Lisbon empty handed. Captain Carden dined frequently with Decatur and his wife Susan and jokingly bet a beaver hat on the outcome of a battle of their ships. They had come to consider one another friends.

In September 1812, Macedonian was ordered to accompany an East Indiaman as far as Madeira, then to cruise in search of prizes as long as his supplies permitted.

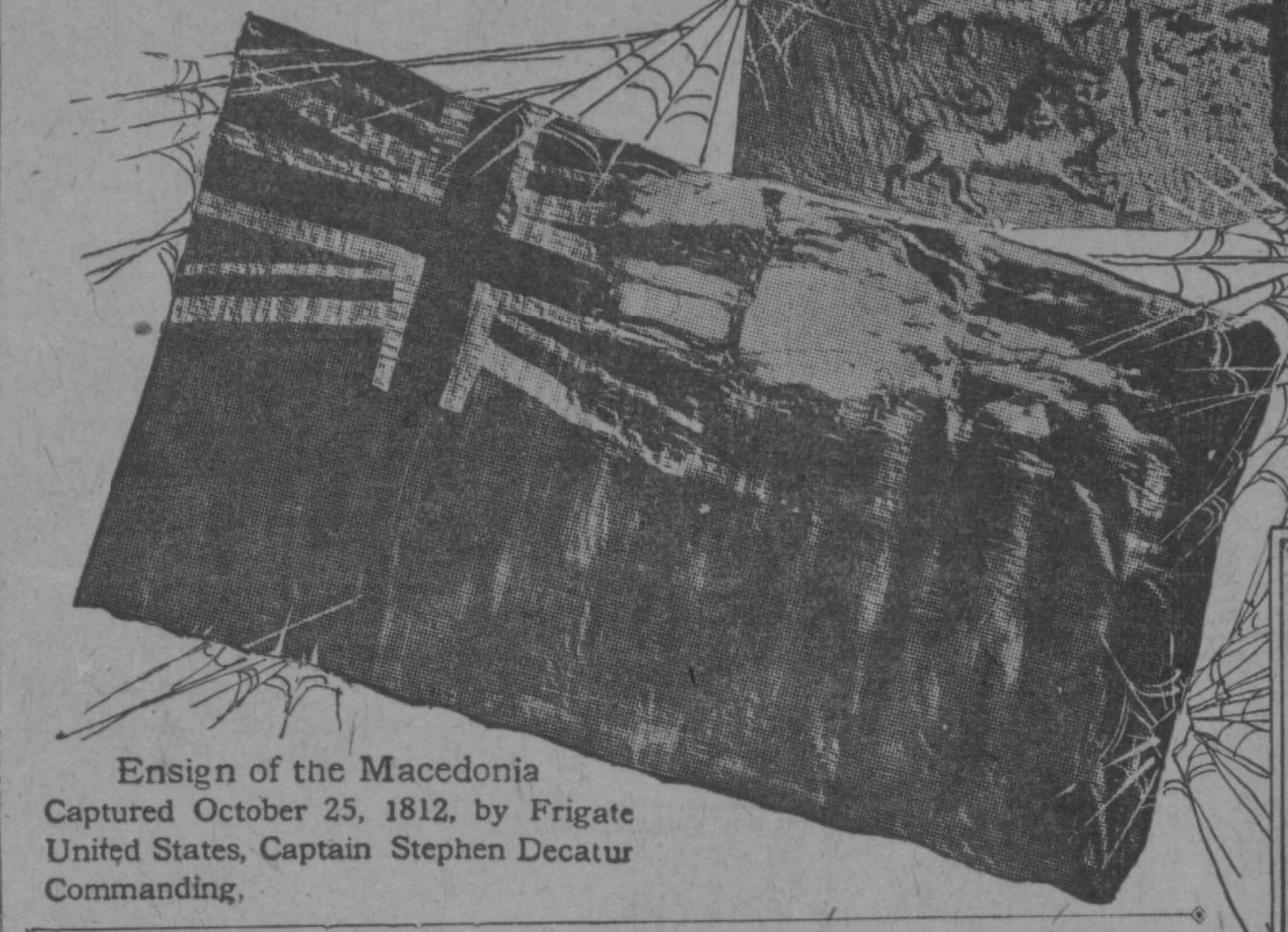
Ship's flag, 1812

=== Loss to USS United States ===
Macedonian left Madeira on 22 October 1812, but only a few days later, on the morning of 25 October, encountered USS United States, commanded by Carden's former dinner host Decatur. The United States had just declared war on the United Kingdom, and both captains were eager to achieve personal glory in a fight.

Unfortunately for Macedonian, United States was a 44-gun heavy frigate, and her broadside was 864 pounds (392 kg) of metal, versus Macedonian's 528 pounds (239 kg). USS United States hove round, turning downwind and making HMS Macedonian chase her. Within a few minutes of closing, fire from United States's 24-pounder cannons brought down all three of Macedonian's masts, and riddled the hull. United States then pulled away temporarily, leaving Carden and Hope time to contemplate their lack of options. Finally, with United States preparing to rake the British vessel again, Carden struck his colors, making Macedonian the second Royal Navy vessel to surrender to the Americans during the war.

== As USS Macedonian ==
Decatur was careful to preserve Macedonian, sending over a detail to help repair her. This took a full two weeks. Decatur then brought the captured ship into Newport, Rhode Island, as a prize on 4 December 1812, causing an immediate national sensation. USS Constitution had previously beaten HMS Guerriere, but Guerriere had been too badly damaged to save. Macedonian was a sizable and welcome addition to the then tiny US Navy.

Macedonian was immediately taken into the United States Navy, retaining the name as Macedonian under the command of Captain Jacob Jones.

Early in May after receiving hasty repairs Macedonian, along with United States and the sloop Hornet hoped to make their way to sea from the anchorage of Staten Island by way of Sandy Hook but were unable because of the British Blockade. Two ships of the line and three frigates were guarding that passage. Decatur, determined, took his squadron and crossing New York harbor made his way up the East River by way of Hell Gate, New York, 24 May 1813. While sailing along Long Island Sound on the night of 24 May the flagship United States was struck by lightning, causing damage to the main mast, which came crashing down and caused serious damage to the vessel. Macedonian, being close by, immediately distanced herself from the periled United States. After hasty repairs the fleet continued on their way eastward along the Sound. Because of unfavorable winds and a passage not favorable to heavy vessels, the fleet finally reached Montauk Point, the easternmost point of Long Island. The open sea was now before them but the British had blockading vessels there lying in wait. Outmatched, the fleet had no alternative but to turn back, making their way to the Thames River, where Macedonian and the rest of the fleet remained until the end of the war.

On 20 May 1815 she departed for the Mediterranean to join Commodore Decatur's 10-ship squadron in the Second Barbary War in Algeria, a renewal of naval action against the Barbary powers, to stop harassment of American shipping. On 17 June the frigate assisted in the capture of the Algerian flagship, the frigate Mashuda, by frigates Constellation and Guerriere, the sloops-of-war Epervier and Ontario.

The signing of a treaty with Tunis and Tripoli on 7 August, following that with Algeria in June, won maritime freedom in the Mediterranean. The next three years Macedonian patrolled there and off the East Coast.

From January 1819 to March 1821 the frigate operated off the Pacific coast of South America, giving aid and protection to the commercial ships in the area during the disorders following the Latin American colonial revolts, before returning to Boston in June 1821.

During this period she worked as a banking ship, doing business with privateers of every kind. Captain Downes often kept his midshipmen and other trusted aides busy counting specie. Many deposits were made, with many single deposits of over 100,000.

The men complained bitterly about their treatment, writing of how they were forced to eat mealy grain while counting hundreds of thousands of dollars in specie. Many of the men felt that Captain Downes was doing this for the "good of the Captain" and wondered when they would be used for the purpose they joined the Navy for rather than for the Captain's personal enrichment.

On 2 April 1822 the Macedonian left Boston as part of Commodore James Biddle's West Indies Squadron. Secretary of the Navy Smith Thompson had assigned the squadron to guard United States merchant shipping and suppress piracy. During their deployment seventy six of the Macedonian officers and men died. Seventy four of these deaths were by yellow fever. Biddle reported another fifty two of his crew were on sick-list. In their report to the Secretary of the Navy, Commodore Biddle and Surgeon's Mate Dr. Charles Chase state the cause as "fever". As a consequence of this loss Biddle noted his squadron was forced to return to Norfolk Navy Yard early. The Macedonian crew upon arrival were provided medical care and quarantined at Craney Island

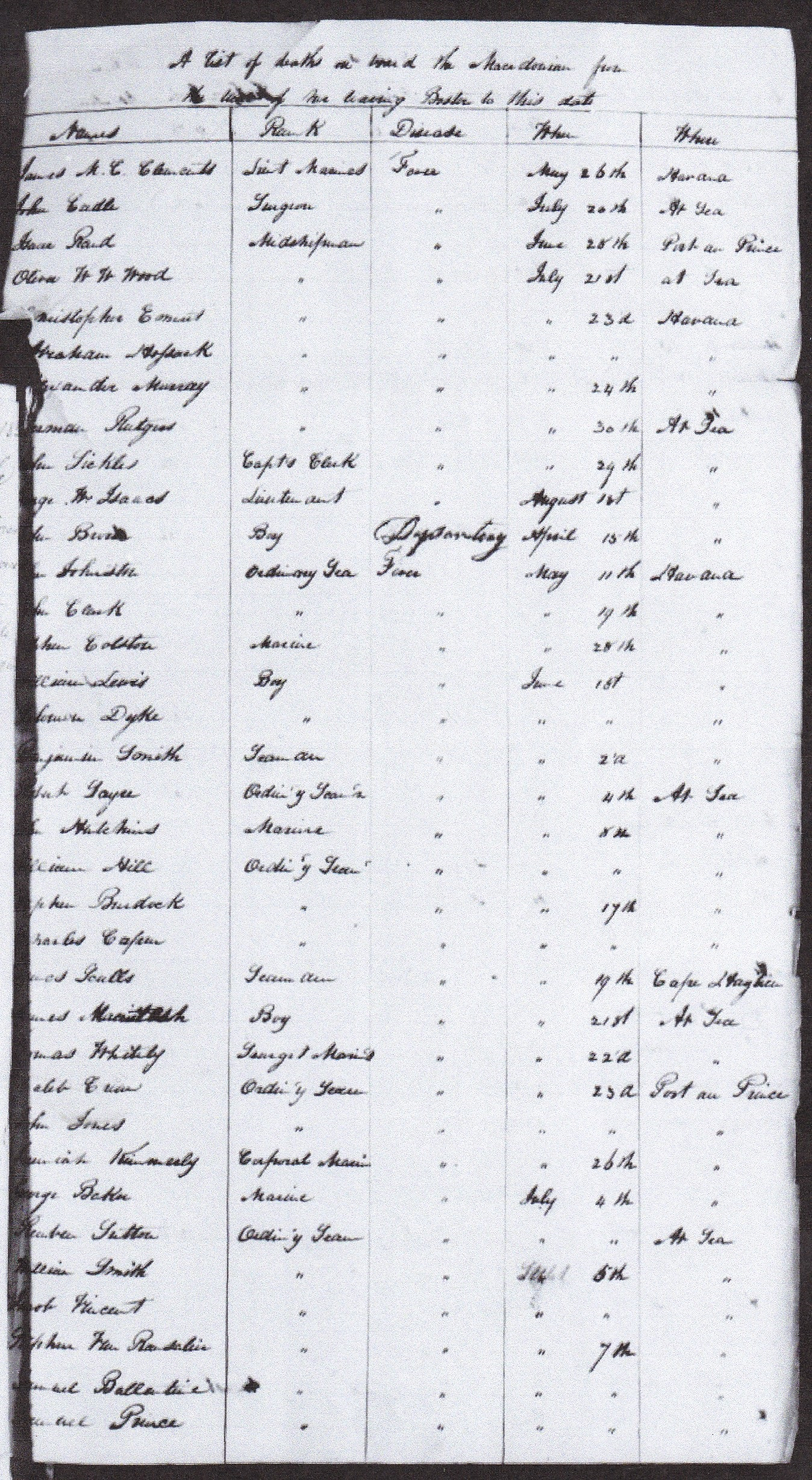
A page from Commodore James Biddle's list of the seventy six dead aboard USS Macedonian 3 August 1822

She next cruised in the West Indies, where she helped suppress piracy, into 1826.

On 11 June 1826 Macedonian departed Norfolk for service on the Pacific station, returning to Hampton Roads, 30 October 1828. She was decommissioned in 1828 and was broken up at the Norfolk Navy Yard. The crew for this final voyage included William Henry Leonard Poe, brother of American writer Edgar Allan Poe. HMS Macedonian's captured ensign was on display at Mahan Hall at the U.S. Naval Academy, but was removed on 27 February 2018 for preservation.

== See also ==
- USS United States vs HMS Macedonian
- List of frigate classes of the Royal Navy
- List of ships captured in the 19th century

== Bibliography ==
- Canney, Donald L. (2001). Sailing warships of the US Navy. Chatham Publishing / Naval Institute Press. p. 224. ISBN 1-55750-990-5.
- "Macedonian I (Frigate)". Dictionary of American Naval Fighting Ships. Department of the Navy – Naval Historical Center.
- de Kay, James T. (1995). Chronicles of the Frigate Macedonian. New York: W.W. Norton.
- Gardiner, Robert (2006). Frigates of the Napoleonic Wars. Naval Institute Press. p. 208. ISBN 9781591142836.
- Hill, Frederic Stanhope (1905). Twenty-six historic ships. G.P. Putnam's Sons, New York and London. p. 515. OCLC 1667284.
- MacKenzie, Alexander Slidell (1846). Life of Stephen Decatur: a commodore in the Navy of the United States. C. C. Little and J. Brown, 1846 – Biography & Autobiography. p. 443.
