= Battle of Hanging Rock =

1780 battle of the American Revolutionary War

- Part of the American Revolutionary War
- Illustration of the battle
Date	August 6, 1780
Location	Lancaster County, South Carolina 34°33′56.4″N 80°39′42.45″W
Result	American victory

Belligerents
Great Britain	United States

Commanders and leaders
(Kingdom of Great Britain) John Carden	(United States) Thomas Sumter

Strength
1,400 regulars and militia	800 militia

Casualties and losses
192 killed or wounded	12 killed 41 wounded

The Battle of Hanging Rock took place on August 6, 1780 during the American Revolutionary War between Patriot and Loyalist troops. It was part of a campaign by militia General Thomas Sumter to harass or destroy British and Loyalist outposts in the South Carolina back-country that had been established after the fall of Charleston in May 1780.

In 2026, the Hanging Rock Revolutionary War Battlefield was listed in the National Trust for Historic Preservation's annual "America’s 11 Most Endangered Historic Places" due to lack of protections and expanding real estate development in the area.

== Background ==
Throughout 1779 and early 1780, Britain's "southern strategy" to regain control of its rebellious North American colonies went well, with British forces capturing Savannah and Charleston and a routing the remaining Continental Army troops in South Carolina at the Battle of Waxhaws. The British, in complete control of both South Carolina and Georgia, established outposts in the interior of both states to recruit Loyalists and to suppress Patriot activities. One outpost was established at Hanging Rock in present-day Lancaster County, South Carolina. The most northerly of the British posts, it was well fortified with more than 1,400 Loyalist troops, including 500 regulars of the Prince of Wales' American Regiment, local Loyalist militia, and several dragoons of the British Legion. These forces were under the overall command of Major John Carden.

The Americans were under Brigadier General Thomas Sumter, commanding troops made up of Major Richard Winn's Fairfield regiment, Colonel Edward Lacey's Chester regiment, Colonel William Hill's York regiment and Major William Richardson Davie of the Waxhaws of Lancaster county with Col. Robert Irwin's cavalry of Mecklenburg county, North Carolina. On August 1, 1780, Sumter launched an attack on the Loyalist outpost at Rocky Mount, west of Hanging Rock on the Catawba River. As part of this attack Sumter detached Major Davie on a diversionary attack on Hanging Rock. Davie attacked a fortified house, and captured 60 horses and a number of weapons. This, however, did not prevent the British from sending troops from Hanging Rock to reinforce the garrison there. After his assault on Rocky Mount failed, Sumter decided to make an attack on the weakened Hanging Rock outpost.

== Battle ==
Sumter decided on a plan of attack of assaulting the camp in three mounted detachments. Early in the morning, the initial assault was made where Winn's and Davie's men completely routed the Loyalist militia. Capt. After presenting a volley, McCulloch's company of the British Legion was also routed by Sumter's riflemen. The Prince of Wales' American Regiment also came under heavy fire and suffered very severe losses. Part of the regiment then came up and having cleverly deployed themselves in some woods, checked the American assault with a surprise crossfire. This allowed the Loyalists to draw up in a hollow square in the center of the cleared ground and further protect themselves with a three-pound cannon left by some of Rugeley's Camden militia.

In the heat of the battle, Carden lost his nerve and surrendered his command to one of his junior officers. This was a major turning point for the Americans. At one point, Capt. Rousselet of the British Legion's infantry led a charge and forced many Sumter's men back. Lack of ammunition made it impossible for Sumter to completely defeat the Loyalists. The battle raged for 3 hours without pause, causing many men to faint from the heat and thirst.

== Aftermath ==
The Loyalists ultimately suffered 192 men killed or wounded; the Americans lost 12 killed and 41 wounded. A group of American troops came across a storage of rum in the Loyalist camp and became so drunk they could not be brought back into the battle; thus, the intoxicated Americans left the field of battle and marched back to the base camp at Waxhaw. The battle site has been listed on the National Register of Historic Places. It is managed by the South Carolina Department of Natural Resources. The American Battlefield Trust and its partners have acquired and preserved 172 acres (0.70 km^{2}) of the battlefield through mid-2023.

== See also ==
- American Revolutionary War § War in the South. Places ' Battle of Hanging Rock ' in overall sequence and strategic context.
