= John Surman Carden =

Royal Navy Admiral (1771–1858)

Admiral John Surman Carden
- Admiral John Surman Carden. Frontispiece to Memoirs - see Further Reading below
- Born: 15 August 1771; Tewkesbury, Gloucestershire
- Died: 22 April 1858 (aged 86); Ballycastle, County Antrim
- Relatives: John Carden (father)
- Military career
- Allegiance: Kingdom of Great Britain; United Kingdom
- Branch: Royal Navy
- Service years: 1788–1837
- Rank: Admiral
- Conflicts: French Revolutionary Wars; Glorious First of June; Capture of Immortalite; Napoleonic Wars; War of 1812; Action of 25 October 1812

Admiral John Surman Carden (15 August 1771 – 22 April 1858) was an officer of the British Royal Navy in the early nineteenth century. Although the majority of his service was against the French during the Napoleonic Wars, he is best remembered for the action of 25 October 1812, an engagement against a larger American frigate during the War of 1812 in which his ship HMS Macedonian was captured. Carden was criticised for the loss of his ship, specifically his handling of the vessel during the action. Following his defeat in October 1812 he never served again in an active capacity, but he remained in the Navy and continued to gradually rise though the ranks in retirement, eventually becoming a full admiral before his death in 1858.

== Life ==
Carden was born in 1771, the son of Army officer Major John Carden of Tredington Court in Tewkesbury. Carden spent his childhood at home, his mother refusing to allow him to become a pageboy in the household of Queen Charlotte and also resisted orders to enlist him in his father's regiment at the age of eight. Both his parents died while he was young: his mother died aged only 26, while his father was killed in action during the American Revolutionary War. Carden was educated privately until he was 17, when he enlisted in the Royal Navy in 1788, joining HMS Edgar under Captain Charles Thompson and later moving to the frigate HMS Perseverance under Captain Isaac Smith. In 1790 he became a midshipman and in 1793, at the outbreak of the French Revolutionary Wars, he moved to the ship of the line HMS Marlborough under Captain George Cranfield Berkeley.

Marlborough served in the Channel Fleet, and in 1794 was heavily engaged at the battle of the Glorious First of June, at which Carden was badly wounded in an ammunition explosion, suffering permanent damage to his eyesight. In March 1795 he moved to HMS Formidable and 1797 to HMS Barfleur under Captain James Richard Dacres. In 1798 he briefly moved to Thompson's flagship HMS Queen Charlotte before becoming a lieutenant in the frigate HMS Fisgard under Captain Thomas Byam Martin. Fisgard was employed in the aftermath of the Battle of Tory Island, successfully engaging and capturing the French frigate Immortalité off Brest, for which Carden was promoted to commander.

In 1799, Carden took command of the armed storeship HMS Sheerness, operating off the Netherlands and subsequently the Vendée region of France. He later convoyed troopships to the Red Sea in support of the Egyptian campaign, and was commended for clearing a gunpowder store on the burning transport Bombay, saving many lives. During the Peace of Amiens he served with the sea fencibles at the Firth of Forth and returned to sea in 1804 as the commander of HMS Moselle. In 1806, Carden became a post captain, but was not given command of a ship until August 1808, when he took over the massive 110-gun HMS Ville de Paris. In Ville de Paris he assisted in the evacuation of the British Army from Spain, following the Battle of Corunna in January 1809. In April 1809 he took over HMS Ocean and the following year moved to HMS Mars before gaining a permanent command in the frigate HMS Macedonian.

In October 1812, not long after the breakout of the War of 1812, Macedonian was intercepted in the mid-Atlantic by USS United States, a much larger American frigate. In the ensuing battle, Macedonian was severely damaged and suffered 104 casualties before Carden surrendered to the American ship. Macedonian was taken back to the United States, and on his return to Britain, Carden was subject to the usual court martial for the loss of his ship. Although acquitted of any culpability for the loss of his frigate, Carden was criticised for his handling of the ship during the battle and did not serve at sea again. However Parliament soon resounded with his praises and, among other marks of respect, he was honoured with the freedom of the cities of Worcester and Gloucester and of the borough of Tewkesbury.

Very little is known of Carden's life beyond that he was once married and had a daughter, Jemima (born c. 1800). Carden remained in the Navy despite the lengthy period of inaction and in 1836 was superannuated, a form of retirement. He was promoted to rear-admiral the same year and although he was subsequently reinstated in the Navy and continued to receive promotions based on his seniority, he did not hold any further naval position. He died in County Antrim in 1858, at the age of 86 with the rank of full admiral.
