= USS United States (1797) =

First of the six original frigates of the U.S. Navy

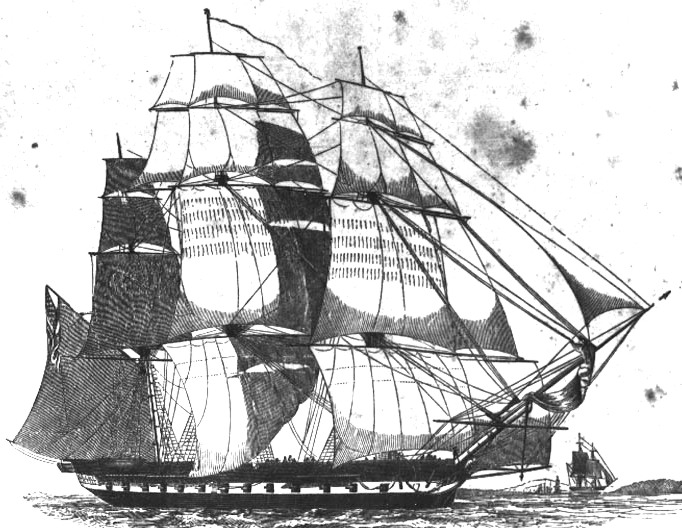
- USS United States by 1852

History

United States
- Name: USS United States
- Namesake: United States
- Ordered: 27 March 1794
- Builder: Joshua Humphreys
- Cost: $299,336
- Launched: 10 May 1797
- Nickname(s): "Old Wagon"
- Fate: Abandoned 20 April 1861
- Notes: First Commander: Captain John Barry

Confederate States of AmericaConfederate States
- Name: CSS United States
- Acquired: 20 April 1861
- Fate: Abandoned May 1862

United States
- Name: USS United States
- Acquired: May 1862
- Fate: Broken up December 1865

General characteristics
- Class & type: First class frigate
- Tons burthen: 1576 tons
- Length: 304 ft (93 m) bowsprit to spanker; 175 ft (53 m) between perpendiculars
- Beam: 43 ft 6 in (13.26 m)
- Draft: 23 ft 6 in (7.16 m) aft
- Depth of hold: 14 feet, 3 inches
- Decks: Orlop, Berth, Gun, Spar
- Propulsion: Sail
- Speed: 11 kn (20 km/h; 13 mph)
- Complement: 400 to 600 officers, enlisted personnel and 50 Marines
- Armament: 30 × 24-pounders (11 kg), 14 × 12-pounders (Quasi War), 32 × long 24-pounders (11 kg), 24 × 42-pounder (19 kg) carronades (War of 1812)

USS United States was a wooden-hulled, three-masted heavy frigate of the United States Navy and the first of the six original frigates authorized for construction by the Naval Act of 1794. The name "United States" was among ten names submitted to President George Washington by Secretary of War Timothy Pickering in March 1795 for the frigates that were to be constructed. Joshua Humphreys designed the frigates to be the young Navy's capital ships, and so United States and her sisters were larger and more heavily armed and built than typical frigates of the period. She was built at Humphrey's shipyard in Philadelphia, Pennsylvania and launched on 10 May 1797 and immediately began duties with the newly formed United States Navy protecting American merchant shipping during the Quasi-War with France.

In 1861, United States was in port at Norfolk when she was seized by the Virginia Navy. She was commissioned into the Confederate navy as CSS United States, but was later scuttled by Confederate forces. The U.S. Navy raised United States after retaking Norfolk, Virginia, but the aged and damaged ship was not returned to service; instead, United States was held at the Norfolk Navy Yard until she was broken up in December 1865.

== Design and construction ==
During the 1790s American merchant vessels began to fall prey to Barbary pirates in the Mediterranean, most notably from Algiers. Congress's response was the Naval Act of 1794. The Act provided funds for the construction of six frigates; however, it included a clause stating that construction of the ships would cease if the United States agreed to peace terms with Algiers.

Joshua Humphreys' design was deep, long on keel and narrow of beam (width) for mounting very heavy guns. The design incorporated a diagonal scantling (rib) scheme to limit hogging while giving the ships extremely heavy planking. This gave the hull greater strength than those of more lightly built frigates. Humphreys developed his design after realizing that the fledgling United States could not match the navy sizes of the European states. He therefore designed his frigates to be able to overpower other frigates, but with the speed to escape from a ship of the line.

Originally designated as "Frigate A" and subsequently named United States by President George Washington, her keel was laid down in 1795 at Humphreys' shipyard in Philadelphia Pennsylvania. Humphreys was assigned as her constructor and John Barry as its captain and was the first commissioned Captain of the newly established U.S. Navy. As Philadelphia was at the time America's capital, many visitors walked through observing her construction as it progressed. Humphreys personally led President Washington and First Lady Martha on a tour. The President expressed his admiration of the great size of the ship. A less desirable visitor, Benjamin Franklin Bache (grandson of Benjamin Franklin) was physically assaulted by Clement Humphreys (Joshua's son) allegedly over Bache's opposition to the Federalist Party and his opposition newspaper, the Philadelphia Aurora.

Fearing sabotage, Humphreys was concerned about the open nature of his ship yard which allowed anyone to wander in. He requested from the War Department a number of guards which were posted to keep out visitors but to little effect.

Construction slowly continued until a peace treaty was announced between the United States and Algiers in March 1796. In accordance with the clause in the Naval Act, construction of United States was discontinued. President Washington requested instructions from Congress on how to proceed. Several proposals circulated before a final decision was reached allowing Washington to complete the three frigates nearest to completion; United States, Constellation and Constitution were chosen.

On 10 May 1797 she was the first American warship to be launched under the Naval Act of 1794, and the first ship of the United States Navy. She was fitted out at Philadelphia during the spring of 1798 and, on 3 July ordered to proceed to sea. Relations with the French government had deteriorated, starting the Quasi-War.

=== Armament ===
United States's nominal rating was that of a 44-gun ship. However, she usually carried over 50 guns. United States was originally armed with a battery of 55 guns: thirty-two 24-pounder (10.9 kg) cannon; twenty-two 42-pounder (19 kg) carronades; and one 18-pounder (8 kg) long gun.

Unlike modern naval vessels, ships of this era had no permanent battery of guns. Guns were portable and often exchanged between ships as situations warranted. Each commanding officer modified his vessel's armaments to his liking, taking into consideration factors such as the overall tonnage of cargo, complement of personnel aboard, and planned routes to be sailed. Consequently, a vessel's armament would change often during its career; records of the changes were not generally kept.

== Quasi-War ==
United States sailed with Delaware to Boston where they were to meet with USS Herald and Pickering to form a patrol squadron. Shortly afterward Barry sighted a frigate flying French colors. Raising his own French flag, Barry maneuvered closer and when reaching it, hoisted the American colors. As Barry was about to open fire on the frigate, she hoisted British colors and identified herself as HMS Thetis, preventing an engagement from occurring. When reaching Boston, Barry learned that Herald and Pickering were not ready to sail and he decided to continue without them. United States and Delaware departed for the West Indies on 26 July

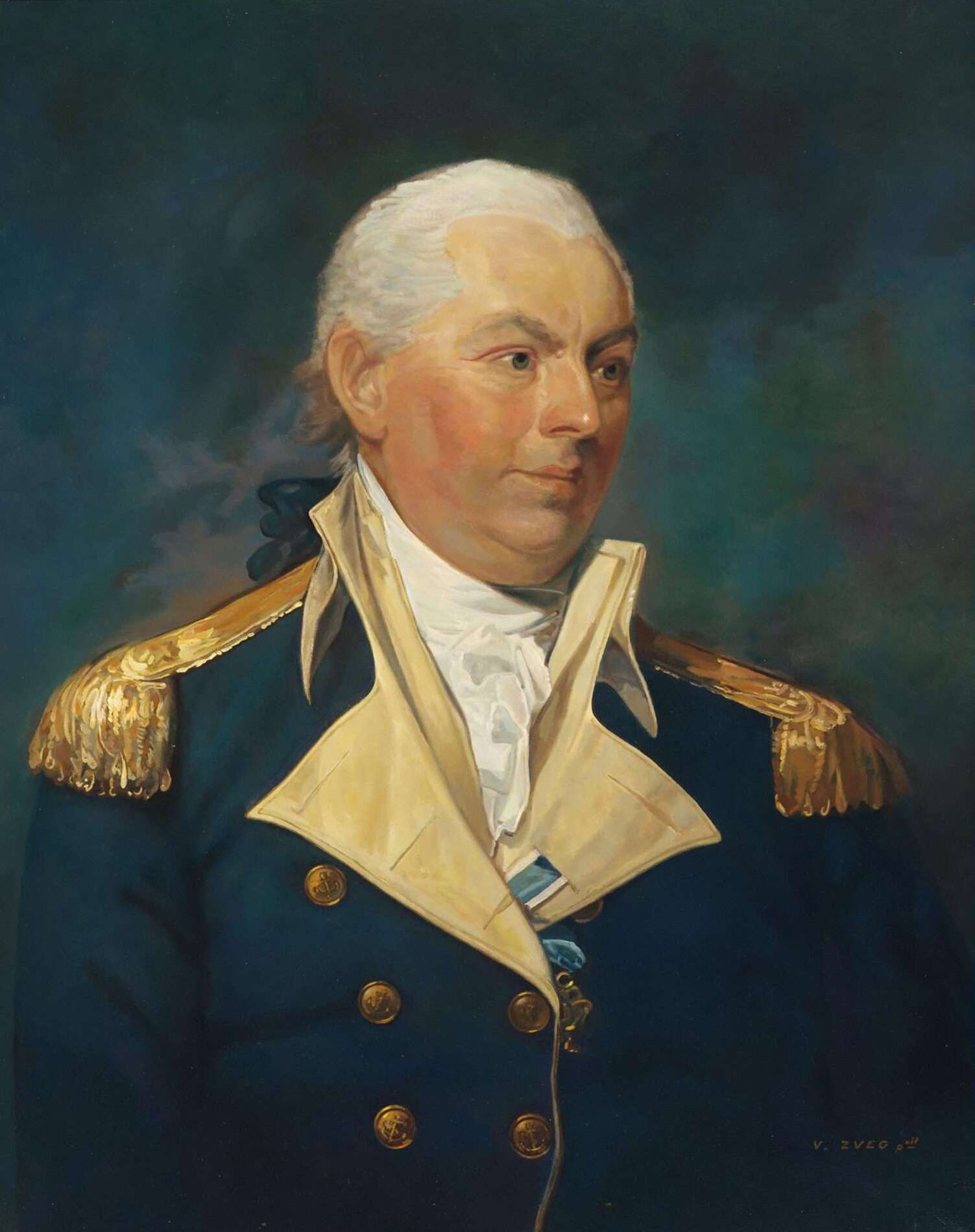
Portrait of John Barry c. 1801

In the ensuing two months two French privateers were captured, Sans Pareil on 23 August and Jalouse on 5 September and brought into New Castle, Delaware on 20 September. United States put to sea again on 17 October with orders to cruise along the New England coast and eastward. However, a severe gale arose the following day and United States was disabled with a sprung bowsprit and slackened rigging. Emergency repairs had to be made. After the storm passed, she made her way back to Delaware, arriving on 9 November. Barry received orders in December which returned United States to the West Indies, taking command of the American squadron there. This squadron, in addition to United States, would by early 1799 include: Constitution, George Washington, Merrimack, Portsmouth, Herald and the revenue cutters Pickering, Eagle, Scammel, and Diligence.

On 13 January 1799 French batteries at Deshaies, Guadeloupe fired 9 rounds at her, but all missed. On 3 February 1799, United States sighted a French ship and began a five-hour pursuit of the schooner L'Amour de la Patrie. After coming in close to the vessel, United States opened fire; the third shot went completely through L'Amour de la Patrie, sinking her rapidly. Barry sent out his boats to collect survivors of the schooner, and they were taken prisoner. United States then set a course for Guadeloupe to arrange a prisoner exchange with the French, but Barry's flag of truce was ignored when shore batteries opened fire on the boat carrying Barry's envoy. Barry returned to United States and ordered his gun crews to bombard the batteries in return. On 26 February, United States pursued the French privateer Democrat, which had recently capture the British merchantmen Cicero. United States recaptured Cicero but the pursuit of Democrat ended when she escaped into shallow water. United States also recaptured Maria, another one of Democrat's prizes, and sent both Cicero and Maria into Martinique.

Returning to Guadeloupe, Barry made another attempt at a prisoner exchange. However, Governor Edme Étienne Borne Desfourneaux told Barry he held no prisoners because there was no war with the United States. Though skeptical, Barry released his prisoners.

On 26 March, United States took the French privateer La Tartueffe and its prize, the American ship Vermont southeast of Antigua. Also recorded is the capture of Le Bonaparte sometime in 1799. (Note: Details of United States' captures during this period are sketchy. DANFS is the only source to mention Vermont; Allen puts the capture of La Tartueffe before the prisoner exchange; Hill is the only source to mention Le Bonaparte but makes no mention of the day it occurred.) In April, Barry turned over command of the squadron to Thomas Truxtun. United States sailed for home and arrived at New Castle, Delaware, on 9 May. Barry recruited new crew members to replace the ones whose enlistments had expired while United States underwent refitting and repairs. She sailed again 1 July with orders to patrol the southern Atlantic coast of the United States. Encountering a storm on the 6th which sprung her bowsprit, she continued on to deliver an artillery company to Fort Moultrie and then put into the Gosport Navy Yard for repairs on the 22nd. Returning to patrols on 13 August, United States experienced an uneventful period and at times sailed in company with George Washington and Insurgent.

United States returned to Newport, Rhode Island, in September and Barry waited for further orders. In October those orders were to deliver Oliver Ellsworth and William Davie as envoys to France to negotiate a settlement of the Quasi War. United States departed on 3 November arriving at Lisbon, Portugal on 27 November, departing for Lorient on 21 December but had to put in to A Coruña on 11 January 1800 due to bad weather, and returned in early April 1800. She remained in port for needed repairs until December when Barry was ordered to return to the West Indies. The treaty of peace with France was ratified on 3 February 1801 and United States returned home in April. An act of Congress, passed on 3 March 1801 and signed by President John Adams, retained thirteen frigates. Seven of those frigates, including United States, were to be placed in a reserve fleet. Ordered to the Washington Navy Yard, United States was decommissioned there along with Congress and New York. In a letter dated 12 November 1802 Midshipman Ralph Izard was ordered to take command with the rank of Sailing Master.

== War of 1812 ==
United States remained in the Washington Navy Yard throughout the First Barbary War of 1801–1805 and up until 1809, when orders were given to ready her for active service. On 10 June 1810, now under the command of Stephen Decatur, she sailed to Norfolk, Virginia, for refitting.

While she was at Norfolk, Captain John Carden of the Royal Navy, commander of the new British frigate HMS Macedonian, wagered Decatur a beaver hat that his vessel would take United States if the two should ever meet in battle. Ichabod Crane, whose name was appropriated for the main character in The Legend of Sleepy Hollow, served under Decatur as a lieutenant in the marine detachment aboard ship.

The United States declared war on Britain on 18 June 1812. Three days later, Decatur and United States sailed from New York City within a squadron under the command of Commodore John Rodgers in President. Other ships of the squadron were Congress, Hornet, and Argus; departed on a seventy-day North Atlantic cruise. A passing American merchant ship informed Rodgers that a convoy of British merchantmen was en route to Britain from Jamaica. Rodgers and his squadron sailed in pursuit, and on 23 June encountered HMS Belvidera.

United States and the squadron returned to pursuing the Jamaica-bound convoy and on 1 July began to follow the trail of coconut shells and orange peels the convoy's crews had left behind them. United States sailed to within one day's journey of the English Channel but never sighted the convoy. Rodgers called off the pursuit on 13 July. During their return trip to Boston, the squadron captured seven British merchant ships and recaptured one American vessel.

After some refitting, United States, still under Decatur's command, sailed again 8 October with Rodgers but on the 12th parted from the squadron for her own patrol. Three days later, after capturing Mandarin, United States parted company and continued to cruise eastward. At dawn, on the 25th, five hundred miles south of the Azores, lookouts on board United States reported seeing a sail 12 miles (19 km) to windward. As the ship rose over the horizon, Captain Decatur made out the familiar lines of Macedonian.

=== United States vs Macedonian ===
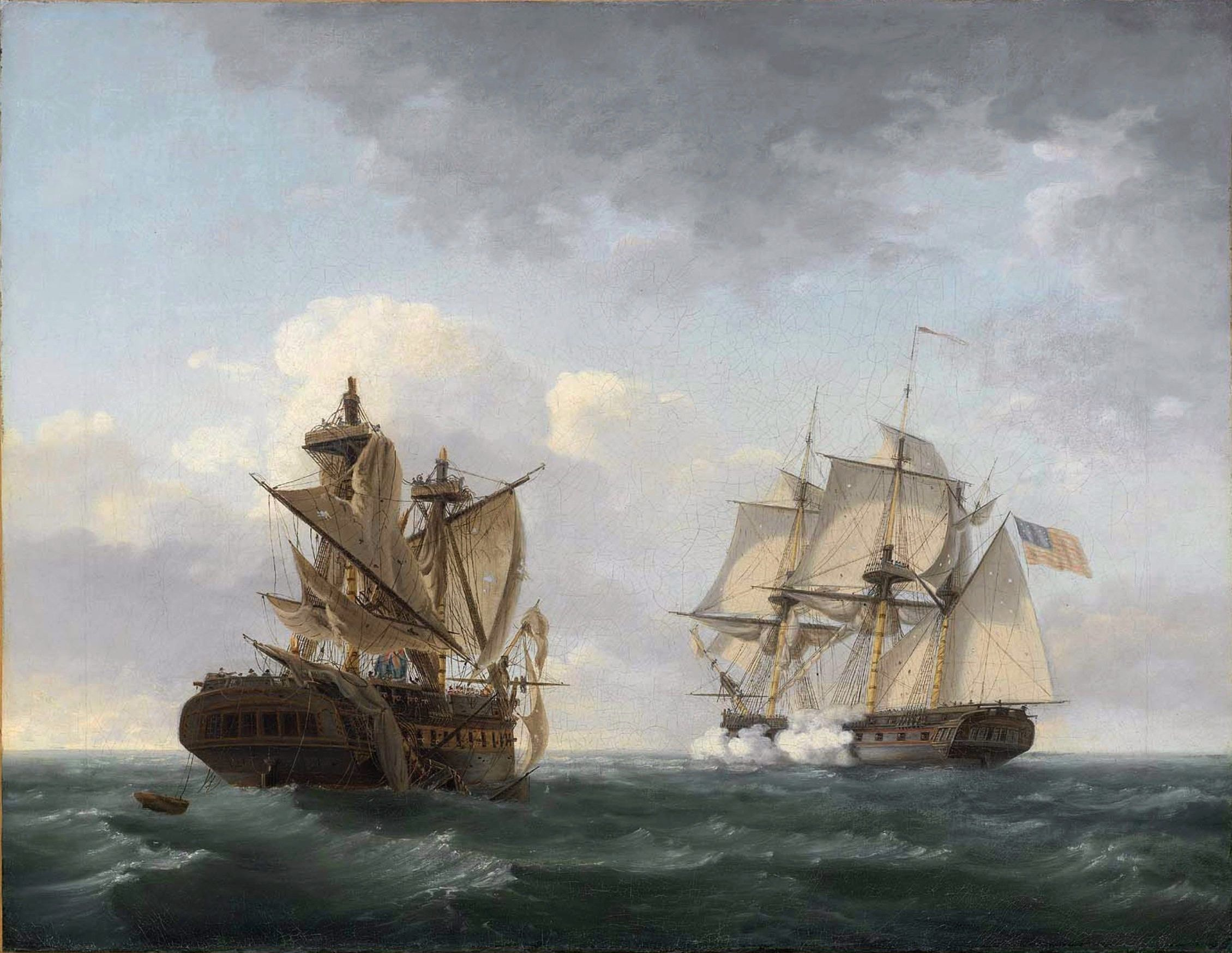
Engagement between United States and Macedonian on 30 October 1812, by Thomas Birch, 1813

Both ships were immediately cleared for action and commenced maneuvers at 0900. Carden elected not to risk crossing the bows of United States to rake her, but chose instead to haul closer to the wind on a parallel course with the American vessel. For his part, Decatur intended to engage Macedonian from fairly long range, where his 24-pounders (11 kg) would have the advantage over the 18-pounders (8 kg) of Macedonian.

The actual battle developed according to Decatur's plan. United States began the action at 0920 by firing an inaccurate broadside at Macedonian. This was answered immediately by Macedonian, bringing down a small spar of United States. Decatur's next broadside destroyed Macedonian's mizzen top mast, letting her driver gaff fall and so giving the advantage in maneuver to the American frigate. United States next took up position off Macedonian's quarter and proceeded to riddle her with shot. By noon, Macedonian was a dismasted hulk and was forced to surrender. She had suffered 104 casualties against 12 in United States, which emerged from the battle relatively unscathed.

The two ships lay alongside each other for over two weeks while Macedonian was repaired sufficiently to sail. United States and her prize entered New York Harbor on 4 December amid jubilation over the victory. Decatur and his crew were received with praise from both Congress and President James Madison.

=== Aftermath ===
Macedonian was subsequently purchased by the United States Navy, repaired, and placed in service. After repairs, United States—accompanied by USS Macedonian and the sloop Hornet—sailed from New York on 24 May 1813. A noteworthy event of this mission is documentation of two women among the crew of United States. Two sailors onboard United States, were encouraged by Decatur to bring their wives on the voyage as nurses to care for the wounded. They are believed to be the first women to serve aboard a United States warship. On 1 June, the three vessels fled into New London, Connecticut after being sighted by a British squadron, which blockaded United States and Macedonian there until the end of the war. Both ships were disarmed and their crews and weapons despatched to American squadrons on the Great Lakes. Hornet slipped past the blockade on 14 November 1814 and put to sea. Decatur was transferred to the frigate President in the spring of 1814, and he took some of the officers and crew of United States with him to his new command.

== Second Barbary War ==
Soon after the outbreak of the War of 1812, Algiers took advantage of the United States' preoccupation with Britain and began attacking American merchant ships in the Mediterranean. On 2 March 1815, at the request of President James Madison, Congress declared war on Algiers. Work preparing two American squadrons promptly began—one at Boston under Commodore William Bainbridge, and one at New York under Commodore Steven Decatur. United States was assigned under Bainbridge but required repairs and refitting from her period in port for the latter part of the War of 1812. She was not ready for sea when Bainbridge departed Boston on 3 July.

United States finally departed for the Mediterranean two months later under the command of Captain John Shaw; arriving at Gibraltar on 25 September. Soon after, Shaw learned that Commodore Decatur had already secured a peace treaty with Algiers. Now part of a large gathering of U.S. Navy ships, United States was chosen to remain behind with Constellation, Erie, and Ontario. They were later joined by John Adams, Alert and Hornet.

The senior American naval officer in the region, Captain Shaw became commodore and commanded the squadron consisting of Constellation, Java, Erie and Ontario until Commodore Isaac Chauncey arrived 1 July 1816 and took overall command. Nevertheless, United States, despite losing her position as flagship, continued to serve in the Mediterranean until she sailed for home in the spring of 1819 and reached Hampton Roads on 18 May. The frigate was decommissioned on 9 June 1819 and laid up at Norfolk.

== Squadron duty ==
United States returned to duty in November 1823 under the command of Commodore Isaac Hull. After repairs and preparation she sailed on 5 January 1824, to relieve Commodore Charles Stewart in the Pacific. Accompanying Hull was his wife and sister-in-law Jeanette Hart.

United States made a stop en route to the Pacific at Rio de Janeiro and reached Valparaiso, Chile by 7 March. Commodore Hull found that Chile was now independent and had been acknowledged by Spain, though hostilities still continued with Peru; Callao was held by the Spaniards and blockaded by the Peruvian fleet. The United States' position was one of strict neutrality in the war and Hull's orders contained the main objective of overseeing and protecting American commerce. United States sailed for Callao, arriving on 4 April. Commodore Stewart, in command of Franklin was relieved by Hull and sailed for home. Under Hull's command, a squadron of US Navy ships consisted of Vincennes, Peacock, and Dolphin.

United States remained in the vicinity of Peru and her duty there was mostly uneventful. In the autumn of 1825, Hull placed Lieutenant John Percival in command of Dolphin and tasked him with searching for mutineers from the American whaling ship Globe. Percival found only two of the mutineers but discovered an uncharted island that he named "Hull's Island"; now known as Îles Maria. Percival continued on to Hawaii and reportedly caused discontent with the tribal chiefs and missionaries. Hull placed Thomas ap Catesby Jones in command of Peacock and dispatched him to Hawaii to ascertain the behavior of Percival. However, upon Jones' arrival, Percival had already departed. With Hull's tour of duty now expired, United States departed from Callao on 16 December 1826 and arrived at the New York Navy Yard on 24 April 1827.

She put into the Philadelphia Navy Yard in 1828 for extensive repairs and remained there until 1830 when she was placed in reserve at the New York Navy Yard. The frigate remained at New York through 1832 and was thoroughly modernized. On 3 July 1832, she sailed under Capt. J. B. Nicholson to join Commodore Patterson's squadron in the Mediterranean, returning to New York 11 December 1834. From 1836 to 1838, under Capt. J. Wilkinson, United States was again in the Mediterranean, and from 1839 to 1840 she was in the Home Squadron under Captain Lawrence Kearney.

=== Capture of Monterey ===
United States was repaired at Norfolk in 1841 and was designated the new flagship of the Pacific Squadron, which was under the command of Jones, now a commodore. On 9 January 1842 she sailed from Norfolk via Cape Horn under Captain James Armstrong. On the night of 6 September 1842, while lying in Callao, the British ship of the line HMS Dublin, the flagship of Rear-admiral Richard Darton Thomas, appeared off the port. Upon sighting the American fleet, Dublin put to sea. This was viewed by Jones with suspicion, which intensified after he was informed that war was supposedly about to break out between Mexico and the US. Suspecting Dublin intended to claim California for Britain following the declaration of war, Jones ordered the United States to sail for the region along with Cyane. Violating Mexican neutrality, the Americans captured Monterey on 16 October, with the Mexican garrison, consisting of only 58 men in an old fort, refusing to resist the invaders. On the next day, Jones discovered that war was not going to break out between the US and Mexico and Britain had no intention of claiming California. The Mexican garrison was freed and the American ships departed.

While waiting for further orders, Jones was informed that the British Captain Lord George Paulet had unofficially occupied Hawaii. Jones sailed there, arriving on 22 July; Thomas arrived a few days later, and overruled Paulet, restoring the Kingdom of Hawaii's independence.

=== Herman Melville ===
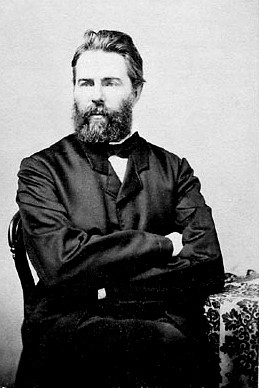
Melville c. 1860

Herman Melville, the future author of Moby-Dick, enlisted as an ordinary seaman on board United States at Honolulu, Hawaii, on 18 August 1843. In White-Jacket, the graphic portrayal of flogging is based on his own direct observation which began his first morning (18 August 1843) aboard. The official log entry simply states, "Commenced with moderate breezes from the Nd & Ed. and clear. Shipped Herman Melville. "O.S". and Griffith Williams "O.S". ... at 9 a m . mustered the crew at Quarters, Punished Jno Hall, "O.S" with 12 lashes with cats for striking sentry on Post. Geo Clark "OS" with 12 of cats for smuggling liquor, Bos. C. B. Stanly "App" with 12 lashes with Kittens for fighting and Wm B Ewing "App" with 6. for using provoking language. Suspended the Boatswain from duty for disrespectful – conduct to the Officer of the Deck, – by replying when ordered by same through – Midn [Midshipman] Key, to call all hands stand by their washed clothes “ that he would 'receive no more orders in this Ship", or words to that effect." The next day 19 August 1843 the log states "Punished Geo Davis, Wm Stewart and Antonio Guavella "Bandsmen" with 12 lashes each for drunkenness." Melville fictionalized these brutal events (chapters 33–35) by changing the seamen's names slightly and setting the punishment musters at sea.

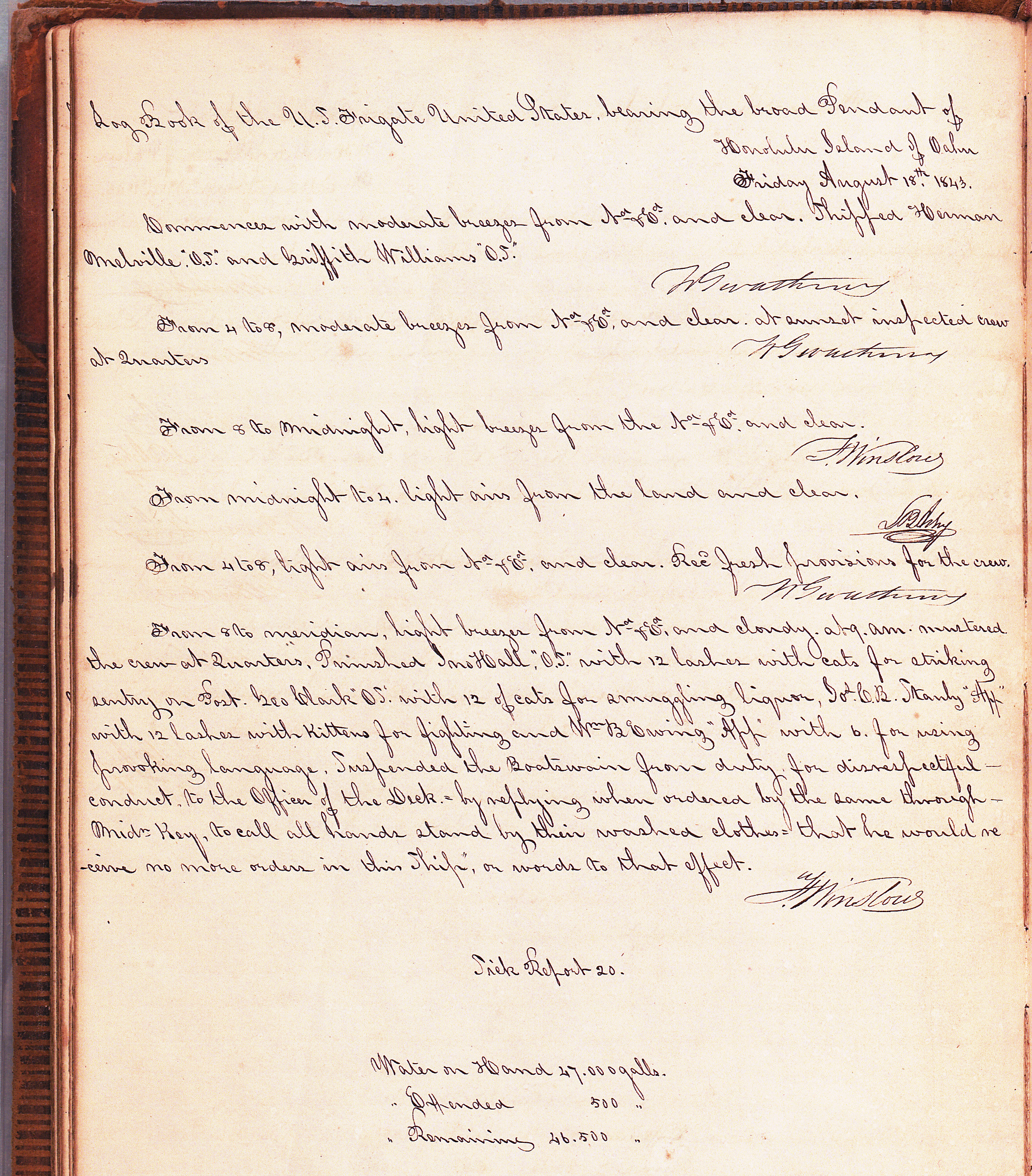
Log of USS United States 18 August 1843 record of entry of author Herman Melville O. S. as crew

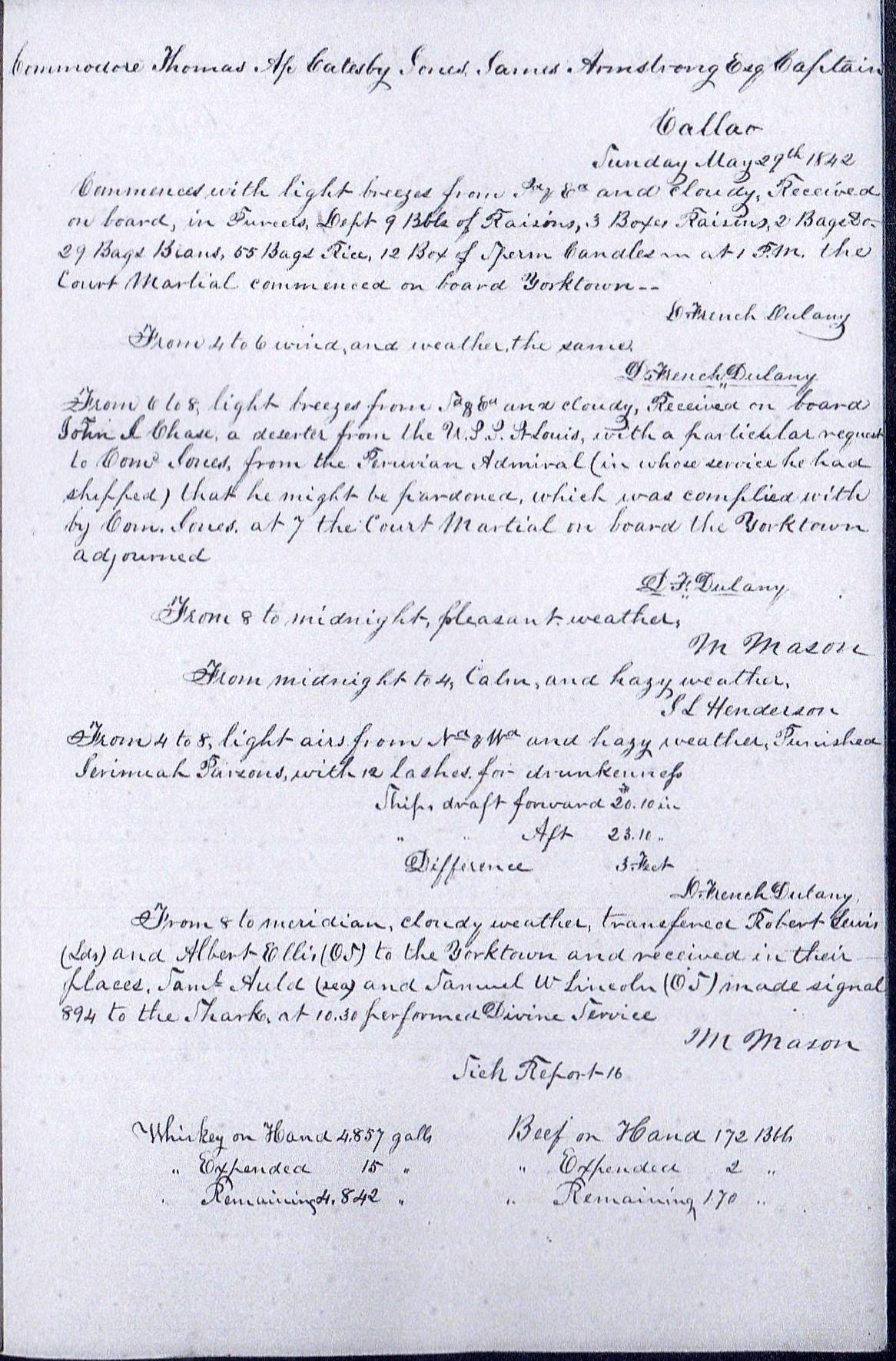
USS United States Log entry for 29 May 1842 re John Jack Chase "captain of the maintop" in White Jacket

His novel White-Jacket, published in 1850, while fictionalized is based on his experiences on board with many actual members of the crew e.g. his hero Jack Chase Captain of the Maintop, Seaman John J.Chase (chapter 4. and thumbnail). Melville though is highly critical of others such as the captain of United States and of naval customs in general. Melville observed that Armstrong often appeared on deck intoxicated. From Hawaii, United States (which Melville refers to as USS Neversink) proceeded to the Marquesas Islands and lost a man overboard en route. From the Marquesas she visited Valparaiso, Chile; Lima and Callao in Peru.

United States remained at Callao for 10 weeks and the crew was denied shore leave while Commodore Jones was in port with his flagship Constellation. Jones inspected every ship under his command during the 10 weeks expecting formal ceremonies at each inspection. The only break in the crew's boredom came when United States challenged Constellation and the British ship HMS Vindictive to a race out of the harbor, handily defeating both vessels.

Setting a course back home in mid-1844, United States arrived at Rio de Janeiro, Brazil for resupply. Departing 24 August for Boston she challenged and won a race with the French sloop Coquette. United States arrived in Boston on 2 October and decommissioned there on the 14th.

She was recommissioned there on 18 May 1846 and detailed to the African Squadron to suppress the illicit slave trade under command of Captain J. Smoot as the flagship of Commodore George C. Read. United States joined the Mediterranean Squadron in 1847 and served in European waters until ordered home late in 1848. She returned to Norfolk on 17 February 1849, was decommissioned on 24 February and placed again in ordinary.

== Civil War ==
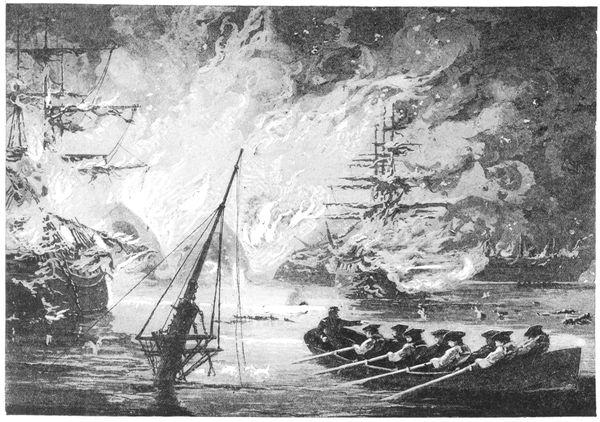
Norfolk Navy Yard burns.

United States deteriorated in Norfolk until 20 April 1861 when the navy yard was captured by Confederate troops. Before leaving the yard, Union fire crews failed to burn the vessel along with other abandoned ships, thinking it unnecessary to destroy an older ship. The Confederates, pressed for vessels in any condition, pumped her out and commissioned the frigate CSS United States (though they often called her Confederate States) on 29 April. On 15 June, she was fitted out as a receiving ship with a deck battery of 19 guns for harbor defense.

Despite good performance, she was ordered sunk in the Elizabeth River, Virginia, to form an obstruction to Union vessels when the Confederates abandoned the navy yard in May 1862. Shortly after the destruction of ironclad ram Virginia on 11 May 1862 and the surrender of the Norfolk Navy Yard to Union troops, United States was raised and towed to the yard by federal authorities. She remained there until March 1864, when the Bureau of Construction and Repair decided to break her up and sell the wood. This was delayed until the Bureau ordered on 18 December that the frigate be docked at Norfolk and finally broken up.

== Bibliography ==
- Allen, Gardner Weld (1905). Our Navy and the Barbary Corsairs. Boston, New York and Chicago: Houghton Mifflin. OCLC 2618279.
- —— (1909). Our Naval War With France. Boston and New York: Houghton Mifflin. OCLC 1202325.
- Beach, Edward L. (1986). The United States Navy 200 Years. New York: H. Holt. ISBN 978-0-03-044711-2. OCLC 12104038.
- Cooper, James Fenimore (1856). History of the Navy of the United States of America. New York: Stringer & Townsend. OCLC 197401914.
- Gapp, Frank W. (1985). "'The Kind-Eyed Chief': Forgotten Champion of Hawaii's Freedom". Hawaiian Journal of History. Vol. 19. Honolulu: Hawaii Historical Society. pp. 101–121. hdl:10524/235. OCLC 451331453.
- Grant, Bruce (1947). Isaac Hull, Captain of Old Ironsides; The Life and Fighting Times of Isaac Hull and the U.S. Frigate Constitution. Chicago: Pellegrini and Cudahy. OCLC 1116348.
- Hill, Frederic Stanhope (1905). Twenty-Six Historic Ships. New York and London: G.P. Putnam's sons. OCLC 1667284.
- Humphreys, Henry H. (1916). "Who Built the First United States Navy?". The Pennsylvania Magazine of History and Biography. XL (4). Philadelphia: Historical Society of Pennsylvania: 385–411. ISSN 0031-4587. OCLC 1762062.
- Maclay, Edgar Stanton; Smith, Roy Campbell (1898) [1893]. A History of the United States Navy, from 1775 to 1898. Vol. 1 (New ed.). New York: D. Appleton. OCLC 609036.
- —— (1898) [1893]. A History of the United States Navy, from 1775 to 1898. Vol. 2 (New ed.). New York: D. Appleton. OCLC 609036.
- Robertson–Lorant, Laurie (1998). Melville : a Biography. Amherst: University of Massachusetts Press. ISBN 1-55849-145-7. OCLC 246192980.
- Roosevelt, Theodore (1883) [1882]. The Naval War of 1812 (3rd ed.). New York: G.P. Putnam's sons. OCLC 133902576.
- Toll, Ian W (2006). Six Frigates: The Epic History of the Founding of the US Navy. New York: W. W. Norton. ISBN 978-0-393-05847-5. OCLC 70291925.
