= Lively-class frigate =

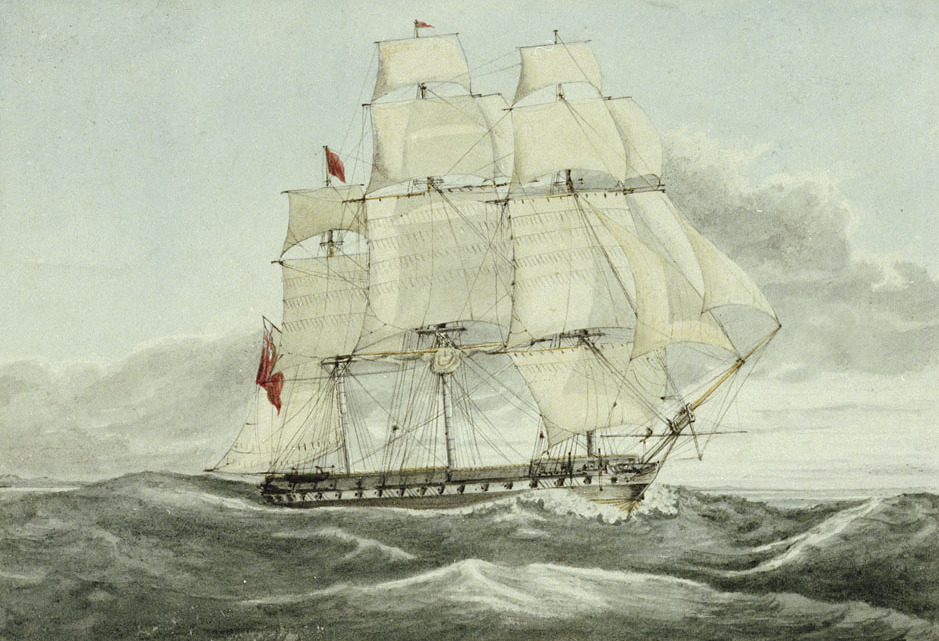
- HMS Hussar

Class overview
- Operators: Royal Navy
- Completed: 16

General characteristics
- Type: Fifth-rate frigate
- Tons burthen: 1,071 51/94 (as designed)
- Length: 154 ft (47 m)
- Beam: 39 ft 5 in (12.01 m)
- Depth: 13 ft 6 in (4.11 m)
- Propulsion: Sail
- Sail plan: Full-rigged ship
- Complement: 284 (later raised to 300, then in 1813 to 320).
- Armament: As ordered : UD: 28 × 18-pounder guns; QD: 2 × 9-pounder guns + 12 × 32-pounder carronades (later ships had 14 of these carronades and no 9-pounders); FC: 2 × 9-pounder guns + 2 × 32-pounder carronades

The Lively class were a class of sixteen 38-gun fifth-rate frigates of the Royal Navy.

== Origins ==
The Lively class were a series of sixteen ships built to a 1799 design by Sir William Rule, which served in the Royal Navy during the Napoleonic Wars. The prototype and name ship of the class was HMS Lively of 1804. In contemporary usage the class was referred to as the 'Repeat Lively class'. As such the prototype ship was not considered to be part of the class at the time.

They were considered the most successful British frigate design of the period, much prized by the Navy Board; after the prototype was launched in 1804 (by which time four more frigates had already been ordered to the same design), a further eleven sister-ships were ordered to her design, although this was slightly modified (in 1805) to have the gangways between forecastle and quarterdeck more integrated into the upperworks, a step towards the final enclosure of the waist. This was reinforced in 1809 by the abandonment of breastworks at the break of the quarterdeck and forecastle and in 1810 by the narrowing of the waist by the addition of gratings inboard of the gangways. At the same date, 'top riders', angled reinforcing timbers for the upperworks, were discontinued.

== Characteristics and performance ==
The captains' reports on the performance of this class were remarkable for their absence of serious criticism. The vessels of the class were fast, recording 13kts large and 10-11kts close-hauled, weatherly and manoeuvrable. They were excellent heavy-weather ships, perfectly able to cope with a "head sea." They stowed their provisions well; they were capable of stowing provisions and fresh water for up to six months of cruising. Indeed, "riding light," after a substantial proportion of fresh water and provisions had been consumed, affected their sailing qualities adversely, so that most captains filled any emptied freshwater stowage capacity with seawater.

== Ships in class ==
- HMS Lively
  - Builder: Woolwich Dockyard
  - Ordered: 15 October 1799
  - Laid down: November 1801
  - Launched: 23 July 1804
  - Completed: 27 August 1804
  - Fate: Wrecked off Malta on 10 August 1810.
- HMS Resistance
  - Builder: Charles Ross, Rochester
  - Ordered: 7 November 1803
  - Laid down: March 1804
  - Launched: 10 August 1805
  - Completed: 19 October 1805 at Chatham Dockyard.
  - Fate: Broken up April 1858 at Chatham Dockyard.
- HMS Apollo
  - Builder: George Parsons, Bursledon.
  - Ordered: 7 November 1803
  - Laid down: April 1804
  - Launched: 27 June 1805
  - Completed: 26 September 1805 at Portsmouth Dockyard.
  - Fate: Broken up October 1856 at Portsmouth Dockyard.
- HMS Hussar
  - Builder: Balthasar & Edward Adams, Bucklers Hard.
  - Ordered: 7 November 1803
  - Laid down: March 1806
  - Launched: 23 April 1807
  - Completed: 27 June 1807 at Portsmouth Dockyard.
  - Fate: Burnt by accident 1861 at Shoeburyness.
- HMS Undaunted
  - Builder: Woolwich Dockyard
  - Ordered: 7 November 1803 from Joseph Graham at Harwich; this builder became bankrupt in 1806 and the contract was transferred to Woolwich Dockyard on 6 January 1806.
  - Laid down: April 1806
  - Launched: 17 October 1807
  - Completed: 2 December 1807
  - Fate: Broken up at Portsmouth in December 1860.
- HMS Statira
  - Builder: Robert Guillaume, Northam, Southampton.
  - Ordered: 4 June 1805
  - Laid down: December 1805
  - Launched: 7 July 1807
  - Completed: 26 August 1807 at Portsmouth Dockyard.
  - Fate: Wrecked off Cuba on 26 February 1815.
- HMS Horatio
  - Builder: George Parsons, Bursledon.
  - Ordered: 15 June 1805
  - Laid down: July 1805
  - Launched: 23 April 1807
  - Completed: 4 August 1807 at Portsmouth Dockyard.
  - Fate: Sold to break up 1861 at Charlton.
- HMS Spartan
  - Builder: Charles Ross, Rochester
  - Ordered: 24 August 1805
  - Laid down: October 1805
  - Launched: 16 August 1806
  - Completed: 6 October 1806 at Chatham Dockyard.
  - Fate: Broken up April 1822 at Plymouth Dockyard.
- HMS Menelaus
  - Builder: Plymouth Dockyard
  - Ordered: 28 September 1808
  - Laid down: November 1808
  - Launched: 17 April 1810
  - Completed: 21 June 1810 at Plymouth Dockyard.
  - Fate: Sold 10 May 1897 to be broken up.
- HMS Nisus
  - Builder: Plymouth Dockyard
  - Ordered: 28 September 1808
  - Laid down: December 1808
  - Launched: 3 April 1810
  - Completed: 15 June 1810 at Plymouth Dockyard.
  - Fate: Broken up at Plymouth September 1822.
- HMS Macedonian
  - Builder: Woolwich Dockyard
  - Ordered: 28 September 1808
  - Laid down: May 1809
  - Launched: 2 June 1810
  - Completed: 6 July 1810 at Chatham Dockyard
  - Fate: Captured by United States 25 October 1812. Served as USS Macedonian. Broken up 1834.
- HMS Crescent
  - Builder: Woolwich Dockyard
  - Ordered: 28 September 1808
  - Laid down: September 1809
  - Launched: 11 December 1810
  - Completed: 2 February 1811
  - Fate: Sold to be broken up 1854.
- HMS Bacchante
  - Builder: Deptford Dockyard
  - Ordered: 12 June 1809
  - Laid down: July 1810
  - Launched: 16 March 1811
  - Completed: 25 January 1812
  - Fate: Broken up 1858.
- HMS Nymphe
  - Builder: George Parsons, Warsash.
  - Ordered: 14 December 1810
  - Laid down: January 1811 as HMS Nereide (renamed later that year)
  - Launched: 13 April 1812
  - Completed: 22 June 1812 at Portsmouth Dockyard
  - Fate: Broken up 1875.
- HMS Sirius
  - Builder: Richard Blake & John Tyson, Bursledon.
  - Ordered: 14 December 1810
  - Laid down: September 1811
  - Launched: 11 September 1813
  - Completed: 29 September 1815 at Portsmouth Dockyard
  - Fate: Broken up 1862.
- HMS Laurel
  - Builder: John Parsons & John Rubie, Warsash.
  - Ordered: 21 March 1812
  - Laid down: July 1812
  - Launched: 31 May 1813
  - Completed: 13 September 1813 at Portsmouth Dockyard
  - Fate: Sold to be broken up 1885.

== Bibliography ==
- Robert Gardiner, The Heavy Frigate, Conway Maritime Press, London 1994.
- Gardiner, Robert (2000) Frigates of the Napoleonic Wars, Chatham Publishing, London.
- Rif Winfield, British Warships in the Age of Sail, 1714–1792, Seaforth Publishing, Barnsley 2007. ISBN 978-1-84415-700-6.
- Rif Winfield, British Warships in the Age of Sail, 1793–1817, 2nd edition, Seaforth Publishing, Barnsley 2008. ISBN 978-1-84415-717-4.
