= USRC Scammel =

Two vessels of the United States Revenue Cutter Service have been named USRC Scammel:

- USRC Scammel (1791), was a revenue cutter in service from 1791 to 1798
- USRC Scammel (1798), was a 14-gun schooner commissioned in 1798, and transferred to the U.S. Navy as USS Scammel, decommissioned and sold in 1801
