= Engagement between the United States and the Macedonian =

1813 painting by Thomas Birch

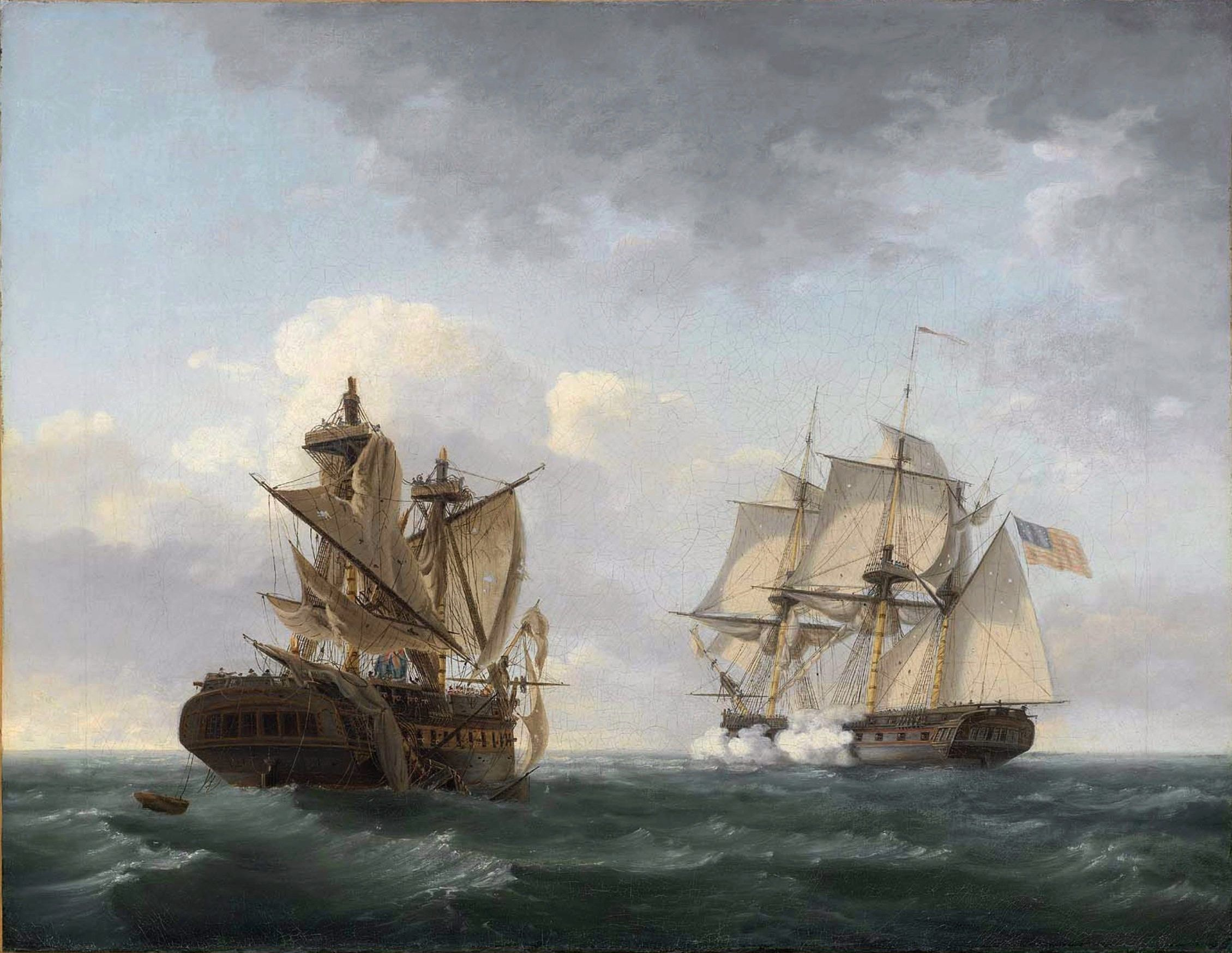
Engagement between the "United States" and the "Macedonian", on October 25, 1812, by Thomas Birch, 1813, Museum of Fine Arts, Boston, 70.48 cm × 91.1 cm (27.75 in × 35.87 in)

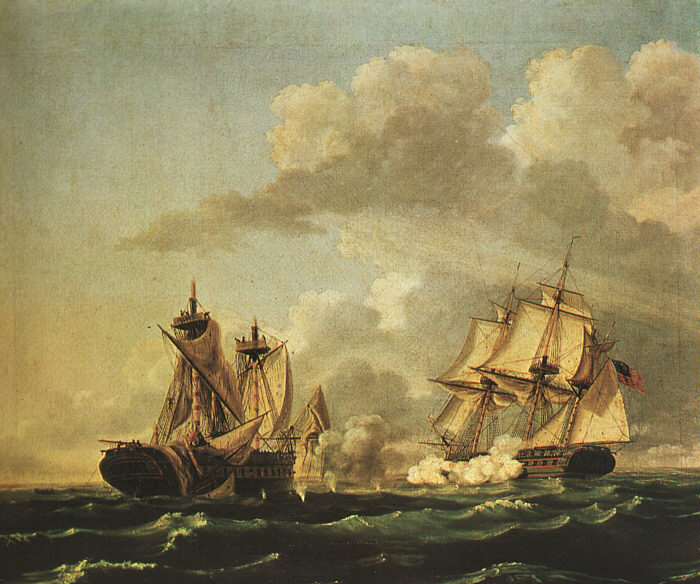
Engagement between the "United States" and the "Macedonian", on October 25, 1812, by Thomas Birch, 1813, Historical Society of Pennsylvania, 28 in × 34.5 in (71 cm × 88 cm)

Engagement between the United States and the Macedonian is an 1813 oil painting by American painter Thomas Birch depicting the naval engagement fought near Madeira on October 25, 1812 between the US Navy heavy frigate USS United States and the Royal Navy frigate HMS Macedonian. The battle resulted in the capture of Macedonian.

Birch painted the subject at least three times. An original painting was displayed in the Oval Office at the White House from 1961 to 1963 during the presidency of John F. Kennedy. Kennedy made plans to redecorate the Oval Office after his inauguration in 1961, and he wanted a painting of a naval battle to hang over the fireplace. A report in The Philadelphia Inquirer led J. Welles Henderson (the lawyer, and son of Joseph Welles Henderson) to lend a painting of the engagement between the United States and the Macedonian and a second naval painting by Birch, which were part of his personal collection displayed at Philadelphia Maritime Museum. The other painting depicted the earlier battle of USS Constitution against HMS Guerriere. HMS Guerriere was captured in August 1812, but was too damaged and could not be brought back to port, so was set on fire and abandoned.

The work measures 62.9 cm × 81.9 cm (24.8 in × 32.2 in). After being displayed at the White House, it was held at museums in Philadelphia. It was sold by the estate of J. Welles Henderson at auction at Sotheby's in May 2008 for $481,000.

A slightly different and slightly larger version, which measures 70.48 cm × 91.1 cm (27.75 in × 35.87 in), also attributed to Birch 1813, has been held by the Museum of Fine Arts, Boston, since 1978. A third version, which measures 28 in × 34.5 in (71 cm × 88 cm), also Birch 1813, is held by the Historical Society of Pennsylvania.

A version by or after Birch is at the Home of Franklin D. Roosevelt National Historic Site, in Hyde Park, New York; and a version 25 in × 30 in (64 cm × 76 cm) "After Thomas Birch" was sold at Christie's in 2017 for $11,250.

An engraving of the painting by Benjamin Tanner was published on 25 October 1813. Another engraving was made by Samuel Seymour, 1815, and published by James Webster.

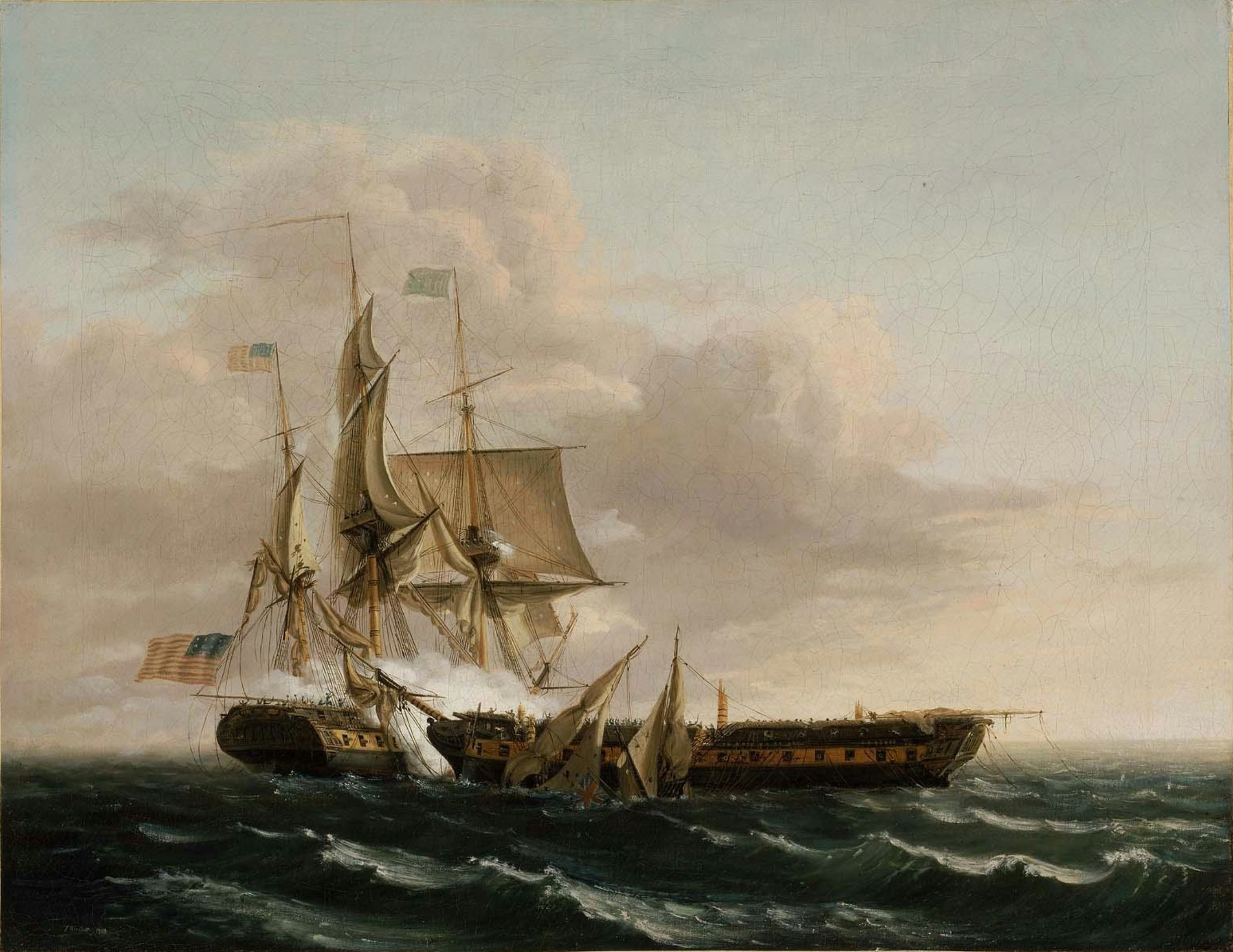
Thomas Birch, Engagement Between the "Constitution" and the "Guerrière", 1813, Museum of Fine Arts, Boston
