= John Carden (loyalist) =

Loyalist militia officer in the American South during the American Revolution

Major John Carden
- Born: 1740; Ireland
- Died: 31 October 1782 (aged 41–42) South Carolina
- Allegiance: British Empire
- Branch: Loyalist Militia
- Service years: 1775–1782
- Rank: Major
- Conflicts: American Revolutionary War; Southern Theater; Battle of Hanging Rock
- Spouses: Sarah Surman; Judith Wragg; Kitty Hazard
- Children: John Surman Carden

Major John Carden was a British military officer who led loyalist militia during the American Revolutionary War, most notably commanding the British force at the Battle of Hanging Rock.

== Life ==
John Carden was born in Ireland sometime around 1740. In 1759 he joined the 17th Regiment of Foot as an ensign. He left the army in 1771 but reenlisted in 1776 or 1777. He was commisoned as a major on April 24, 1777, commanding British forces at the Battle of Hanging Rock in 1780. He married Judith Wragg in Charleston, South Carolina, even though he was still married to Sarah Surman. Some evidence suggests he tried to fake his death. His wife Judith Wragg died in 1781, and he remarried that year to Kitty Hazard. His son later become a British Admiral John Surman Carden, who noted in his memoir that his father died on October 31, 1782.
