= Thomas Birch (artist) =

19th-century American portrait and marine painter

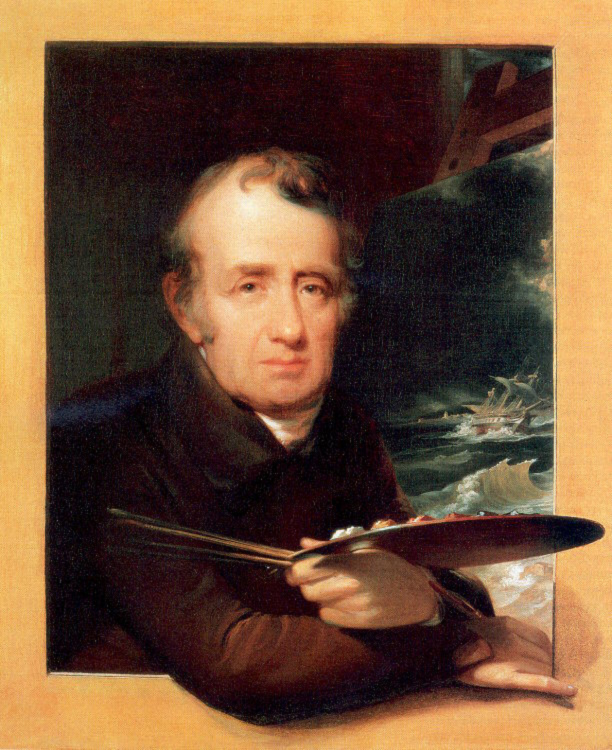
- The Studious Artist: Portrait of Thomas Birch by John Neagle, 1836, Pennsylvania Academy of the Fine Arts
- Born: 1779
- Died: 1851 (aged 71–72)
- Known for: Painting

Thomas Birch (1779 – January 3, 1851) was an English-born American portrait and marine painter.

== Biography ==
Birch was born in Warwickshire, England. He came to the U.S. in 1794, and assisted his artist father, William Birch, in preparing a 29-plate collection of engravings: Birch's Views of Philadelphia (1800). Subscribers to the series included President John Adams and Vice President Thomas Jefferson. This sold well and went into multiple editions, inspiring similar collected views of New York City, and of suburban estates surrounding Philadelphia and Baltimore. The son's first major painting appears to have been a view of Philadelphia from the Treaty Elm in Kensington, which was also engraved and published in 1804. He painted portraits until about 1807, when he took up marine-painting, which characterized the main body of his work as a painter. Some of his most famous works depict naval battles of the War of 1812.

According to curator Stephanie A. Munsing: "Birch was the first American ship portraitist, and his paintings were copied by countless artists and craftsmen in America and Europe." Historian David S. Lovejoy said he was "outstanding among the marine painters" of his time. Contemporary critic William Dunlap similarly felt that there was no better marine painter in the U.S. at the time. In addition to ships, they provide valuable images of bridges, lighthouses, docksides, and harbor fortifications in the Early Republic, especially those surrounding New York City and Philadelphia. His paintings of suburban mansions and rural snow scenes were often turned into engravings.

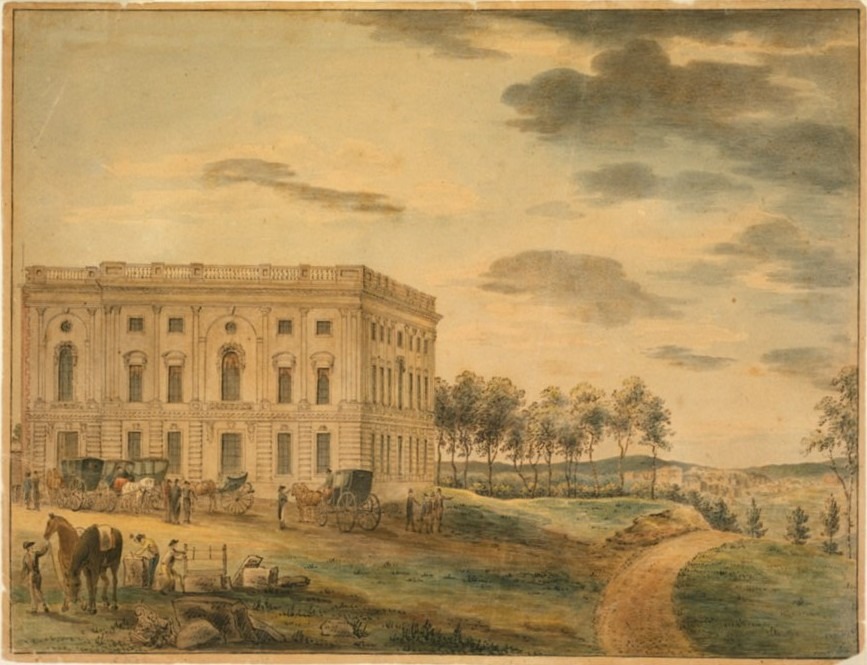
United States Capitol, Completed Northern Wing (c. 1801), engraving, Library of Congress.

Historically, the Birches' most important work may be a circa-1801 engraving documenting the unfinished U.S. Capitol. Another, may be the son's painting depicting an 1812 naval battle between USS United States and HMS Macedonian, that hung in the Oval Office of U.S. President John F. Kennedy. It was sold at auction in 2008, setting a record price for the artist of $481,000.

An assessment from 1867 reads:

Marine landscapes were painted thirty years ago by an Englishman in Philadelphia — Thomas Birch. The freshness of his atmosphere and clearly-painted waves were a marked feature. His delineation of the engagement between the U.S. frigate Constitution and the British frigate Guerriere, and that between the United States and the Macedonian — each four by two feet six inches — are fine specimens of this artist, and of rare historical value.

Birch exhibited regularly at the Pennsylvania Academy of the Fine Arts for forty years, beginning in 1811, and managed the museum, 1812–17. He also exhibited nine paintings at the National Academy of Design. Three of his paintings were engraved and published in The Token and Atlantic Souvenir annual gift book in the 1820s and 30s, including Outward Bound.

Birch's work is collected at PAFA, the Library Company of Philadelphia, the Philadelphia Museum of Art, the Smithsonian American Art Museum, the U.S. Naval Academy, the Museum of Fine Arts, Boston, and the Winterthur Museum, Garden and Library, among others. In 1833, he was elected into the National Academy of Design as an Honorary member. He died in Philadelphia, Pennsylvania.

== Gallery ==
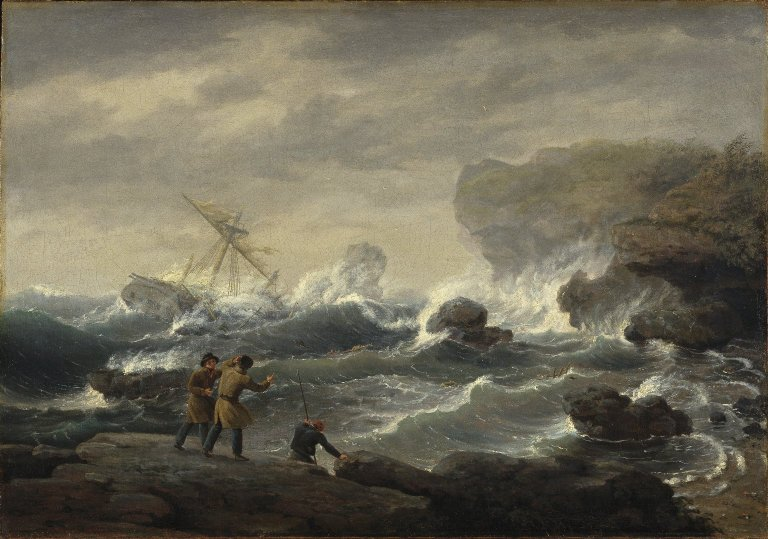
Thomas Birch, Shipwreck, 1829. Oil on canvas. Brooklyn Museum

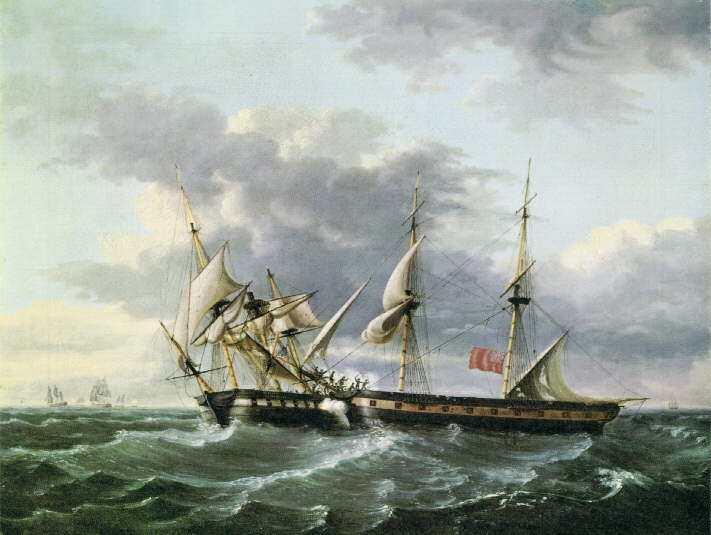
USS Wasp boarding HMS Frolic, 1815, Peabody Essex Museum

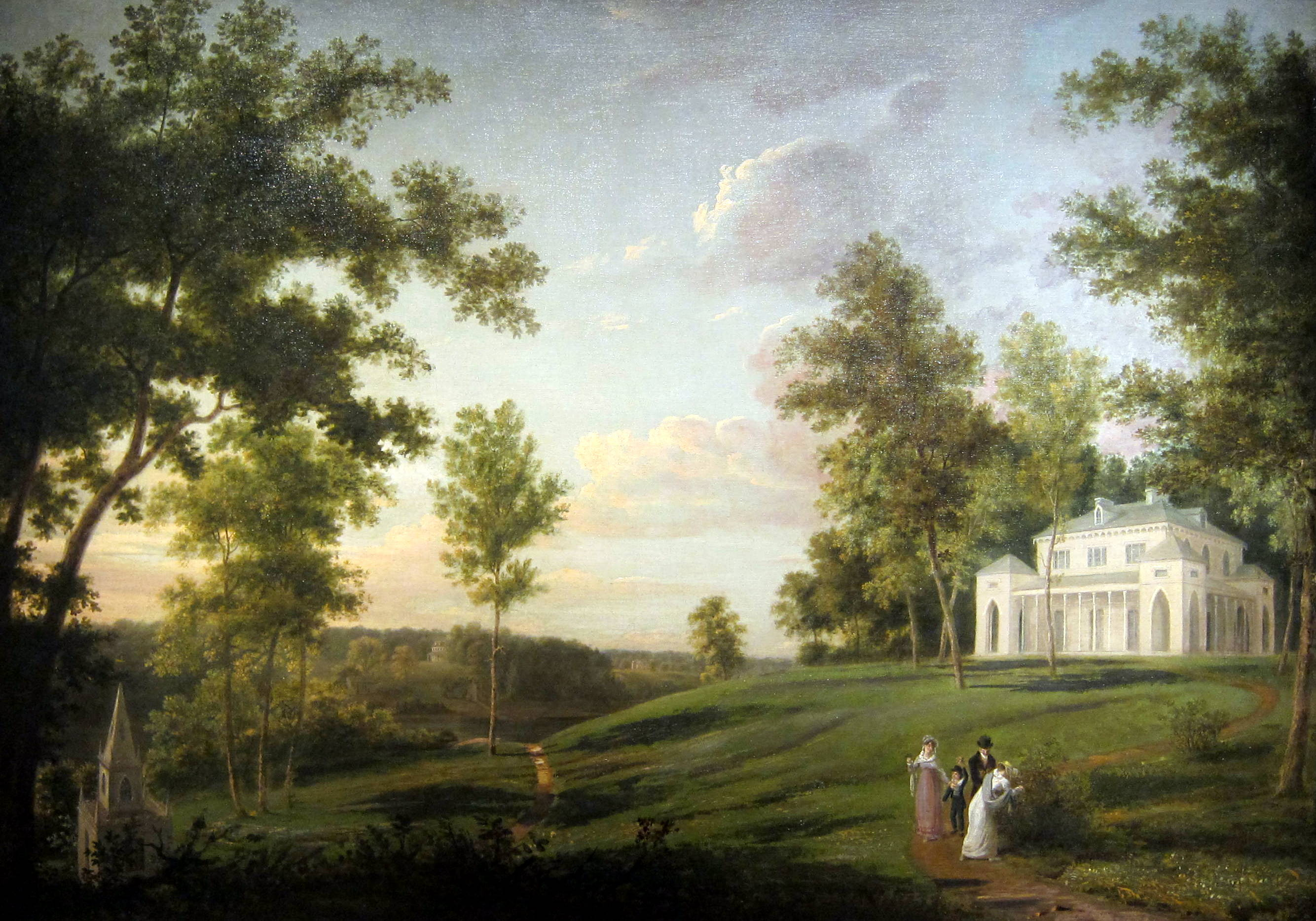
Sedgeley Park, Philadelphia, 1819, Smithsonian American Art Museum, Washington, D.C.

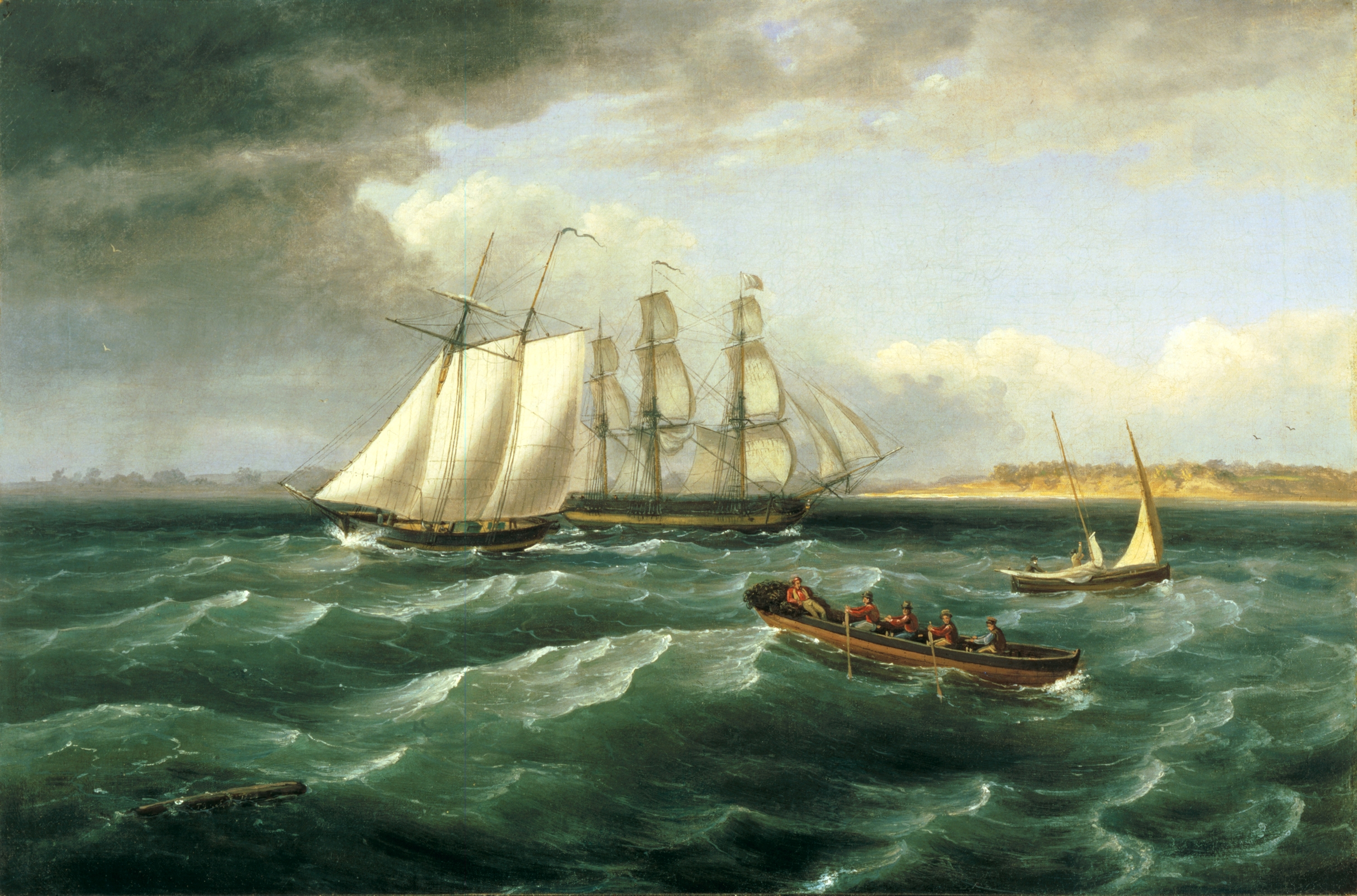
Mouth of the Delaware, 1828, White House Historical Association, Washington, D.C.

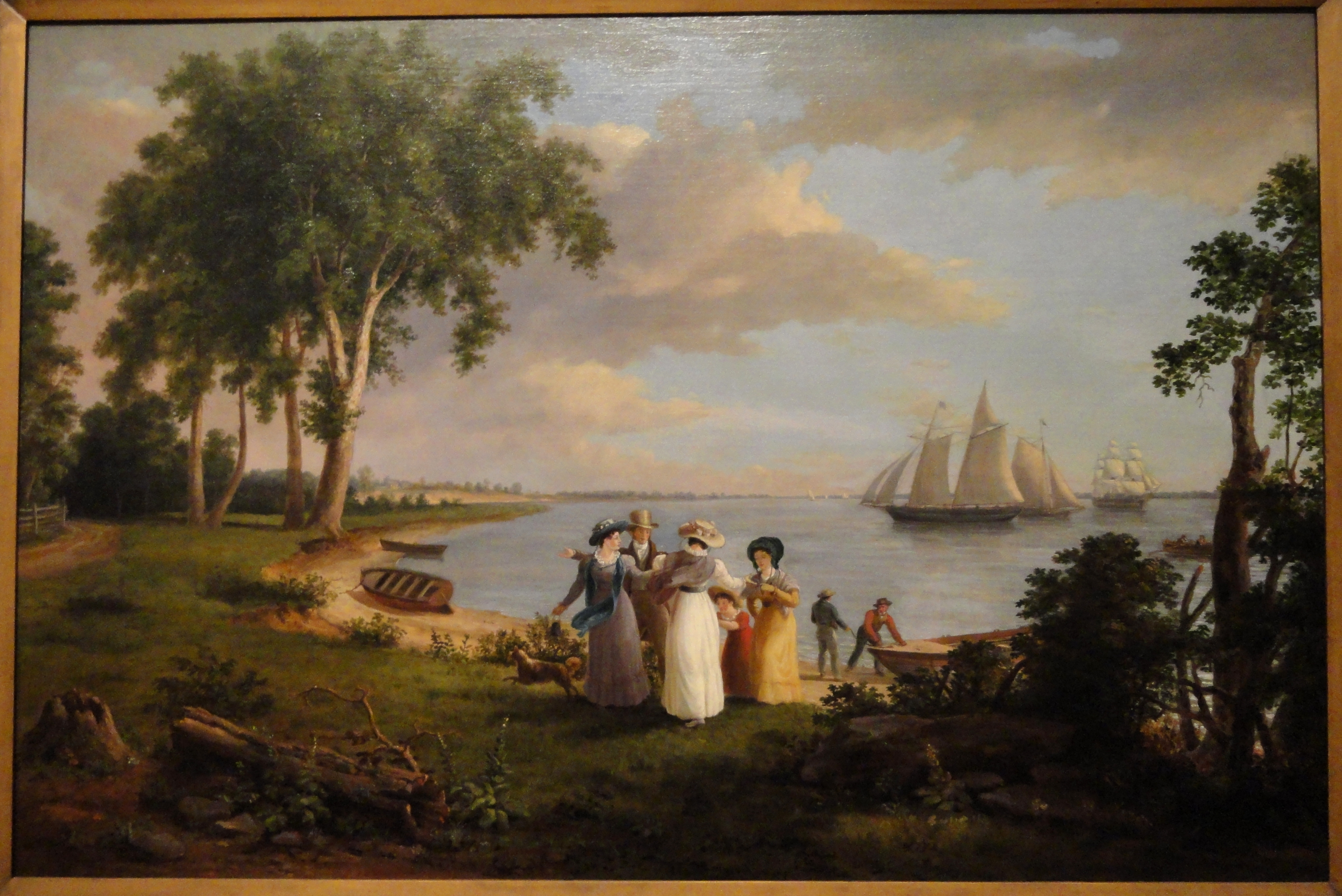
View of the Delaware near Philadelphia, 1831, Corcoran Gallery of Art, Washington, D.C.

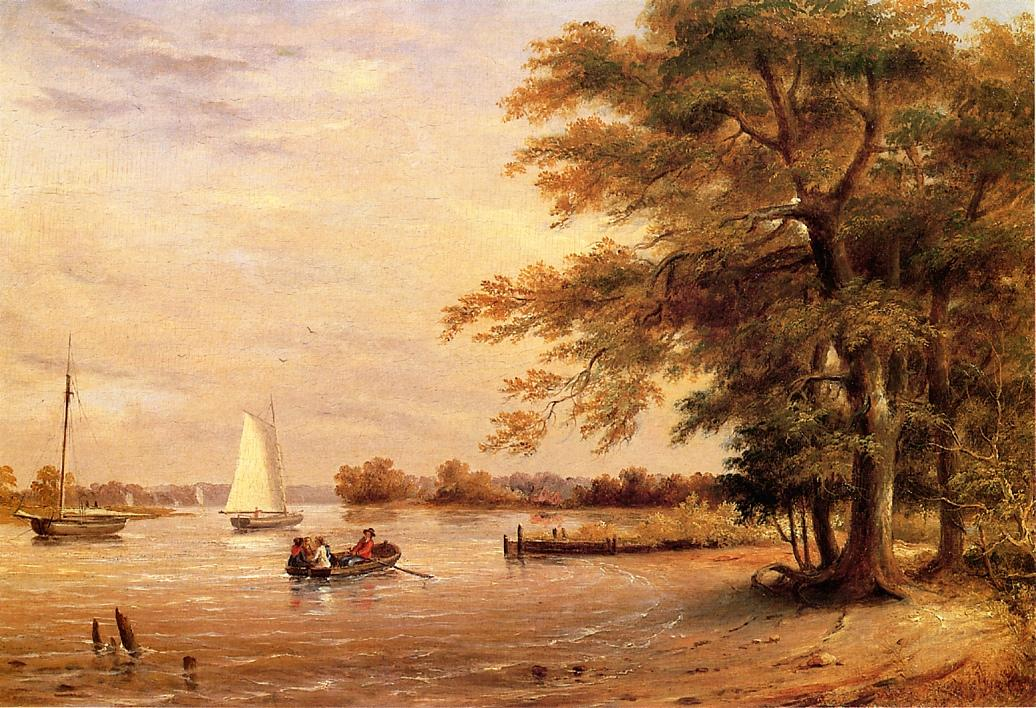
On the Shrewsbury River, Redbank, New Jersey, 1840

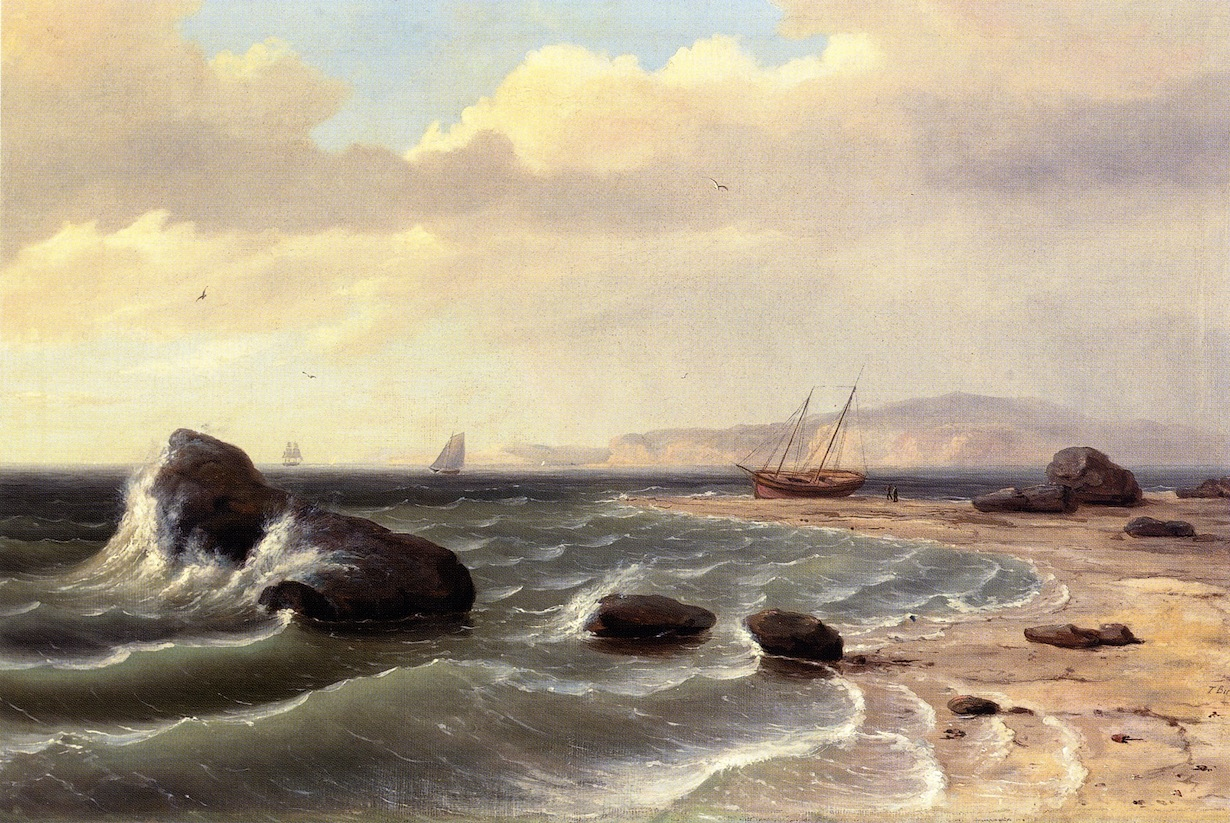
An American Shore Scene, 1831

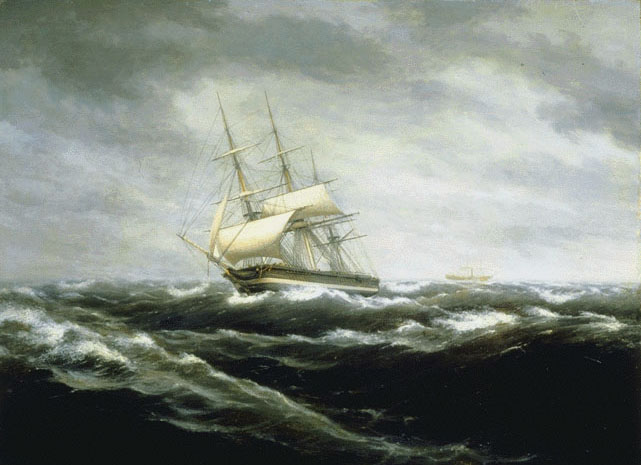
packet ship in a stormy sea, 1849 in the collection at The Mariners' Museum

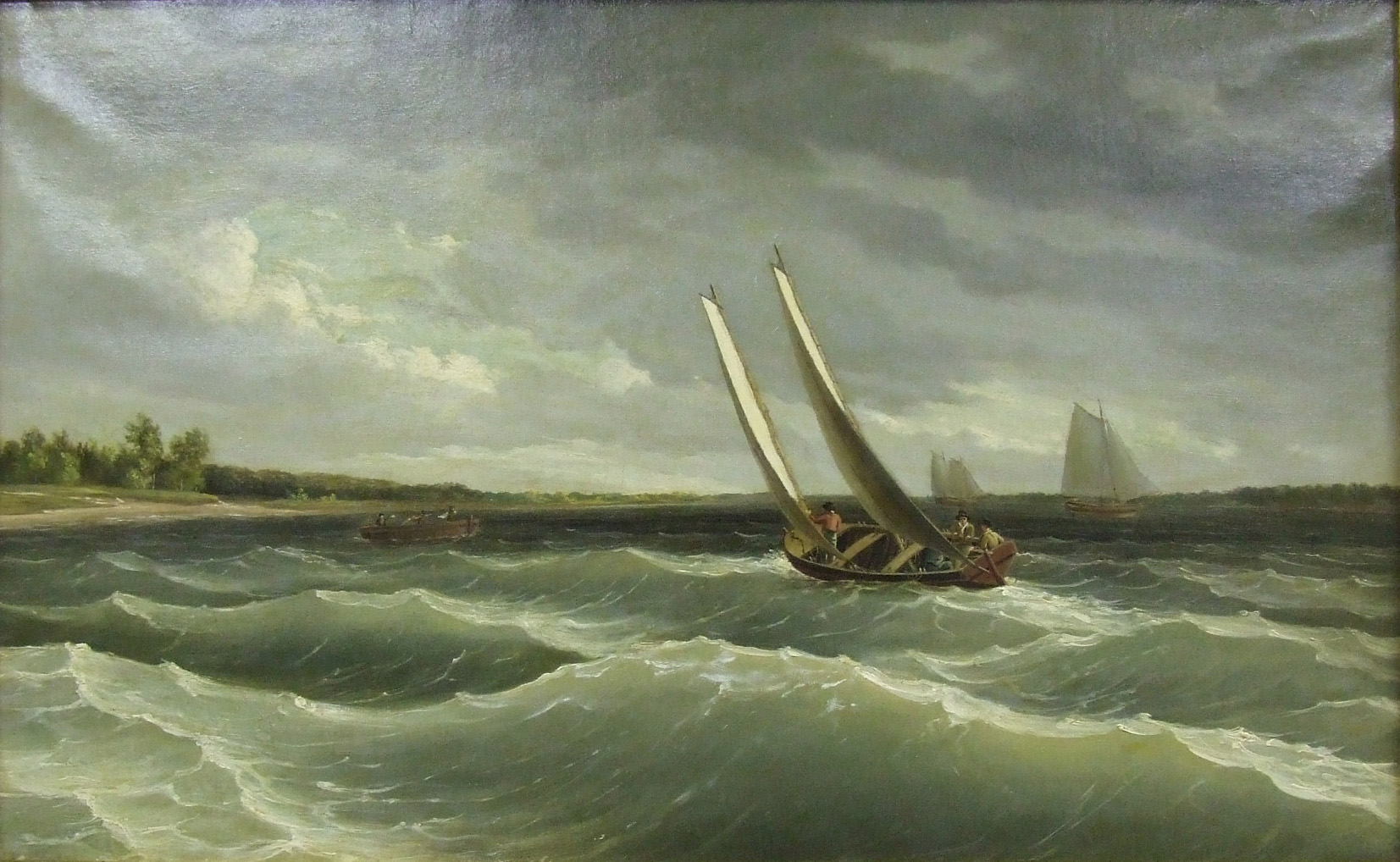
boats navigating the waves, ca 1828 in the collection at The Mariners' Museum

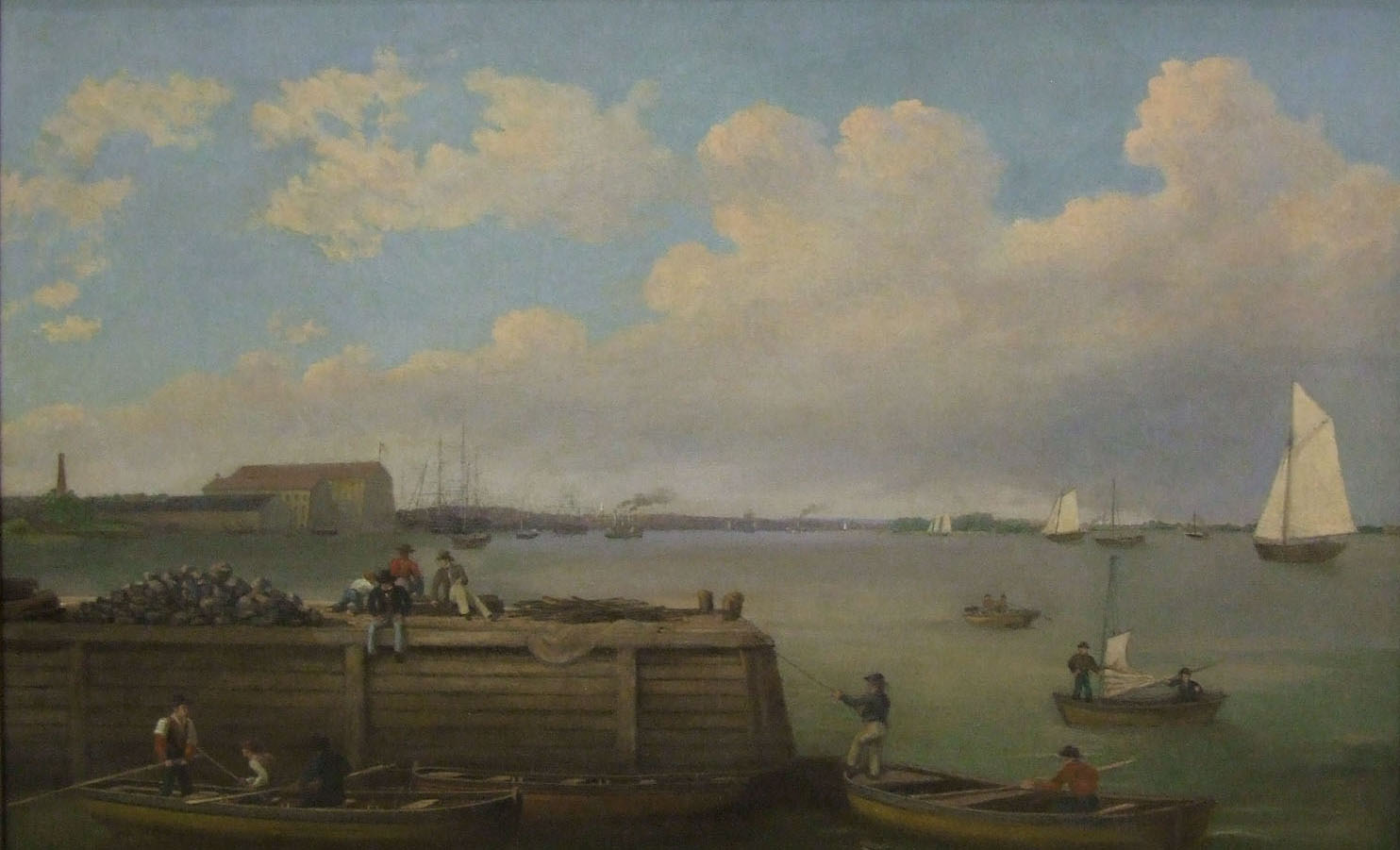
view of the Philadelphia Navy Yard, 1835 in the collection at The Mariners' Museum
