= Fitz Babbitt =

American Navy officer

Fitz Henry Babbitt
- Born: October 10, 1790; Brookfield, Massachusetts, US
- Died: January 15, 1815 (aged 24); At sea during the capture of USS President
- Military career
- Branch: United States Navy
- Service years: 1804–1815
- Rank: Lieutenant
- Units: USS Essex; USS Spitfire; USS Chesapeake; USS Argus; USS Nautilus; USS Adams; USS United States; USS President
- Conflicts: War of 1812 • Chesapeake–Leopard affair • Capture of USS President

Lieutenant Fitz Henry Babbitt (10 October 1790 – 15 January 1815) was an officer of the United States Navy who served during the War of 1812, and was killed during the capture of USS President.

== Biography ==
Babbitt was probably born in Brookfield, Massachusetts, and was appointed a midshipman in the Navy on 2 April 1804. He accepted his warrant on 28 May 1804 and entered into service on board the 32-gun frigate Essex, that same day. He served in Essex and in the bomb ketch Spitfire in the Mediterranean Sea between 1804 and 1806. Returning home to the United States in Spitfire in August 1806, Babbitt joined the frigate Chesapeake in 1807 and had charge of her quarterdeck guns on the occasion of the battle with HMS Leopard on 22 June 1807. He was appointed an acting lieutenant and ordered to the brig Argus on 1 February 1810. He cruised the waters along the east coast of the United States in Argus until late October, at which time he was furloughed. Babbitt received his lieutenant's commission on 4 March 1811, with seniority to date from 5 June 1810.

On 19 February 1812, he received orders to join Nautilus and served in her until 17 July 1812 when a British squadron – built around the 64-gun ship-of-the-line HMS Africa and the frigates Shannon and Aeolus – captured Nautilus off the northern New Jersey coast. Babbitt spent several weeks as a prisoner of war in Halifax, Nova Scotia, before being exchanged. Following his return, he was assigned to the frigate Adams on 30 November 1812 and helped in the futile effort to get that ship ready for sea after her modification into a sloop of war. Though the work was completed by the end of 1812, the British had Adams blockaded in Chesapeake Bay by then, and she remained so until early in 1814. Babbitt's assignment to Adams, however, lasted only until the spring of 1813. On 6 April 1813, he received orders to join the frigate United States; but those orders were apparently changed later in the month, and he went to Sackett's Harbor along with the officers and men of the blockaded Adams. In September 1813, Babbitt again received orders to United States to serve as that ship's first lieutenant. United States, however, languished at New London – along with her recent prize, HMS Macedonian, by then also in American service, and the sloop of war Hornet – under a blockade imposed by a powerful British squadron.

In the spring of 1814, the frigate's commanding officer, Captain Stephen Decatur, received a posting to command the 44-gun frigate President, and took the crew of United States with him to man his new command. Thus, Babbitt came to be President's first lieutenant. Once again, Babbitt found himself assigned to a warship unable to get to sea because of a strong blockade. The frigate remained hemmed in at New York for the rest of 1814. Not until January 1815 did conditions allow President to attempt her escape to sea. Though the peace treaty had been signed in Ghent, Belgium, in December 1814, word had not reached the Americas, and hostilities continued in the western hemisphere for some weeks. Thus, when President made her move for the open sea, British warships stood ready to engage her. In her breakout attempt on 14 January 1815, President ran afoul of another squadron of British ships comprising HMS Endymion, Majestic, Pomone and Tenedos.

During the ensuing fight, President managed to inflict sufficient damage on HMS Endymion to force her out of the struggle, but the unequal contest exacted a greater toll from the American ship. Unable to outrun her other adversaries because of hull damage sustained during a grounding soon after sailing, President finally succumbed to the combined attention of the three remaining British ships after a six-hour exchange in which she lost 24 of her crewmen and three of her lieutenants, including Babbitt.

== Namesake ==
The destroyer USS Babbitt (DD-128) (1919–1946) was named for him.
