= Arthur Bingham =

British naval officer (1784–1830)

Captain Arthur Bingham
- Born: 1784
- Died: 1830 (aged 45–46)
- Military career
- Allegiance: United Kingdom
- Branch: Royal Navy
- Service years: – 1830
- Rank: Post captain
- Commands: HMS Caledon; HMS Little Belt; HMS Myrtle; HMS Dover; HMS Thetis
- Conflicts: Little Belt affair Napoleonic Wars

Arthur Batt Bingham (1784–1830) was an officer in the Royal Navy, rising to the rank of post captain. He is remembered chiefly for his command of HMS Little Belt, when the Little Belt affair occurred, just prior to the War of 1812.

== Family and early life ==
Bingham was born in 1784, the second son of the Ven. William Bingham, D.D. (1743–1819), vicar of Great Gaddesden (1777) and rector of Hemel Hempstead (1778) – later archdeacon of London (1789–1813) and chaplain to George III (1792); and his wife Agnata (aka Agnes), daughter of Liebert Dörrien, a merchant of Fenchurch Street, London and of West Ham, Essex. Arthur entered the Navy, and was promoted to the rank of lieutenant on 1 May 1804. By early 1809 he was first lieutenant aboard HMS Nereide, then on the Cape of Good Hope Station under Captain Robert Corbett.

== Lieutenant of the Nereide ==
Nereide sailed from Simon's Bay on 1 May and cruised off the French possessions of Mauritius and Réunion. In August Corbett began an attack on Sainte-Rose on the eastern side of Réunion, using grapeshot to fire on two batteries overlooking the harbour. The sloop HMS Sapphire, under the command of Acting-Captain Bertie Cornelius Cator, came alongside and fired a broadside, silencing the enemy guns. Bingham then led a party of men from Nereide onto the shore, narrowly avoiding being killed by a piece of shot that killed the marine next to him. He and his men captured the French governor, spiked the six French cannon, burnt their carriages and blew up a store of rockets. He then laid a train of powder to blow up over 100 barrels of gunpowder contained in a bomb-proof magazine, but it exploded sooner than expected. Bingham was blown 'a considerable distance', and suffered some wounds and burns. Corbett made a list of demands from the French for re-provisioning, and then took off the enemy's guns and sank them in deep water. After the successful conclusion of the operation Corbett wrote reports praising Cator and Bingham.

Bingham was again in action off Réunion, when Nereide was part of Josias Rowley's fleet to retake the French islands. Bingham led the action to capture the French frigate Caroline, and later presented her commander's sword to Corbett. His talent noticed, Bingham was given command of HMS Caledon at the end of 1809 and sailed her to England.

== Commander of Little Belt ==
By November 1810 Bingham was given the command of the 20-gun sixth-rate sloop Little Belt, and sailed to Halifax, and later to the Caribbean. On 19 April 1811 he was ordered by Rear-Admiral Herbert Sawyer to deliver instructions to Captain Samuel Pechell of HMS Guerriere, then somewhere off the North American coast. If unable to locate Pechell, Bingham was ordered to cruise off the coast, protecting British trade until his supplies were exhausted, at which point he was to put into Halifax and await further orders. He was warned

You are to be particularly careful, not to give any just cause of offence to the government or the subjects of the United States of America...

Bingham duly sailed from Bermuda, but being unable to locate the Guerriere, commenced cruising off the coast.

=== The Little Belt affair ===
On the morning of 10 May, as Little Belt was some 48 miles east of Cape Charles at the entrance to Chesapeake Bay, a strange sail was sighted in the distance. Bingham made signal 275 (calling on a strange ship, if a British warship, to show her number). The other ship did not reply, and Bingham concluded that the mystery ship was a frigate of the United States Navy. He hoisted his colours and began to round Cape Hatteras. The frigate followed, closing Little Belt, and appeared to be trying to manoeuvre into a position to rake the smaller British ship. Bingham wore ship three times to foil the American's attempts, while calling for the frigate to identify herself. Each time though the American demanded the same of Bingham. The frigate, actually the 44-gun USS President under Commodore John Rodgers, then, according to Bingham, opened fire on the Little Belt. Bingham returned fire and an engagement began, lasting three-quarters of an hour. The President was observed to have a fire onboard and drew away.

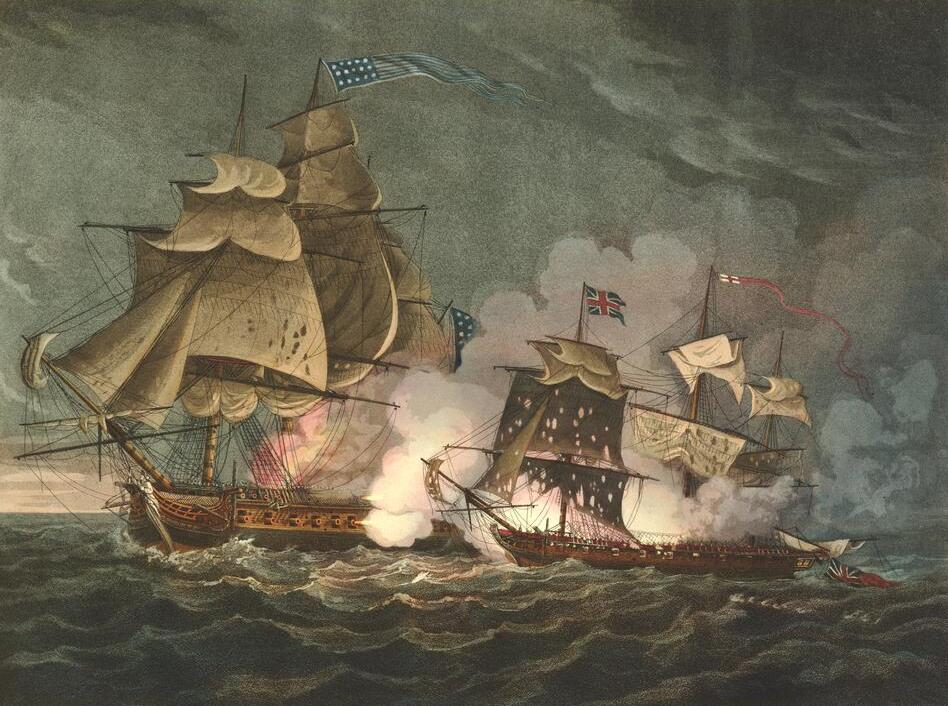
The 'Little Belt affair'. HMS Little Belt and USS President exchange fire

The President then returned, and asked if Bingham had struck. Bingham replied that he had not, and the President again withdrew. A messenger was sent out to the damaged Little Belt by Rodgers the following morning, lamenting the 'unfortunate affair', and insisting that he would not have attacked, had Little Belt not fired first. Bingham denied this, and turned down Rodgers' offer of putting into an American port for repairs, instead making for Halifax, hampered by a gale on the second day of the voyage which caused leaks in the already-damaged ship. Little Belt had nine killed outright, and had 23 wounded, some mortally. Two died the day after the battle. Rodgers claimed that the British ship had been mistaken for a larger frigate, and continued to claim that Bingham had fired first. Bingham wrote in his report

"a boat accordingly came, with an officer, and a message from Commodore Rodgers, of the President, United States frigate, to say, that he lamented much the unfortunate affair (as he termed it) that had happened, and that had he known our force was so inferior, he should not have fired at me. I asked his motive for having fired at all; his reply was, that we fired the first gun at him, which was positively not the case...[it is not] probable that a sloop of war, within pistol-shot of a large 44-gun frigate, should commence hostilities.

The Little Belt was later paid off and sold.

The Admiralty refused to try Bingham by court-martial, and the matter was never successfully concluded, both governments supporting their respective captains' version of events. Bingham was promoted to post captain on 7 February 1812.

== Later life ==
In 1812 the Duke of Clarence (the future King William IV) arranged for Bingham to be esquire to the proxy at the installation of Richard Goodwin Keats to the Order of the Bath. Bingham continued in the Navy, being appointed to command HMS Myrtle on 18 November 1813, followed by being made flag captain to Rear-Admiral Robert Otway aboard HMS Dover on 25 September 1819. He was appointed to HMS Thetis on 9 November 1826. He drowned in 1830.

On 20 August 1830, the Thetis was anchored off Puna Island (Ecuador). Captain Bingham chose to go ashore to Guayaquil. During transit, the barge was swamped resulting in the deaths of the ship's chaplain and Captain Bingham.

== Family ==
Bingham had married Emily Kingsman on 11 March 1813, and the couple had four sons and daughter. Two, Arthur Maunsel Bingham and Thomas Henry Bingham also had naval careers, whilst the third son, William Poulet Bingham became a lieutenant-colonel of the 64th Regiment. The fourth son was Francis Robert Bertie Bingham, and the daughter was Emily Agnata Harriet Bingham.
