= Little Belt affair =

1811 naval battle between US and Great Britain

- Part of the events leading to the War of 1812
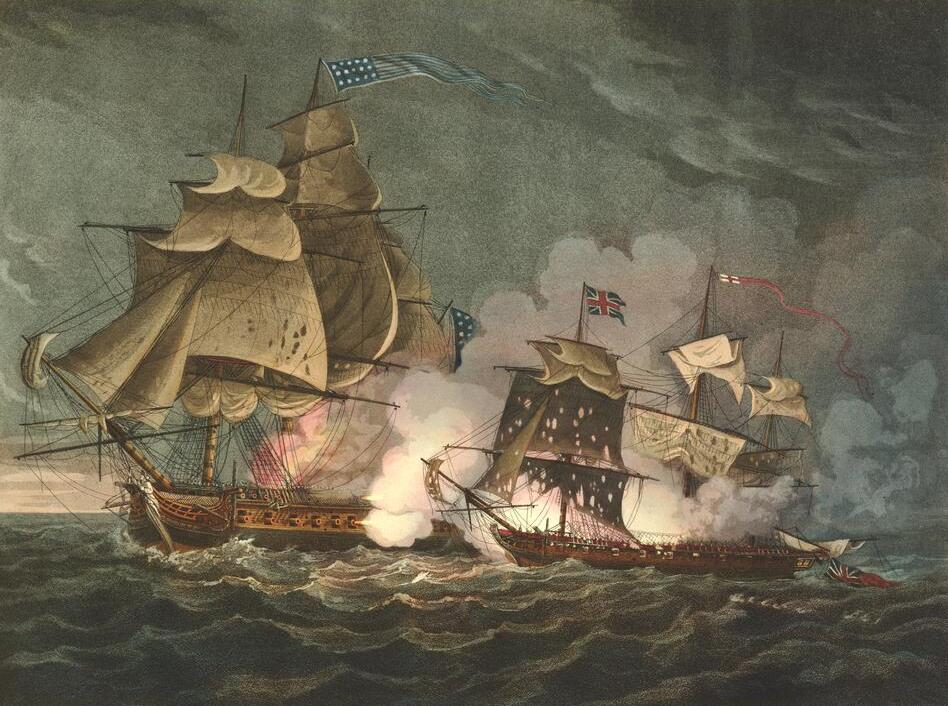
- A 16 May 1811 engraving of USS President battling HMS Little Belt
| Date | 16 May 1811 |
| Location | Off North Carolina, Atlantic Ocean |
| Result | American victory |

Belligerents
| United Kingdom | United States |

Commanders and leaders
| (United Kingdom) Arthur Bingham | (United States) John Rodgers |

Strength
| 1 sloop-of-war 20 guns | 1 frigate 56 guns |

Casualties and losses
| 11 killed 21 wounded 1 sloop-of-war severely damaged | 1 wounded 1 frigate slightly damaged |

The Little Belt affair was a naval battle off the coast of North Carolina on the night of 16 May 1811 between the United States frigate USS President and the British sixth-rate sloop-of-war HMS Little Belt. After a chase and exchange of fire, Little Belt suffered 32 casualties and was badly damaged; President lost one man. It was one of many incidents that led to the War of 1812.

== Background ==
The Little Belt affair occurred four years after the Chesapeake–Leopard affair of 1807, in which HMS Leopard had attacked USS Chesapeake, killing three, wounding eighteen, and putting four of her sailors on trial for desertion. It was fifteen days after an incident involving HMS Guerriere, a frigate. On 1 May 1811, HMS Guerriere had stopped the brig USS Spitfire off Sandy Hook, New Jersey and had impressed Maine resident John Diggio, the apprentice sailing master of Spitfire. Secretary of the Navy Paul Hamilton had ordered President, along with USS Argus, to patrol the coastal areas from the Carolinas to New York. HMS Little Belt had originally been the Danish ship Lillebælt, before being captured by the British in the 1807 Battle of Copenhagen.

== Affair ==
=== Chase ===
Commodore John Rodgers, commanding the frigate President, had left Annapolis several days earlier and was aware of the Guerriere incident. He was off the Virginia Capes and sailing up the coast towards New York. Little Belt was sighted to the east at about noon on 16 May. Believing her to be Guerriere, Rodgers pursued. Little Belt's captain, Arthur Bingham, had spotted President one hour earlier. Bingham signaled President asking for identification but received none, but he noticed a blue pennant showing the ship's nationality was American. Bingham continued south, but Rodgers continued his pursuit because he wanted to know the stranger's identity. By 15:30, President was close enough for Rodgers to make out part of the British ship's stern. The angle at which he saw her made her appear larger than she was. Little Belt was much smaller than President, with a displacement of only 460 tons in contrast to President's 1,576. The sloop mounted 20 guns, while President carried 56.

=== Battle ===
The British and American accounts disagree on what followed. As President closed with Little Belt, Bingham thought the frigate was manoeuvreing to rake his ship with gunfire. Bingham wore ship three times to avoid the threat. The ships were not within hailing range until long after sunset. At about 10:15, each captain demanded the other identify his ship. Each refused to answer before the other. Each captain later claimed he had been the first to ask. Shortly after this a shot was fired, but it is disputed who shot it. The ships were soon engaged in a battle which the sloop had no chance of winning. After fifteen minutes, most of Bingham's guns had been put out of action, and Rodgers ordered a cease fire. President returned and Rodgers asked Bingham if he had struck his flag to surrender. Bingham replied he had not, and President withdrew.

== Aftermath ==
President had only one man injured. Little Belt suffered nine dead and 23 injured (two of them fatally). The sloop was also badly damaged in the encounter. The next morning, Lieutenant John Creighton went from President to Little Belt to lament the affair and offer Bingham space at any American port, which he declined. Bingham asked why President had attacked his much smaller ship. Creighton said it was because Little Belt had "provoked" the action. Bingham rejected the charge.

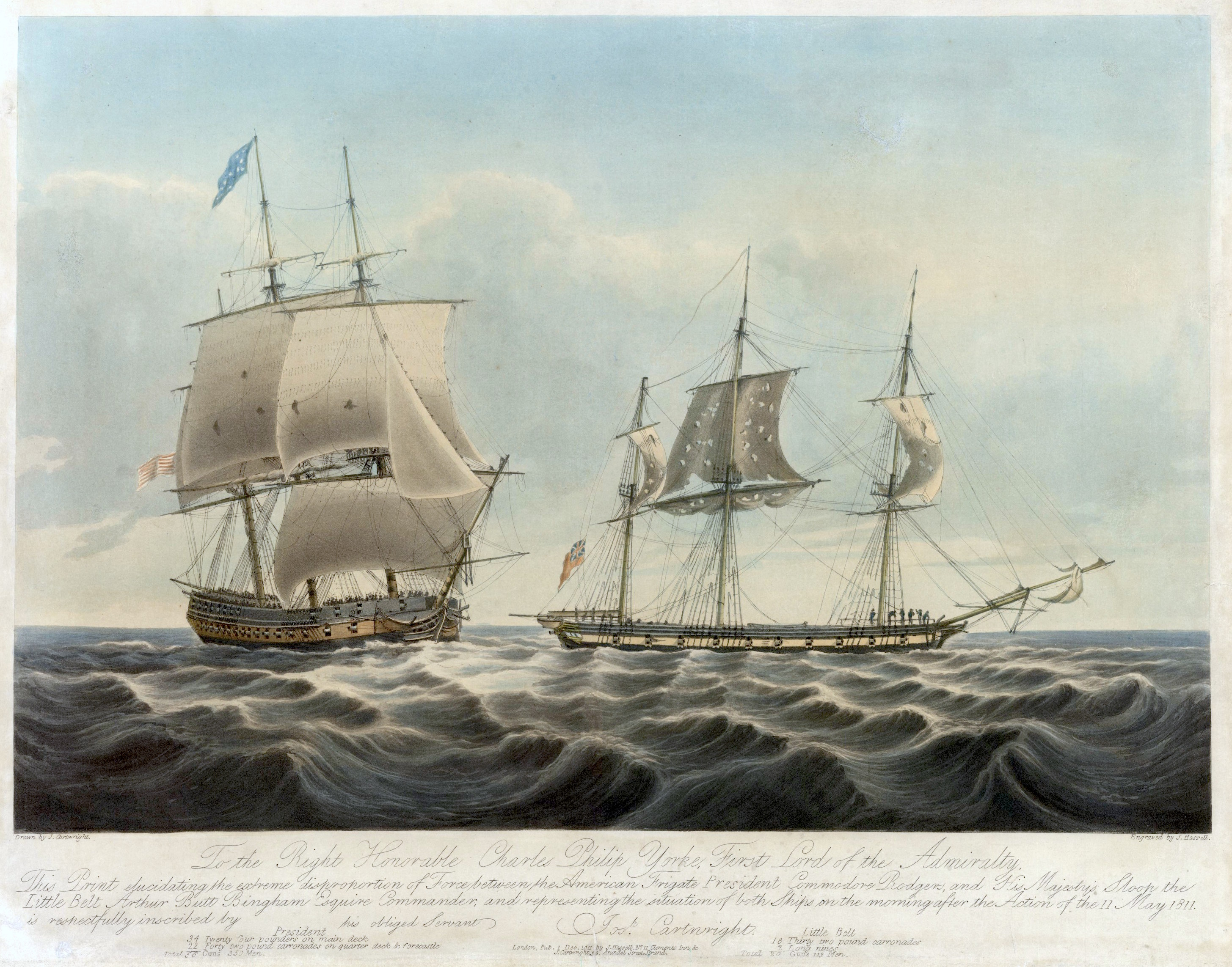
President and HMS Little Belt

President sailed on to New York City, and Little Belt went to the North America Station in Halifax, Nova Scotia, escorted by HMS Goree. The British and American governments argued about the encounter for months. Rodgers insisted that he had mistaken the sloop for a frigate and was adamant that Bingham had fired first. The Admiralty expressed their confidence in Bingham and promoted him to post-captain on 7 February 1812.

On 19 August 1812, after war had finally broken out, HMS Guerriere sailed into her ill-fated action against USS Constitution. Painted across her foretopsail were the words "NOT THE LITTLE BELT".

== See also ==
- Timeline of the War of 1812
- Chesapeake–Leopard affair
