= William Bingham (disambiguation) =

William Bingham (1752–1804) was an American statesman, founder of the Bank of North America.

William or Billy Bingham may also refer to:

- Billy Bingham (1931–2022), Northern Irish former footballer
- Billy Bingham (footballer, born 1990), English footballer
- William Bingham (priest) (1743–1819), Archdeacon of London
- William Bingham (Pittsburgh) (1808–1873), mayor of Pittsburgh during the 1850s
- Bingo Bingham (William Horace Bingham, 1885–?), American baseball player
- William Bingham (sprinter), winner of the 600 yards at the 1916 USA Indoor Track and Field Championships
