= USS Babbitt =

Wickes-class destroyer

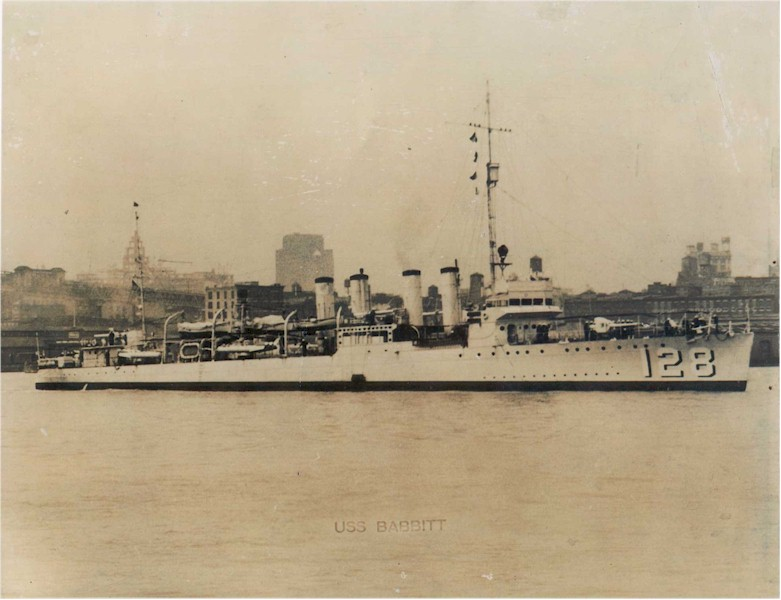
- USS Babbitt in harbor

History

United States
- Name: Babbitt
- Namesake: Fitz Babbitt
- Builder: New York Shipbuilding Corporation, Camden, New Jersey
- Cost: $1,437,440 (hull and machinery)
- Laid down: 19 February 1918
- Launched: 30 September 1918
- Commissioned: 24 October 1919
- Decommissioned: 15 June 1922
- Identification: DD-128
- Recommissioned: 4 April 1930
- Decommissioned: 25 January 1946
- Reclassified: AG-102, 10 June 1945
- Stricken: 25 February 1946
- Fate: Sold for scrapping, 5 June 1946

General characteristics
- Class & type: Wickes-class destroyer
- Displacement: 1,211 tons
- Length: 314 ft 5 in (95.8 m)
- Beam: 31 ft 8 in (9.7 m)
- Draft: 8 ft 8 in (2.6 m) Ship propulsion=
- Speed: 35 knots (65 km/h)
- Complement: 113 officers and enlisted
- Armament: 4 × 4-inch/50-caliber guns (102 mm); 2 × 3 in (76 mm) guns; 12 × 21 in (533 mm) torpedo tubes; 1 × depth charge projector; 2 × depth charge tracks

USS Babbitt (DD–128) was a Wickes-class destroyer in the United States Navy during World War I and World War II, later classified as AG-102. She was named for Fitz Babbitt. As of 2010, no other ship in the United States Navy has borne this name.

== Construction and commissioning ==
Babbitt was launched on 30 September 1918 at New York Shipbuilding Corporation, Camden, New Jersey, sponsored by Miss Lucile Burlin. The destroyer was commissioned on 24 October 1919 and reported to the Pacific Fleet.

== Service history ==
Babbitt served with the Pacific Fleet on maneuvers and exercises until going out of commission at San Diego on 15 June 1922. Upon recommissioning on 4 April 1930, Babbitt reported to the Pacific Fleet and served along the west coast until February 1931, when she proceeded to the Atlantic Ocean. Between February 1931 and May 1932, she operated with Destroyer Squadron, Scouting Force, along the eastern seaboard, in the West Indies, the Gulf of Mexico, and in the Panama Canal Zone. During May 1932 to April 1933, Babbitt served at the Naval Torpedo Station, Newport, and made a cruise to Chile conducting exercises with experimental torpedoes. She was assigned to Rotating Reserve Destroyer Squadron 19 at Norfolk between 25 May and 20 October 1933, and then assumed reduced commission status until January 1935. While in this status, she operated with the Training Squadron, Scouting Force, training reserves.

For a brief period between January and May 1935, she returned to Rotating Reserve Destroyer Squadron 19. Placed in full commission 15 May 1935, Babbitt served with the Midshipmen's Coastal Cruise Detachment and then, for two years, with the Special Service Squadron in the Cuban-Puerto Rican area. In April 1939, she participated in the opening of the New York World's Fair. Subsequently, she was attached to Destroyer Squadron 27 Patrol Force, on Neutrality Patrol and convoy escort duty along the Atlantic and Caribbean coastlines.

=== World War II ===
Babbitt operated as a convoy escort in the waters off Iceland, along the east and gulf coasts of the United States and in the Caribbean Sea. Between 10 March 1943 and 21 March 1944, she also completed five trans-Atlantic escort crossings one to England and four to North Africa.

=== Convoys escorted ===
Convoy	Escort Group	Dates	Notes
HX 152		30 Sept-9 Oct 1941	from Newfoundland to Iceland prior to US declaration of war; 1 ship torpedoed
ON 26		20-29 Oct 1941	33 ships escorted without loss from Iceland to Newfoundland prior to US declaration of war
ON 28		31 Oct-3 Nov 1941	from Iceland to Newfoundland prior to US declaration of war; 1 ship torpedoed
HX 160		17-25 Nov 1941	62 ships escorted without loss from Newfoundland to Iceland prior to US declaration of war
ON 41		4-10 Dec 1941	37 ships escorted without loss from Iceland to Newfoundland: war declared during convoy
HX 167		29 Dec 1941-7 Jan 1942	41 ships escorted without loss from Newfoundland to Iceland
ON 55		15-18 Jan 1942	from Iceland to Newfoundland; 2 ships torpedoed & sunk
HX 174		9-16 Feb 1942	27 ships escorted without loss from Newfoundland to Iceland
SC 71		5 March 1942	Iceland shuttle
SC 73		17 March 1942	Iceland shuttle
SC 75		24 March 1942	Iceland shuttle
ON 86		15–17 April 1942	Iceland shuttle
ON 90		29 April-4 May 1942	Iceland shuttle
SC 81		5 May 1942	Iceland shuttle
ON 94		13–16 May 1942	Iceland shuttle
ON 98		27–30 May 1942	Iceland shuttle
ON 102		14–15 June 1942	Iceland shuttle
ON 106		24–27 June 1942	Iceland shuttle
ON 110		7–11 July 1942	Iceland shuttle
SC 91		19 July 1942	Iceland shuttle
ON 116		25–29 July 1942	Iceland shuttle
ON 120		9-14 Aug 1942	Iceland shuttle
ON 125	MOEF group A3	29 Aug-7 Sept 1942	28 ships escorted without loss from Iceland to Newfoundland
SC 110		29 Nov-2 Dec 1942	Iceland shuttle
ON 152		11-15 Dec 1942	Iceland shuttle
SC 112		16-19 Dec 1942	Iceland shuttle
SC 114			Iceland shuttle
SC 116		22-23 Jan 1943	Iceland shuttle
ON 162		26-27 Jan 1943	Iceland shuttle
SC 118		6-8 Feb 1943	Iceland shuttle
ON 171		7–9 March 1943	Iceland shuttle
SC 121		9–11 March 1943	Iceland shuttle
Convoys HX 229/SC 122		19–21 March 1943	Iceland shuttle
UC 2		9–23 April 1943	11 ships escorted without loss from Liverpool to Curacao
UGS 8A		15 May-1 June 1943	80 ships escorted without loss from Chesapeake Bay to Mediterranean Sea
UGS 25		24–27 November 1943	59 ships escorted without loss from Chesapeake Bay to Mediterranean Sea
UGS 33		3–13 February 1944	4 ships escorted without loss from Chesapeake Bay to Mediterranean Sea
GUS 32		7–23 March 1944	91 ships escorted without loss from Mediterranean Sea to Chesapeake Bay

=== Auxiliary service ===
On 2 February 1945, Babbitt reported to the Underwater Sound Laboratory, New London, Connecticut, for experimental sonar work. On 10 June 1945, her classification was changed to AG-102. She remained on experimental duty until December 1945, when she entered New York Navy Yard for pre-inactivation overhaul. Babbitt was decommissioned on 25 January 1946 and sold on 5 June 1946.

== Awards ==
- American Defense Service Medal
- European–African–Middle Eastern Campaign Medal with one battle star for World War II service
- World War II Victory Medal

Babbitt received her battle star for the escort of Convoy SC 121.

== Bibliography ==
- Wright, Christopher C. (1986). "The U.S. Fleet at the New York World's Fair, 1939: Some Photographs from the Collection of the Late William H. Davis". Warship International. XXIII (3): 273–285. ISSN 0043-0374.
