= Clarendon (1792 ship) =

Westindiaman (1792–1815)

History

Great Britain
- Builder: Lancaster
- Launched: 1792
- Fate: Wrecked 7 April 1815

General characteristics
- Tons burthen: 393, or 399, or 405 (bm)
- Armament: 1795: 2 × 3-pounder guns + 2 × 9-pounder carronades; 1814:10 × 12-pounder carronades; 1815:8 × 12-pounder + 2 × 18-pounder carronades

Clarendon was built at Lancaster in 1792 as a West Indiaman. She spent most of her career sailing between England and Jamaica. She then became a transport based out of Hull. She wrecked on 7 April 1815, while sailing from Bermuda to the United States as a cartel bringing prisoners of war from the British capture of USS President.

== Career ==
Clarendon first appeared in Lloyd's Register (LR) in the volume for 1792.

Year	Master	Owner	Trade	Source & notes
1792	Barnes	Peatt & Co.	Lancaster–London; London–Jamaica	LR
1796	Barnes; G.Bell	Peat & Co.	London–Jamaica	LR
1797	G.Bell	Timperon	London–Jamaica	LR
1805	G.Bell; A.Scott	Timperon; Dodds	London–Jamaica	LR
1810	Cammell	Bonnell	London–Rio de Janeiro	LR; small repairs 1809
1813	F.Foster; G.Garness	Bonnell	London–Yucatán; Hull transport	LR; thorough repair 1811
1814	G.Garnish	Hill & Co.	Hull transport	LR; thorough repair 1811
1815	J.Garness	W.Bunny & co.	Hull transport	Register of Shipping; large repair 1811

== Fate ==
The cartel Clarendon, Garness, master, brought 400 prisoners from the USS President from Bermuda back to New York. On 7 April 1815 she grounded at Sandy Hook but crew, passengers, and prisoners were all saved.
