= Malvina (1807 ship) =

History

France
- Name: Malvina
- Namesake: Malvina
- Commissioned: 1807, Nantes
- Captured: 1808

General characteristics
- Complement: 60
- Armament: 14 guns

Malvina was a privateer brig from Nantes commissioned circa 1807. The Royal Navy captured her in 1808.

On 28 January 1808 Malvina, of Nantes, captured the Danish ship Margaretta, and took her into Nantes. Margaretta had been sailing from Gibraltar to London with a cargo of potash.

On 15 February 1808 HMS Guerriere captured near Barbados at 44°N 13°W the French privateer brig Malvina. Malvina was commanded by René Salaün. She had been travelling with her prize, the British ship Juliana, which Guerriere recaptured. Guerriere sailed on to Barbados but sent Malvina and Juliana back to England. Malvina had been on her way to Guadeloupe. Malvina arrived in the Thames on 10 March.

Captain Salaün did not return to Nantes from an English prison until 26 December 1812.
