= Peggy (1793 ship) =

History

Great Britain
- Name: Peggy
- Owner: 1801:Transport Board; 1804:W. Boyd & Co.; 1810:James Thomas; 1814: Tibbitt & Co., London; 1819:Palmer & Co.
- Builder: Gillet & Co., Calcutta
- Launched: 1793 (Note: There is some ambiguity about the launch year. Other dates proffered include 1783, 1791, 1792, 1794, and 1798. The reason to prefer 1793 is that Phipps was closest to the registration records from Calcutta.)
- Renamed: Juliana in 1801
- Fate: Wrecked 1821

General characteristics
- Class & type: Barque
- Tons burthen: 498 or 502, or 50279/94, or 512, or 516, or 51672/94 (bm)
- Length: 112 ft 5 in (34.3 m) (overall); 87 ft 9 in (26.7 m) (keel)
- Beam: 32 ft 8 in (10.0 m)
- Depth of hold: 15 ft 8 in (4.8 m)
- Complement: 1810:55; 1812:45
- Armament: 1810:12 × 12&6-pounder guns; 1812:12 × 12&6-pounder guns
- Notes: Teak-built; three masts and two decks

Peggy was built at Calcutta in 1793 and initially sailed in the Indian coastal and Far East trade. In 1801 she assumed British registry and her name was changed to Juliana. Her owners sold her to the Transport Board but in 1804 the government resold her and she was sailing as a West Indiaman between London and Antigua. She then made two voyages for the British East India Company (EIC), and one voyage to Hobart, Van Dieman's Land, transporting convicts. On her return from this voyage she wrecked in 1821 on the English coast.

== Career ==
Juliana was accepted into the Registry of Great Britain on 14 December 1801. She was sold to the Government for service with the Transport Board.

Juliana entered Lloyd's Register for 1805 with F. Smith, master, Boyd, owner, and trade London-Antigua. She also enters the Register of Shipping in 1805, but with Bourne, master, Beatson, owner, and location London. In 1806 the information in the Register of Shipping matches that in Lloyd's Register.

On 15 February 1808 HMS Guerriere captured near Barbados the French privateer brig Malvina. Malvina was commanded by René Salaun and carried 14 guns and 60 men. She had been travelling with her prize, the British ship Juliana, which Guerriere recaptured. (Note: An examination of Lloyd's Register suggests the recaptured Juliana was most probably the Juliana of this article.)

Lloyd's Register for 1810 shows Juliana's master changing from F. Smith to Toussaint, her owner from Boyd & Co. to Thomas & Co., and her trade from London—Antigua to London—Bengal. In 1810 the EIC chartered Juliana for one voyage. On her return it chartered her for a second voyage.

First EIC voyage (1810–1811): Captain Jeremiah Richard James Toussaint acquired a letter of marque on 7 April 1810. He sailed from Portsmouth on 11 May 1810, bound for Bengal. Juliana was at Madeira on 27 May. On 4 July she and the convoy she was part of were "all well" at 8°52′S 26°30′W. They were under the escort of the frigate HMS Phoenix, which was going out to serve in the East Indies. Juliana reached Madras on 12 October, and arrived at Calcutta on 1 December. Homeward bound she was at Saugor on 26 January 1811, reached St Helena on 11 May St Helena, and arrived at the Downs on 13 July.

Second EIC voyage (1812–1813): Captain Richard Rawes acquired a letter of marque on 27 April 1812. He sailed from Falmouth on 15 May 1812, bound for Batavia, by then in English hands. Juliana reached Madeira on 3 June. On 7 July she and the convoy she was with were "all well" at 3°36′N 15°30′W. Juliana arrived at Batavia on 30 September. Homeward bound, she reached the Cape of Good Hope on 19 March 1813 and St Helena on 10 April, and arrived at the Downs on 10 August.

The EIC released Juliana from service, and Tibbitt & Co. purchased her for private trade to India under a licence from the EIC. He had applied for a licence on 22 May 1815 and had received it on 31 March.

On 18 May 1820, a heavy gale drove Juliana, Ogilvie, master, coming from Penang, out of the Downs and into the North Sea, costing her two anchors and cables. She returned three days later and received replacement anchors and cables from Ransgate.

Convict transport (1820): In 1820 Juliana transported convicts to Hobart. She left on 3 September 1820 and arrived at Hobart on 28 December. She embarked 160 male convicts, one of whom died en route.

The Register of Shipping for 1821–22 showed Juliana with Ogilvie, master, Palmer, owner, and trade London—New South Wales.

== Fate ==
On 23 December 1821 a gale blew Juliana, Ogilvie, master, from Bengal, out of the Ramsgate Roads and cost her two anchors and a cable. She sent a boat to shore to get replacements, and the boat was supposed to deliver them on the evening tide. However, Juliana was wrecked on the Kentish Knock at the mouth of the River Thames. Forty lives were lost; there were only two survivors.
