= HMS Amfitrite (1804) =

Frigate of the Royal Navy

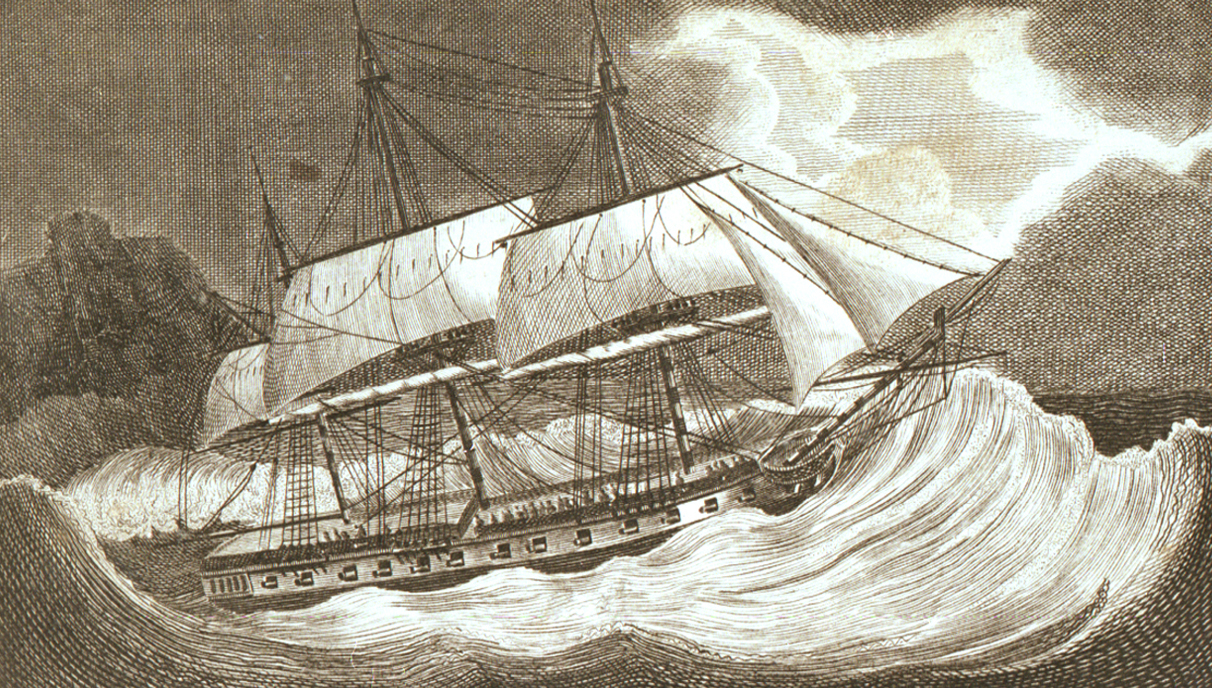
- Blanche being wrecked on 4 March 1807

History

Spain
- Name: Amfitrite
- Fate: Captured on 25 November 1804

United Kingdom
- Name: HMS Amfitrite
- Acquired: By capture on 25 November 1804
- Renamed: HMS Blanche in 1805
- Honours and awards: Naval General Service Medal with clasp "Blanche 19 July 1806"
- Fate: Wrecked off Ushant on 4 March 1807

General characteristics
- Class & type: 38-gun fifth-rate frigate
- Tons burthen: 1,036 tons
- Length: 150 ft (46 m)
- Beam: 40 ft (12 m)
- Propulsion: Sails
- Armament: 38 guns

HMS Amfitrite was a 38-gun fifth-rate frigate of the Royal Navy. She had previously served with the Spanish Navy before she was captured during the Napoleonic Wars and commissioned into the Royal Navy. The Admiralty renamed her HMS Blanche after she had spent just over a year as Amfitrite. She was the only ship in the Navy to bear this specific name, though a number of other ships used the conventional English spelling and were named HMS Amphitrite. Her most notable feat was her capture of Guerriere in 1806. Blanche was wrecked in 1807.

== Capture ==
Amfitrite was sailing off the Spanish Atlantic coast in November 1804, when the 74-gun third rate HMS Donegal, then watching the port of Cádiz under the command of Captain Richard Strachan, spotted her. Donegal gave chase and after 46 hours, Amfitrite lost her mizzen-top-mast, which enabled Donegal to overhaul her.

The engagement lasted only eight minutes, and resulted in a number of deaths, including that of the Spanish captain, who fell to a musket ball. The Amfitrite surrendered and after being searched, was found to be laden with stores and carrying dispatches from Cádiz to Tenerife and Havana.

She was taken over and later commissioned into the Navy as HMS Amfitrite. In early 1805, she was commanded by Robert Corbet. She was renamed HMS Blanche on 3 December 1805.

== HMS Blanche ==
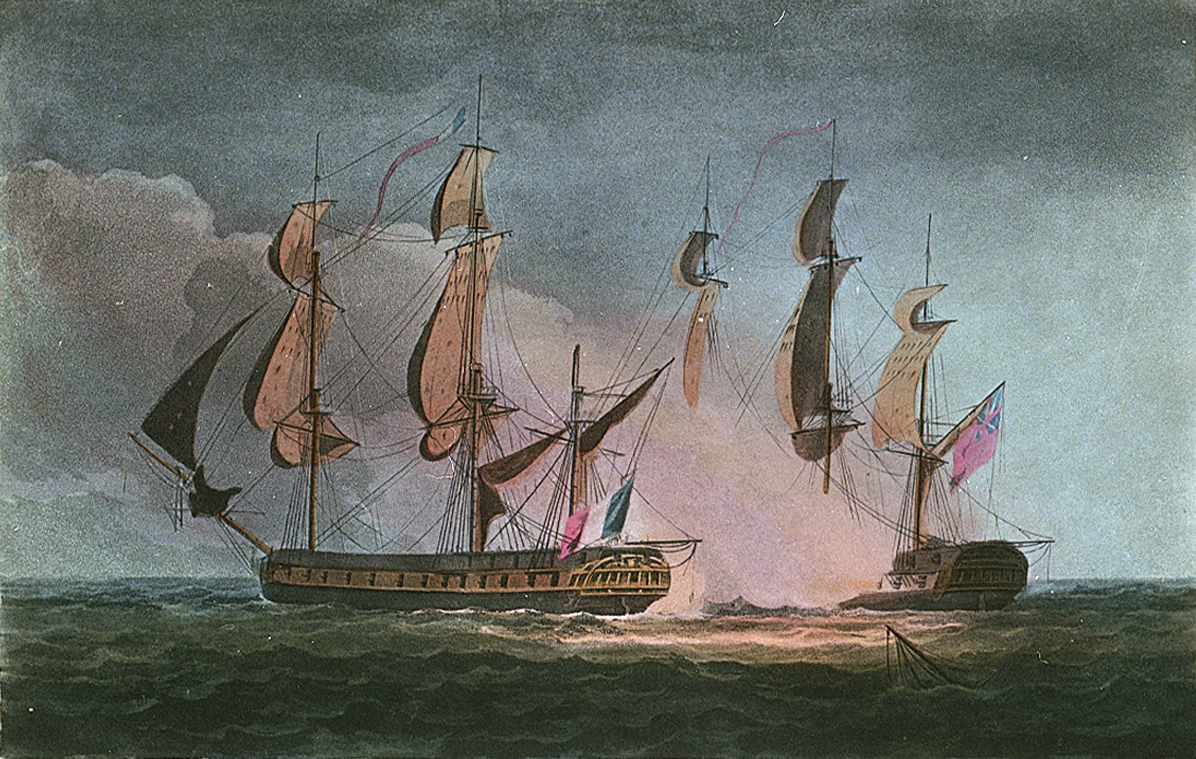
Blanche capturing Guerrière on 19 July 1806

Captain Thomas Lavie took command of Blanche in 1806 and patrolled off the English coast, protecting British shipping from French warships and privateers. On 28 March 1806, a French squadron consisting of the French frigates Guerrière, Revanche and Sirène, and the brig-corvette Néarque, all under the command of Amand Leduc, were dispatched from Lorient, with orders to attack and destroy British and Russian whalers in the Arctic, off Greenland. Guerrière became separated from the rest of the squadron, but was able to capture and burn several whaling vessels. By 16 July, news of her activities, including a recent sighting off the Faroe Islands reached Captain Lavie aboard Blanche, then off the Shetland Islands. Blanche quickly sailed to the reported area and on 18 July, sighted Guerrière. By this point Guerrière was carrying 50 guns, to the Blanche's 46.

Blanche quickly closed the distance, but Guerrière, perhaps mistaking the British frigate for one of her squadron, did not initially take action. Blanche opened fire at about 15 minutes past midnight, firing two broadsides before the Guerrière could respond. A fierce fight followed, with Guerrière eventually surrendering at half past one that morning, having lost her mizzenmast. Blanche had suffered light damage and four men wounded out of her complement of 265. Guerrière had suffered considerable damage to her lower masts, as well as to her hull, both above and below the waterline. Out of her complement of 350, 20 of her officers, seamen and marines had been killed, whilst another 30 were wounded, ten of them seriously. Many of the French crew had been ill below decks during the engagement. Guerrière had been aiming to cripple the Blanche by firing to bring down her masts, so that the Guerrière might escape. When this failed, Guerrière was eventually worn down and forced to strike.

Blanche escorted Guerrière back to Britain, arriving with her prize on 26 July in Yarmouth Roads. Guerrière was commissioned into the Navy as HMS Guerriere, after a repair and refit that brought her to 48 guns. Lavie was knighted and Blanche's first lieutenant received a promotion. In 1847 the Admiralty issued the Naval General Service Medal with clasp "Blanche 19 July 1806" to all surviving members of the crew that claimed it.

Captain Lavie continued to serve as commander of Blanche and was part of a squadron under Captain Richard Keats blockading the port of Rochefort. On 15 January 1807 Lavie and Blanche intercepted George Washington off Bordeaux. Lavie found that she was carrying Captain Kargarian (Kergariou), the former commander of the French frigate Valeureuse, and 306 of his officers and men, but no stores from Valeureuse. Lavie took the Frenchmen aboard Blanche as his prisoners. He then sent George Washington to England.

== Fate ==
On 4 March 1807, Blanche was wrecked whilst cruising off Ushant. Forty-five of her crew were lost, of whom 20 were Royal Marines. All of the officers were saved, as were 180 seamen and 25 marines. The French marched the survivors 30 miles (48 km) to Brest, where they were housed in the naval hospital. The crew would remain prisoners for seven years until Napoleon's abdication. The court martial on 2 June 1814 honourably acquitted Lavie and his officers of the loss of Blanche. The court found that iron stanchions, cranks, and arms under the half-deck had affected her compasses. This in turn had caused her navigation to be faulty.
