= HMS Little Belt (1807) =

Post ship of the Royal Navy

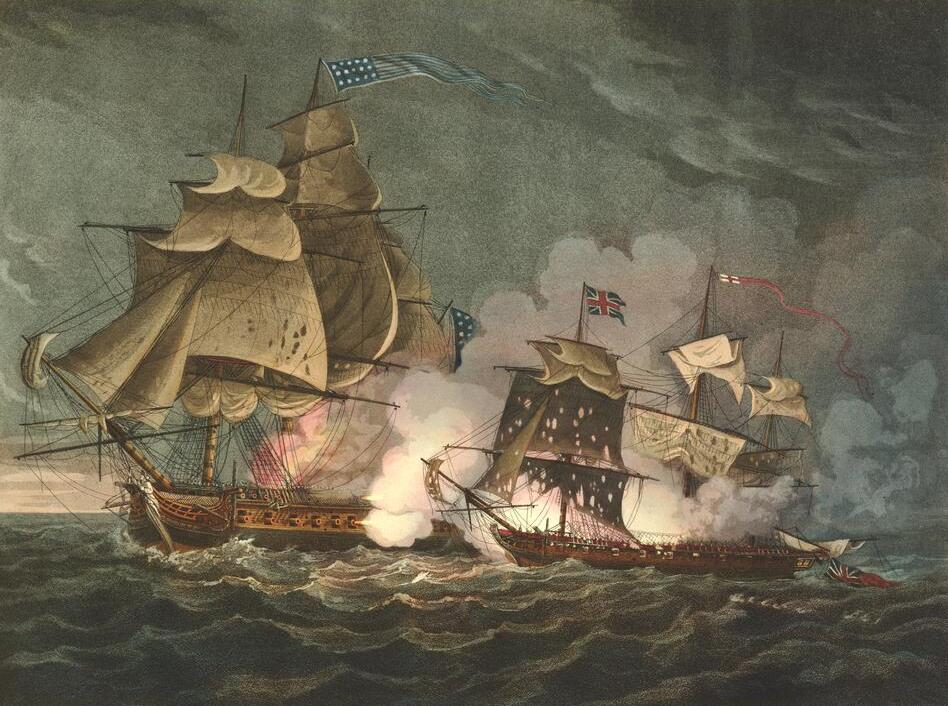
- HMS Little Belt, at right, and the USS President fire upon each other

History

Denmark
- Name: Lillebælt
- Namesake: The Little Belt strait off Jutland
- Builder: Fugelsang at the Royal Shipyard, Copenhagen
- Launched: 31 August 1801
- In service: February 1802
- Captured: Captured by British at the Battle of Copenhagen on 7 September 1807

United Kingdom
- Name: HMS Little Belt
- Acquired: Captured at the Battle of Copenhagen on 7 September 1807
- Commissioned: April 1808
- Fate: Sold in 1811

General characteristics
- Class & type: 20-gun post ship
- Tons burthen: 460 5/94 (bm)
- Length: 116 ft 4 in (35.5 m) (overall); 94 ft 0 in (28.7 m) (keel)
- Beam: 30 ft 4 in (9.2 m)
- Depth of hold: 12 ft 5 1/2 in (3.8 m)
- Propulsion: Sails
- Complement: 121
- Armament: Danish service: 20 × 30-pounder carronades + 2 × 8-pounder chase guns British service: 18 × 32-pounder carronades + 2 × 9-pounder chase guns

Lillebælt was a 22-gun frigate of the Royal Dano-Norwegian Navy launched in 1801. The Danes surrendered her to the Royal Navy in 1807 and she became the 20-gun post ship HMS Little Belt. In a single-ship action in 1811 while the United States of America was at peace with Great Britain, USS President fired on Little Belt, ostensibly believing her to be HMS Guerriere, which had recently impressed USS Spitfire's sailing master. History is not sure who fired first, both sides claiming the other had fired initially. This action was the eponymous "Little Belt affair". British captain Arthur Batt Bingham maintained that the Americans fired first and that although his vessel had suffered heavy casualties he had not at any time surrendered. Little Belt was broken up in 1819.

== Career ==
She was built in 1801 to a design by P.C. Hohlenberg as the 460-ton Danish 22-gun let fregat (light frigate or corvette) Lillebælt. She was among the vessels that the British seized after the Battle of Copenhagen on 7 September 1807. She then sailed in convoy with the Cruizer-class brig-sloop Calypso to Britain, arriving on 24 October at Woolwich. She was fitted there until 14 May 1809.

The Royal Navy commissioned her under the anglicised version of her name and placed under the command of John Crispo. The ship's name refers to the Little Belt, a strait between the island of Funen and the Jutland Peninsula in Denmark – a location of great strategic and symbolic importance to Danes.

By 1808 she was off the African coast, but later returned to Britain.

In May 1809 she recaptured and sent into Portsmouth the Swedish ship Neptunus, which had been taken while sailing from Alicante. Then on 23 June Little Belt sailed for North America. Around this time the Royal Navy rescinded a decision to rename her Espion.

On 27 September 1810 Wolverine had been in pursuit of a French brig when Rhin joined the chase and after two and a half hours captured the quarry off the Lizard Point. The French vessel was the privateer San Joseph, of Saint Malo, under the command of a Joseph Wittevronghel, a Dane. San Joseph was one year old, about 100 tons burthen (bm), and armed with 14 guns though she was pierced for 16. She had only been out one day when the British captured her and had taken nothing. Little Belt had been in company with Wolverine during the chase. (Note: A first-class share of the prize money was worth £81 16s 9d; a sixth-class share, that of an ordinary seaman, was worth £1 5s 6d.)

Crispo was promoted to post-captain on 21 October 1810; Bingham succeeded him as commander of the Little Belt in November 1810. Bingham then sailed her to Halifax to operate off the North American coast.

By early 1811, Little Belt was in the Caribbean. On 25 March 1811, Little Belt captured the Spanish vessel Empressa. (Note: A first-class share of the prize money was worth £124 2s 11d; a sixth-class share of the prize money was worth £2 15s 10d.) At the time Little Belt was apparently under the command of Thomas Prickett. Colibri was either accompanying Little Belt or in sight of the capture and so shared in the prize money. Little Belt sent Empresa, which had been sailing to Africa, into Bermuda, where she arrived about 10 April.

== Little Belt affair ==
On 19 April Rear-Admiral Herbert Sawyer, based at Bermuda, instructed Bingham to meet Captain Pechell in Guerriere, who was cruising somewhere along the Atlantic seaboard between Charlestown and New York City. If he was unable to make contact with Pechell, Bingham was to cruise along the coast, protecting British ships and intercepting enemy vessels and eventually return to Halifax. Sawyer warned Bingham to be careful to avoid a clash with the Americans and to stay out of American ports except in the case of dire necessity. In the event, Bingham did not locate Guerriere, and continued to cruise along the coast.

On the morning of 10 May, as Little Belt was some 48 miles east of Cape Charles at the entrance to Chesapeake Bay, she sighted a strange sail in the distance. Bingham made signal #277, which requested the strange ship, if a British warship, to show her number. (Note: Marshall says the signal was #275, but with the same meaning.) The other ship did not reply and Bingham concluded that the mystery ship was a United States Navy frigate. He hoisted his colours and began to round Cape Hatteras. The frigate followed, catching up to Little Belt, and appeared to be trying to maneuver into a position to rake the sloop. Bingham veered three times to foil the American's attempts, while calling for the frigate to identify herself. Each time though the American demanded the same of Bingham. The frigate, actually the 44-gun USS President under Commodore John Rodgers had mistaken Little Belt for HMS Guerriere, which had recently been observed impressing the sailing master of USS Spitfire, John Diggio. Bingham claimed President then opened fire on Little Belt, although the Americans claimed Little Belt fired first. Regardless, an engagement began, lasting three-quarters of an hour. The British observed that President had a fire on board as she drew away.

President then returned, and asked if Bingham had struck. Bingham replied that he had not, and President again withdrew. Rodgers sent a messenger out to the damaged Little Belt the following morning, lamenting the "unfortunate affair", and insisting that he would not have fired had Little Belt not fired first. Bingham denied this, and turned down Rodger's offer of putting into an American port for repairs. Little Belt had nine killed outright, and had 23 wounded, including two mortally, who died the day after the battle. She was also badly damaged, with numerous shots between wind and water and with her masts and rigging damaged.

Bingham made for Halifax, hampered by a gale on the second day of the voyage which caused leaks. On 23 May Goree met up with Little Belt and the two then proceeded on to Halifax, which they reached on 28 May.

Rodgers claimed that he had mistaken Little Belt for a frigate and was adamant that Bingham had fired first. Bingham maintained that the Americans fired first and that he had not surrendered. The British Admiralty expressed their confidence in Bingham; it promoted him to post-captain on 7 February 1812. American officials refused to pay reparations for the incident, as the British had not paid reparations after the Chesapeake–Leopard affair.

On 4 August 1811, Little Belt captured the American ship Traveller. Traveller had sailed from Bordeaux with a cargo of brandy, quicksilver, silks, etc. She arrived at Portsmouth on 22 March.

== Fate ==
Little Belt was paid off later that year. She was sold at Deptford in November. She was broken up at Battersea, London in February 1819.

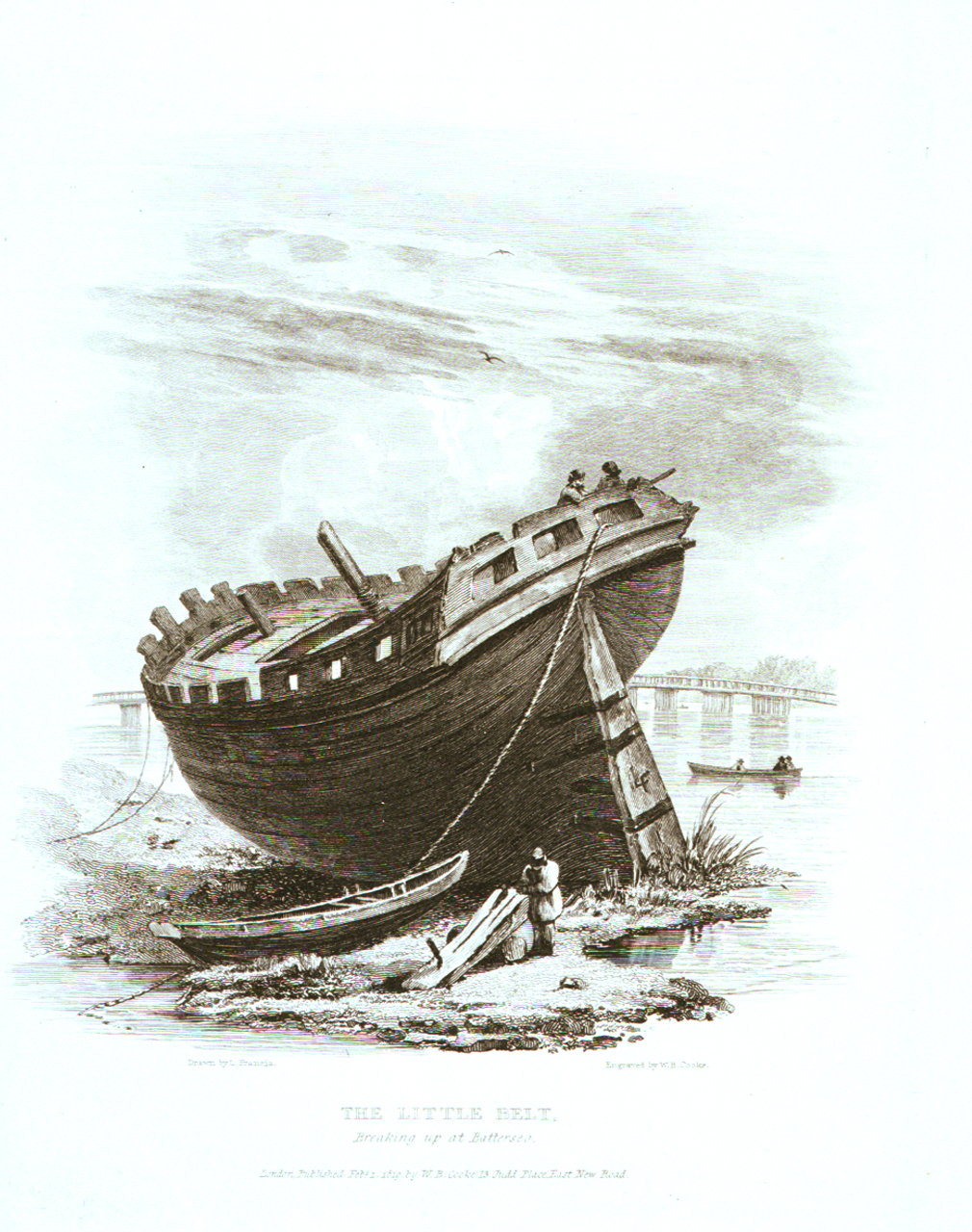
The Little Belt breaking up at Battersea
