= USS Spitfire (1803) =

Ammunition ship of the United States Navy

History

United States
- Name: USS Spitfire
- Launched: 13 June 1805
- Completed: 1803
- Acquired: 25 April 1805
- Commissioned: 25 April 1805
- Decommissioned: 3 August 1806
- In service: July 1807
- Out of service: December 1807
- Fate: broken up at the Norfolk Navy Yard in 1820

General characteristics
- Type: bomb ketch
- Displacement: 92 tons
- Propulsion: Ketch sail
- Complement: 25
- Armament: 1 × 13 in (330 mm) mortar; 2 × 9-pounder guns

USS Spitfire was a bomb ketch converted from a sloop that served the U.S. Navy during the republic's early years. She carried ammunition for the U.S. Navy warships in the Mediterranean in their battles with the Barbary pirates, and was later involved in the Little Belt affair prior to the War of 1812.

== Service history ==
The second ship to be so named by the Navy, Spitfire—a merchant sloop built in Connecticut in 1803—was purchased by the Navy at Boston, Massachusetts, on 25 April 1805; was commissioned the same day; and converted to a bomb ketch by the Boston Navy Yard. Commanded by Midshipman Daniel McNeill, Jr., Spitfire sailed for the Mediterranean on 23 June 1805 and reached Gibraltar on 1 August. The bomb ketch operated in the Mediterranean supporting American operations against the Barbary powers until sailing for home.. She arrived at, and was placed in ordinary at Norfolk, Virginia, on 3 August 1806.

The ship was reactivated in July 1807 under the command of Midshipman F. Cornelius de Kroff but remained at Norfolk until laid up again in December. On 1 May 1811, Spitfire was stopped by the fifth-rate HMS Guerriere off New Jersey's Sandy Hook. Guerriere impressed the apprentice sailing master of Spitfire, John Diggio, a citizen of Maine. This incident led to a confrontation fifteen days later between the frigates USS President and HMS Little Belt (mistaken for the Guerriere), as President attempted to recover Diggio. The ensuing Little Belt affair provoked a diplomatic furor between the United States and Great Britain. It contributed to the tense atmosphere between the two powers prior to the War of 1812. Spitfire was broken up at the Norfolk Navy Yard in 1820.
