= USS President (1800) =

United States Navy frigate

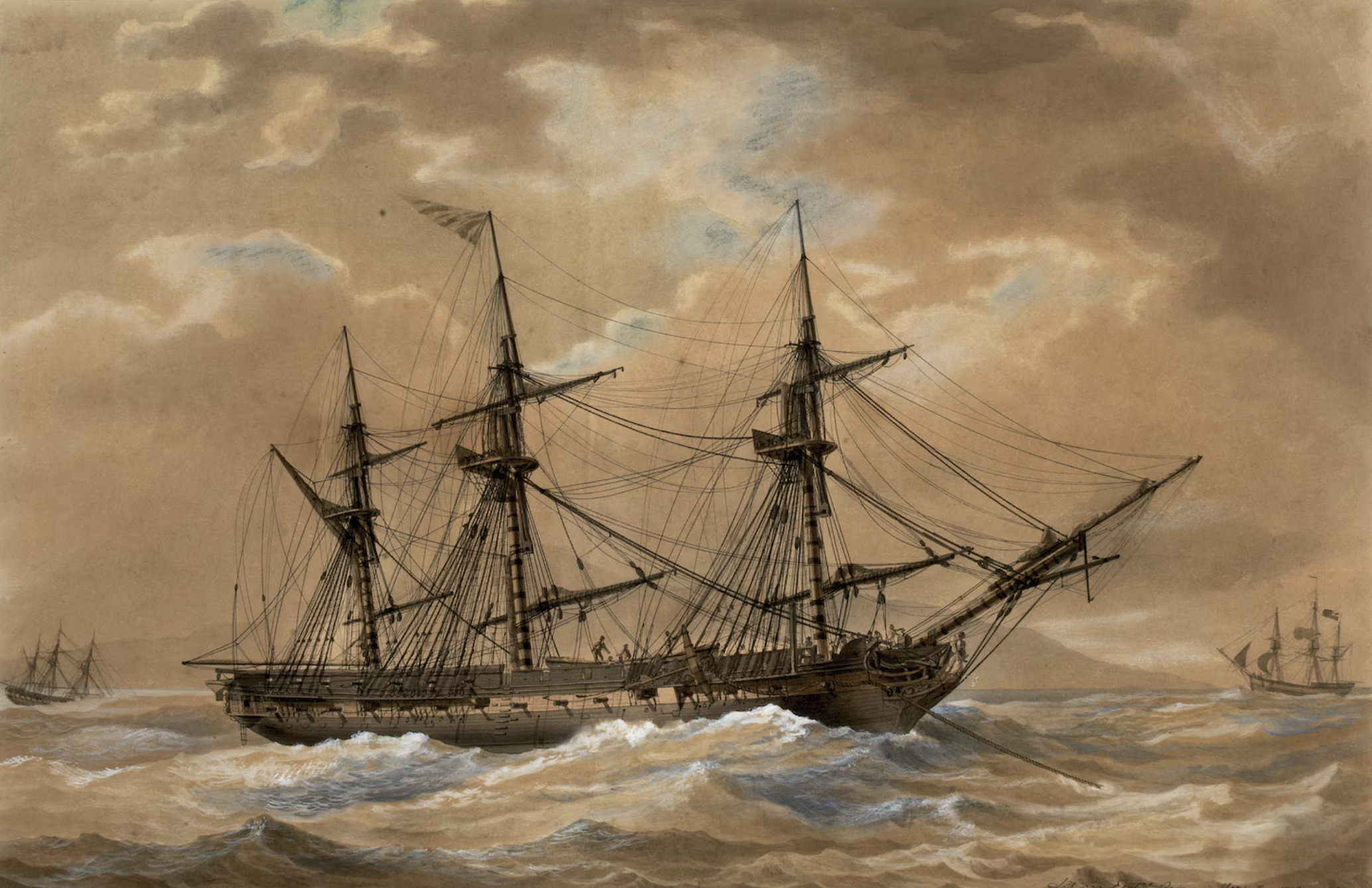
- 1802 painting of President riding out a storm at anchor

History

United States
- Name: USS President
- Namesake: President of the United States
- Ordered: 27 March 1794
- Builder: Initially Forman Cheesman; later Christian Bergh
- Cost: $220,910
- Laid down: 1798
- Launched: 10 April 1800
- Maiden voyage: 5 August 1800
- Captured: 15 January 1815
- Notes: First Commander: Thomas Truxtun

General characteristics
- Class & type: 44-gun Frigate
- Tonnage: 1,576 tons
- Length: 175 ft (53 m) between perpendiculars, at Keel:146 feet, 7 3/4 inches
- Beam: 44 ft 4 in (13.51 m) or 43 feet, 8 inches
- Depth of hold: 13 ft 11 in (4.24 m)
- Decks: Orlop, Berth, Gun, Spar
- Propulsion: Sail
- Complement: 400
- Armament: 32 × 24-pounder (10.9 kg) guns; 22 × 42-pounder (19 kg) carronades; 1 × 18-pounder (8 kg) long gun

United Kingdom
- Name: HMS President
- Acquired: 15 January 1815
- Fate: Broken up, 1818 (Note: American sources claim President was broken up in 1817, while British sources give 1818. In this instance, it is likely that British Admiralty records are more accurate, as the ship was in their possession.)

General characteristics
- Class & type: 50-gun; 60-gun (1817)
- Tons burthen: 1533 7/94 (bm)
- Length: 173 ft 3 in (52.8 m) (overall); 146 ft 4 3/4 in (44.6 m) (keel)
- Beam: 44 ft 4 in (13.5 m)
- Depth of hold: 13 ft 11 in (4.2 m)
- Armament: 30 × 24-pounder guns (10.9 kg); 28 × 42-pounder (19 kg) carronades; 2 × 24-pounder guns (10.9 kg)

USS President was a wooden-hulled, three-masted heavy frigate of the United States Navy, nominally rated at 44 guns; she was launched in April 1800 from a shipyard in New York City. President was one of the original six frigates whose construction the Naval Act of 1794 had authorized, and she was the last to be completed. The name "President" was among ten names submitted to President George Washington by Secretary of War Timothy Pickering in March of 1795 for the frigates that were to be constructed.

Joshua Humphreys designed the frigates to be the Navy's capital ships, and so President and her sister ships were larger and more heavily armed and built than standard frigates of the period. Forman Cheeseman, and later Christian Bergh, were in charge of her construction. Her first duties with the newly formed United States Navy were to provide protection for American merchant shipping during the Quasi War with France and to engage in a punitive expedition against the Barbary pirates in the First Barbary War.

On 16 May 1811, President was at the center of the Little Belt affair; her crew mistakenly identified HMS Little Belt as HMS Guerriere, which had impressed a sailor from an American brig. The ships exchanged cannon fire for several minutes. Subsequent American and British investigations placed responsibility for the attack on each other without a resolution. The incident contributed to tensions between the U.S. and Britain that led to the War of 1812.

During the war, President made several extended cruises, patrolling as far away as the English Channel and Norway; she captured the armed schooner HMS Highflyer and numerous merchant ships. In January 1815, after having been blockaded in New York for a year by the Royal Navy, President attempted to run the blockade, and was chased by a blockading squadron. During the chase, she was engaged and crippled by the frigate HMS Endymion off the coast of the city. The British squadron captured President soon after, and the Royal Navy took her into service as HMS President until she was broken up in 1818. President's design was copied and used to build the next HMS President in 1829.

== Design and construction ==
During the 1790s, American merchant vessels began to fall prey to Barbary pirates in the Mediterranean, most notably from Algiers. Congress's response was the Naval Act of 1794. The Act provided funds for the construction of six frigates; however, it included a clause stating that construction of the ships would cease if the United States agreed to peace terms with Algiers.

Joshua Humphreys' design was long on keel and narrow of beam (width) to allow for mounting very heavy guns. The design incorporated a diagonal scantling (rib) scheme to limit hogging (warping); the ships were given extremely heavy planking. This gave the hull greater strength than those of more lightly built frigates. Humphreys developed his design after realizing that the fledgling United States Navy could not match the navies of the European states for size. He therefore designed his frigates to be able to overpower other frigates, but with the speed to escape from a ship of the line.

George Washington named President in order to reflect a principle of the United States Constitution. In a report on progress of construction dated 12 December 1795 her keel had been completed, laid on the blocks and bolted together, and many parts received. Also noted that a large schooner carrying frame pieces along with other cargo had wrecked on Cape Hatteras on an unspecified date and was lost with all of her cargo. In March 1796 a peace accord was announced between the United States and Algiers. Construction was suspended in accordance with the Naval Act of 1794. At the onset of the Quasi-War with France in 1798, funds were approved to complete her construction, and her keel was laid at a shipyard in New York City. Her original naval constructor was Forman Cheeseman and the superintendent was Captain Silas Talbot.

Based on experience Humphreys gained during construction of President's sister ships, Constitution and United States, he instructed Cheeseman to make alterations to the frigate's design. These included raising the gun deck by 2 in (5.1 cm) and moving the main mast 2 ft (61 cm) further rearward. President was built to a length of 175 ft (53 m) between perpendiculars and a beam of 44.4 ft (13.5 m).

Although construction was begun at New York in the shipyard of Foreman Cheesman, work on her was discontinued in 1796. Construction resumed in 1798, under Christian Bergh and naval constructor William Doughty.

=== Armament ===
President's nominal rating was that of a 44-gun ship. However, she usually carried over 50 guns. and was pierced for 64. During her service in the War of 1812, President was armed with a battery of 55 guns: thirty-two 24-pounder (10.9 kg) cannon, twenty-two 42-pounder (19 kg) carronades, and one 18-pounder (8 kg) long gun.

During her Royal Navy service as HMS President, she was initially rated at 50 guns, although she was at this stage armed with 60 cannons—thirty 24-pounder guns (10.9 kg) on the upper deck, twenty-eight 42-pounder (19 kg) carronades on the spar deck, plus two more 24-pounder guns on the forecastle. In February 1817, she was again re-rated, this time to 60 guns.

Unlike modern Navy vessels, ships of this era had no permanent battery of guns. Guns were portable and were often exchanged between ships as situations warranted. Each commanding officer modified his vessel's armaments to his liking, taking into consideration factors such as the overall tonnage of cargo, complement of personnel aboard, and planned routes to be sailed. Consequently, a vessel's armament would change often during its career; permanent records of the changes were not generally kept.

== Quasi and First Barbary Wars ==
President launched on 10 April 1800—the last of the original six frigates to do so. After her fitting out, she departed for Guadeloupe on 5 August with Captain Thomas Truxtun in command. She departed Sandy Hook on 5 September. On 16 September she recaptured British ship "Ruth" from a French privateer (24°50′N 62°25′W) that had captured her the day before. On 16 October she detained and sent into St. Kitts schooner "Little George" without papers, but flying a Swedish flag, to determine ownership. She conducted routine patrols during the latter part of the Quasi-War and made several recaptures of American merchant ships. Nevertheless, her service in this period was uneventful. She returned to the United States sighting the Cape Henry Lighthouse on 16 February, and was in Hampton Roads on 17 February. after a peace treaty with France was ratified on 3 February 1801. During the Quasi-War, the United States paid tribute to the Barbary States to ensure that they would not seize or harass American merchant ships. In 1801 Yusuf Karamanli of Tripoli, dissatisfied with the amount of tribute in comparison to that paid to Algiers, demanded an immediate payment of $250,000. Thomas Jefferson responded by sending a squadron of warships to protect American merchant ships in the Mediterranean and to pursue peace with the Barbary States.

On 22 May 1801 Capt. Truxton turned over command to Capt. Richard Dale. In May, "Commodore" Richard Dale selected President as his flagship for the assignment in the Mediterranean. Dale's orders were to present a show of force off Algiers, Tripoli, and Tunis and maintain peace with promises of tribute. Dale was authorized to commence hostilities at his discretion if any Barbary State had declared war by the time of his arrival. Dale's squadron consisted of President, Philadelphia, Essex, and Enterprise. She sailed 1 June 1801 from Hampton Roads. The squadron arrived at Gibraltar on 1 July; President and Enterprise quickly continued to Algiers, where their presence convinced the regent to withdraw threats he had made against American merchant ships. President and Enterprise subsequently made appearances at Tunis and Tripoli before President arrived at Malta on 16 August to replenish drinking water supplies.

Blockading the harbor of Tripoli on 24 August, President captured a Greek vessel with Tripolitan soldiers aboard. Dale negotiated an exchange of prisoners that resulted in the release of several Americans held captive in Tripoli. President arrived at Gibraltar on 3 September. While anchored in Algeciras Bay on 22 October one of her boats was sent to Gibraltar, about 5 1/2 miles away, but capsized with all on board, except one, was lost. While leaving Mahón, under control of a Pilot, on 30 November, President struck a large rock while traveling at 6 knots (11 km/h; 6.9 mph). The impact brought Dale on deck and he successfully navigated President out of danger. An inspection at Toulon revealed that the impact had twisted off a 16–17 foot section of the forward part of her keel, the lower stem was gone, and other damages. Repairs were finished on 15 January 1802. President remained in the Mediterranean until 11 March 1802; She departed for the United States and arrived on 14 April and was placed "in ordinary".

Although President remained in the United States, operations against the Barbary States continued. A second squadron assembled under the command of Richard Valentine Morris in Chesapeake. Morris' poor performance resulted in his recall and subsequent dismissal from the Navy in 1803. A third squadron assembled under the command of Edward Preble in Constitution; by July 1804, they had fought the Battle of Tripoli Harbor.

=== Second Barbary patrol ===
On 21 March 1804 The Secretary of the Navy ordered Lt. Cassin, supervisor of the Washington Navy Yard, to prepare her for sea. She was recommissioned on 2 April. In April 1804, President Jefferson decided to reinforce Preble's squadron. President, Congress, Constellation, and Essex prepared to sail as soon as possible under the direction of Commodore Samuel Barron. Barron selected President as his flagship, but she required a new bowsprit and repairs to her masts and rigging. Some two months passed before the squadron was ready to sail. She left the Washington Navy Yard 25 May. She arrived at Hampton Roads on 13 June. They departed the Capes 5 July and arrived at Gibraltar on 12 August.

President left Gibraltar on 16 August with Constellation; the frigates paused at Malta before arriving off Tripoli on 10 September, joining Constitution, Argus, and Vixen. Sighting three ships running the blockade of Tripoli, the squadron moved in to capture them; during the pursuit, a sudden change in wind direction caused President to collide with Constitution. The collision caused serious damage to Constitution's stern, bow, and figurehead. Two of the captured ships were sent to Malta with Constitution; President sailed to Syracuse, Sicily, arriving on 27 August.

When Barron arrived in the Mediterranean, his seniority of rank over Preble entitled him to assume the duties of commodore. However, soon after replacing Preble, Barron went ashore at Syracuse in poor health and became bedridden. Under command of Captain George Cox, President began routine blockade duties of Tripoli during the winter months of 1804–05. In late April 1805, Constitution captured three ships off Tripoli. President escorted them to port at Malta before rejoining Constitution.

Barron's fragile health necessitated his resignation; he passed command to John Rodgers in late May 1805. Barron ordered Cox to command Essex, and turned President over to his brother, James Barron, on 29 May. On 3 June, after the Battle of Derne, the U.S. signed a peace treaty with Tripoli. President sailed for the United States on 13 July, carrying the ailing Barron, also Capt. Bainbridge and many sailors released from captivity in Tripoli. She arrived at Hampton Roads 11 September 1805 and was put in ordinary at the Washington Navy Yard on 22 September.

== Little Belt Affair ==
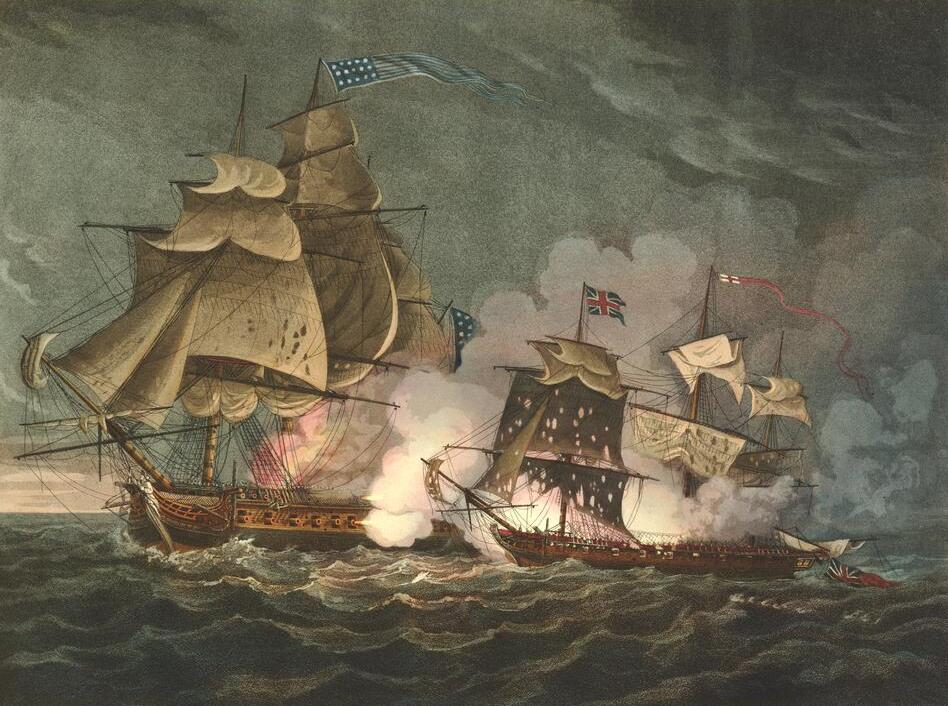
President fires on HMS Little Belt

In 1807, the Chesapeake-Leopard Affair heightened tensions between the United States and Britain. In preparation for further hostilities, Congress began authorizing naval appropriations, and President recommissioned in 1809 under the command of Commodore John Rodgers. She made routine and uneventful patrols, mainly along the United States' eastern seaboard, until 1 May 1811, when the British frigate HMS Guerriere stopped the American brig Spitfire 18 mi (29 km) from New York and impressed her apprentice sailing master, John Diggio. (Note: There was a U.S. Navy ship named Spitfire in service during this period, but sources are not clear if the Spitfire mentioned here was a U.S. Navy ship. This Spitfire is invariably described as "a merchant brig" or "American brig". The DANFS article on the U.S. Navy ship Spitfire makes no mention of the impressment incident, but the descriptions of both ships are very similar.)

Rodgers received orders to pursue Guerriere, and President sailed immediately from Fort Severn on 10 May. On 16 May, approximately 40 miles (64 km) northeast of Cape Henry, a lookout spotted a sail on the horizon. Closing to investigate, Rodgers determined the sail belonged to a warship, and raised signal flags to identify his ship. The unidentified ship, later learned to be HMS Little Belt—a 20-gun post ship—hoisted signal flags in return, but the hoist was not understood by President's crew. Little Belt sailed southward and Rodgers, believing the ship to be Guerriere, pursued.

Darkness set in before the ships were within hailing distance, and Rodgers hailed twice, only to have the same question returned to him: "What ship is that?" According to Rodgers, immediately after the exchange of hails, Little Belt fired a shot that tore through President's rigging. Rodgers returned fire. Little Belt promptly answered with three guns, and then a whole broadside. Rodgers ordered his gun crews to fire at will; several accurate broadsides heavily damaged Little Belt in return. After five minutes of firing, President's crew realized their adversary was much smaller than a frigate and Rodgers ordered a cease fire. However, Little Belt fired again and President answered with more broadsides. After Little Belt became silent, President stood off and waited overnight. At dawn it was obvious that Little Belt was greatly damaged from the fight; Rodgers sent a boat over from President to offer assistance in repairing the damage. Her captain, Arthur Bingham, acknowledged the damage; rejected the American offers of help, he sailed his ship to Halifax, Nova Scotia. President had one sailor slightly wounded in the exchange, while Little Belt suffered 31 killed or wounded.

Upon President's return to port, the U.S. Navy launched an investigation into the incident. Gathering testimony from President's officers and crewmen, they came to the conclusion that Little Belt had fired the first shot in the encounter. In the British investigation, Bingham instead claimed that President had fired the first shot and continued firing for 45 minutes, rather than the five minutes Rodgers claimed. In all subsequent reports, both captains continually insisted that the other ship had fired the first shot. Reaching a stalemate, the American and British governments quietly dropped the matter.

== War of 1812 ==
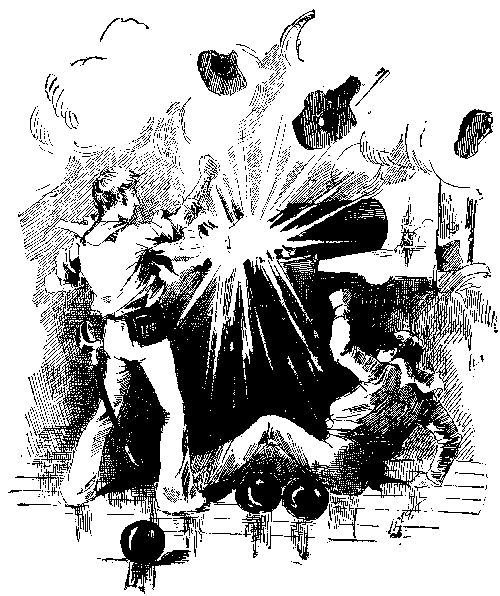
A cannon explodes during the pursuit of HMS Belvidera

The United States declared war against Britain on 18 June 1812. Three days later, within an hour of receiving official word of the declaration, Commodore Rodgers sailed from New York City. The commodore sailed aboard President, leading a squadron consisting of United States, Congress, Hornet, and Argus on a 70-day North Atlantic cruise. A passing American merchant ship informed Rodgers about a fleet of British merchantmen en route to Britain from Jamaica. Rodgers and his squadron sailed in pursuit, and on 23 June they encountered what was later learned to be HMS Belvidera. President pursued the ship, and in what is recorded as the first shot of the War of 1812, Rodgers himself aimed and fired a bowchaser at Belvidera, striking her rudder and penetrating the gun room. Upon President's fourth shot at Belvidera, a cannon one deck below Rodgers burst, killing or wounding 16 sailors and throwing Rodgers to the deck with enough force to break his leg.

The ensuing confusion allowed Belvidera to fire her stern chasers, killing six more men aboard President. Rodgers kept up the pursuit, using his bow chasers to severely damage Belvidera's rigging, but his two broadsides had little effect. The crew of Belvidera quickly made repairs to the rigging. They cut loose her anchors and boats and pumped drinking water overboard to lighten her load, thereby increasing her speed. Belvidera soon gained enough speed to distance herself from President, and Rodgers abandoned the pursuit. Belvidera sailed to Halifax to deliver the news that war had been declared.

President and her squadron returned to the pursuit of the Jamaican fleet, and on 1 July began to follow the trail of coconut shells and orange peels the Jamaicans had left behind them. President sailed to within one day's journey of the English Channel, but never sighted the convoy. Rodgers called off the pursuit on 13 July. During their return trip to Boston, Rodgers' squadron captured seven merchant ships and recaptured one American vessel.

After some refitting, President, still under Rodgers' command, sailed on 8 October with Congress, United States, and Argus. On 12 October, United States and Argus parted from the squadron for their own patrols. On 10 October, President chased HMS Nymphe, but failed to overtake her. On 17 October President captured the British packet ship Swallow, which carried a large amount of currency on board. On 31 October, President and Congress began pursuit of HMS Galatea, which was escorting two merchant ships. The chase lasted about three hours, and in that time Congress captured the merchant ship Argo. Meanwhile, President kept after Galatea and drew very close, but lost sight of her in the night. Congress and President remained together, but did not find any ships to capture during November. Returning to the United States, they passed north of Bermuda and proceeded toward the Virginia capes; they arrived in Boston on 31 December, having taken nine prizes. President and Congress found themselves blockaded there by the Royal Navy until April 1813.

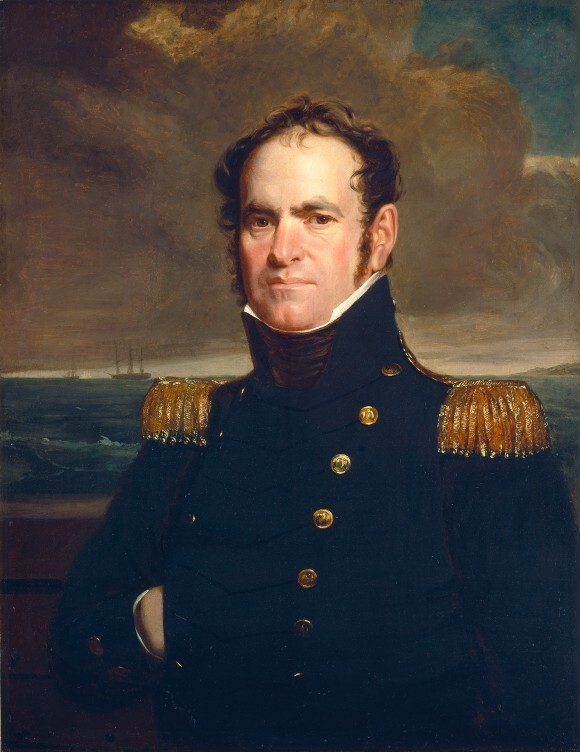
John Rodgers, ca. 1814

On 30 April, President and Congress sailed through the blockade on their third cruise of the war. On 2 May, they pursued HMS Curlew, but she outran them and escaped. President parted company with Congress on 8 May, and Rodgers set a course along the Gulf Stream to search for merchant ships to capture. By June, not having come across a single ship, President turned north; she put into North Bergen, Norway, on 27 June to replenish her drinking water. Sailing soon after, President captured two British merchant ships, which helped to replenish her stores. On 10 June President captured the outward-bound Falmouth packet Duke of Montrose, Captain Aaron Groub Blewett, which managed to throw her mails overboard before President could send a prize crew aboard. President made a cartel of Duke of Montrose, putting all of President's prisoners on board and then sending her into Falmouth under the command of an American officer. When Duke of Montrose arrived at Falmouth the British Government abrogated the cartel on the grounds that they had advised the American Government that the British would not recognize agreements entered into on the high seas.

Around the same time, two Royal Navy ships came into view. President set all sails to escape, and outran them in a chase lasting 80 hours. Rodgers reported that his decision to flee the ships was based on identifying them as a ship of the line and a frigate. Royal Navy records later revealed that the vessels were actually the 32-gun frigate Alexandria and the 16-gun fireship Spitfire.

Spending a few days near the Irish Channel, President captured several more merchant ships. She then set a course for the United States. In late September, she encountered HMS Highflyer along the east coast of the United States. Rodgers used his signal flags to trick Highflyer into believing that President was HMS Tenedos. Lieut. George Hutchinson, Highflyer's captain, came aboard President only to discover he had walked into a trap; President captured Highflyer without a shot being fired. President's long cruise netted her 11 merchant ships, in addition to Highflyer.

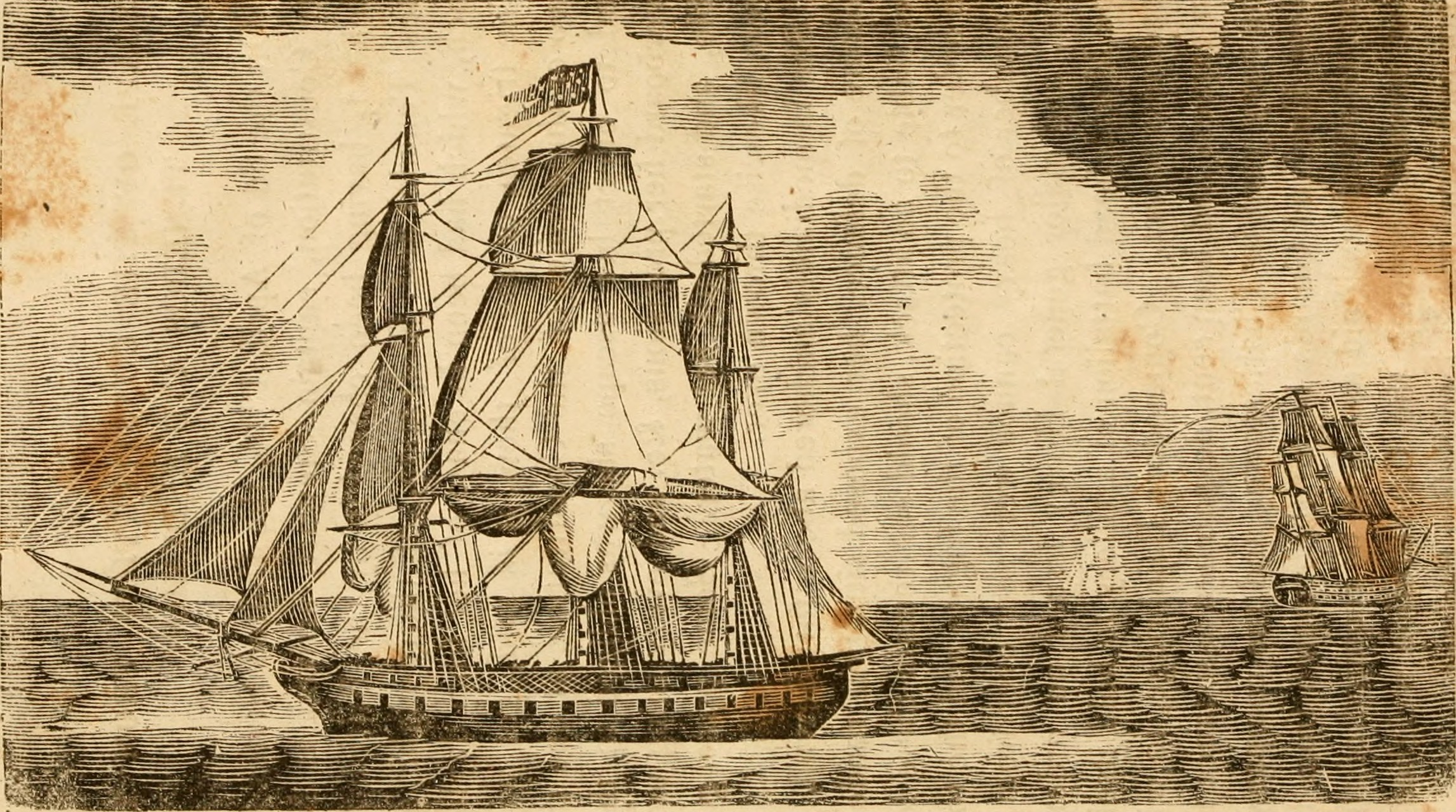
President and HMS Plantagenet February 1814

On 4 December 1813, President sailed from Providence, Rhode Island. On the 25th, she encountered two frigates in the dark, one of which fired at her. Rodgers believed the ships to be British, but they were two French frigates, Méduse and Nymphe. Afterward, Rodgers headed toward Barbados for an eight-week cruise in the West Indies, reportedly making three small captures, among them the British merchant ships Wanderer, which she captured on 4 January 1814 in the Atlantic Ocean at approximately 13°N 51°W and sank, and Edward, which she captured and sank on 9 January. Returning to New York City on 18 February 1814, President encountered HMS Loire, which turned to escape once the latter's crew realized President was a 44-gun frigate. President remained in New York for the duration of 1814 due to the harbor's blockade by a British squadron consisting of HMS Endymion, Majestic, Pomone, and Tenedos.

=== Capture ===
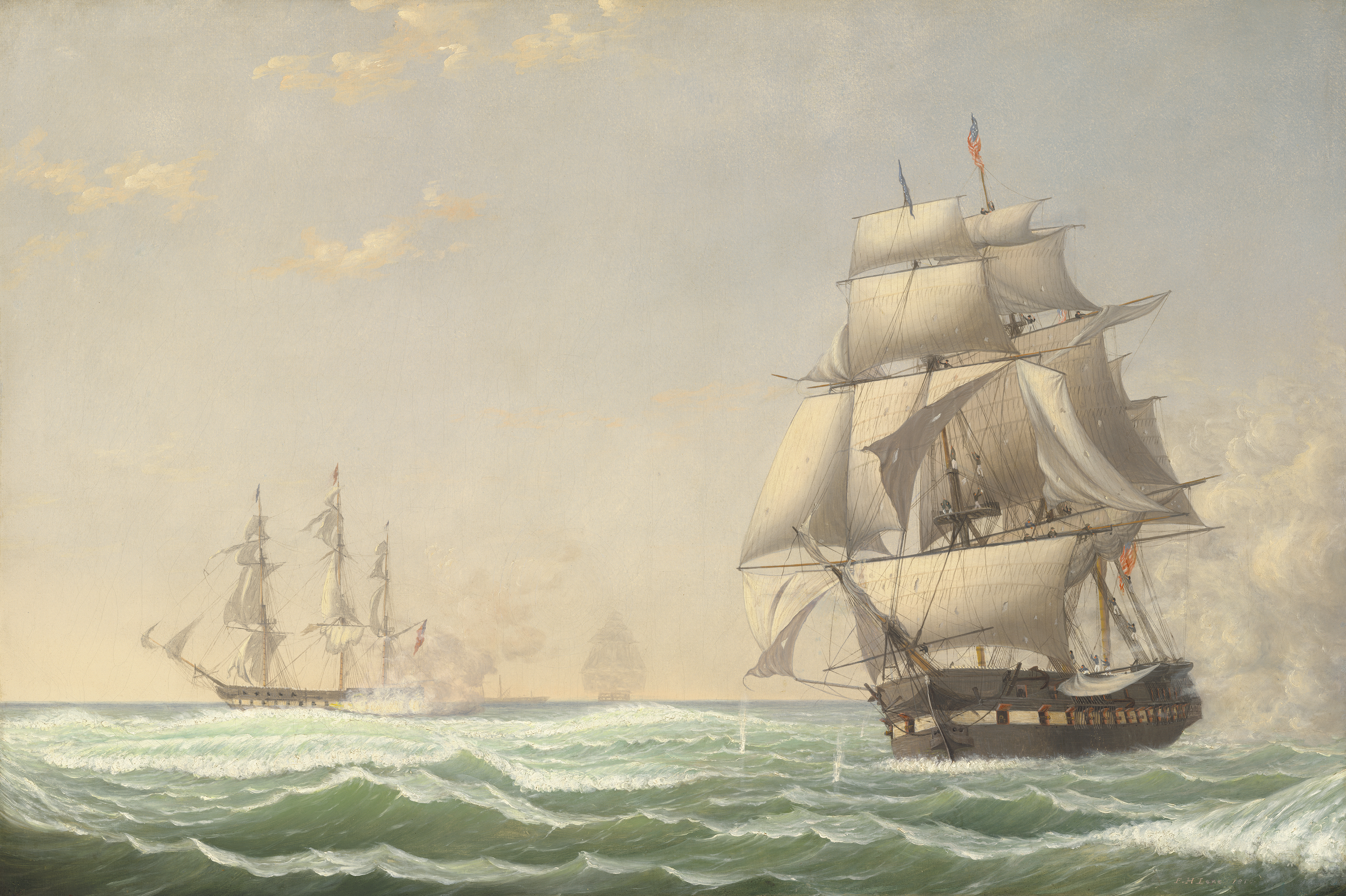
The United States Frigate "President" Engaging the British Squadron, 1815 (Fitz Henry Lane, 1850)

Stephen Decatur assumed command of President in December 1814, planning a cruise to the West Indies to prey on British shipping. In mid-January 1815, a snowy gale with strong winds forced the British blockading squadron away from New York Harbor, giving Decatur the opportunity to put to sea. On the evening of 14 January, President headed out of the harbor but ran aground, the result of harbor pilots incorrectly marking a safe passage. Stranded on the sand bar, President lifted and dropped with the incoming tide. Within two hours her hull had been damaged, her timbers twisted, and masts sprung. Damage to her keel caused the ship to hog and sag. Decatur was finally able to float President off the bar and, assessing the damage, he decided to return to New York for repairs; however, the wind direction was not favorable and President was forced to head out to sea.

Unaware of the exact location of the blockading squadron, Decatur set a course to avoid them and seek a safe port, but approximately two hours later the squadron's sails were spotted on the horizon. President changed course to outrun them, but the damage she suffered the night before had significantly reduced her speed. Attempting to gain speed, Decatur ordered expendable cargo thrown overboard; by late afternoon of 15 January, HMS Endymion under Captain Henry Hope came alongside and proceeded to fire broadsides. Decatur planned to bring President in close to Endymion, whereby President's crew could board and capture the opposing ship and sail her to New York. (President would be scuttled to prevent her capture).

Making several attempts to close on Endymion, Decatur discovered that President's damage limited her maneuverability, allowing Endymion to anticipate, and draw away from, positions favorable for boarding. Faced with this new dilemma, Decatur ordered bar and chain shot fired to disable Endymion's sails and rigging, the idea being to shake his pursuer and allow President to proceed to a safe port without being followed. At noon, Endymion, being the much better sailer, was close-hauled, outpacing her squadron and leaving them behind. At 2 pm, she gained on President and took position on the American ship's quarter, shooting into President as she tried to escape. Endymion was able to rake President three times and did considerable damage to her; by contrast, President primarily directed her fire at Endymion's rigging in order to slow her down during the two-hour engagement.

Finally at 7:58 pm, President ceased fire and hoisted a light in her rigging, indicating that she had surrendered. Endymion ceased firing on the defeated American ship but did not board to take possession of her prize, due to a lack of undamaged boats. Endymion's foresails had been damaged in the engagement and while she hove to for repairs, Decatur took advantage of the situation and, despite having struck, made off to escape at 8:30 pm; Endymion, hastily completed repairs and resumed the chase at 8:52 pm. President drew away while her crew made hurried repairs of their own. Within two hours, one of her lookouts spotted the remainder of the British squadron drawing near. President continued her escape attempt, but by nightfall HMS Pomone and Tenedos had caught up and began firing broadsides. Realizing his situation, Decatur surrendered President again, just before midnight.

== As HMS President ==
Now in possession of the Royal Navy, President and her crew were ordered to proceed to Bermuda with Endymion. During the journey, they encountered a dangerous gale. The storm destroyed President's masts and strained her timbers so badly that all the upper-deck guns were thrown overboard to prevent her from sinking. The cartel Clarendon, Garness, master, brought 400 prisoners from President from Bermuda back to New York. On 7 April 1815 Clarendon grounded at Sandy Hook but crew, passengers, and prisoners were all saved.

Upon the prisoners' return to the United States, a U.S. Navy court martial board acquitted Decatur, his officers, and his men of any wrongdoing in the surrender of President.

President and Endymion continued to England, arriving at Spithead on 28 March. President was commissioned into the Royal Navy under the name HMS President. Her initial rating was set at 50 guns, although she was at this stage armed with 60 cannons—thirty 24-pounders (10.9 kg) on the upper deck, twenty-eight 42-pounder (19 kg) carronades on the spar deck, plus two more 24-pounder guns on the forecastle. In February 1817 she was again re-rated, this time to 60 guns.

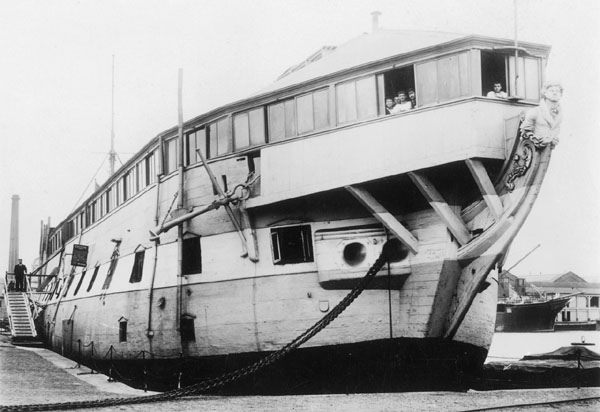
1829 HMS President in South West India Dock, London, ca. 1880; broken up in 1903

In March 1818 she was considered for refitting. A drydock inspection revealed that the majority of her timber was defective or rotten and she was broken up at Portsmouth in June. President's design was copied and used to build HMS President in 1829, although this was reportedly more of a political maneuver than a testament to the design: the Royal Navy wished to retain the name and likeness of the American ship on their register as a reminder to the United States and other nations of the capture.
