= HMS Guerriere (1806) =

Frigate of the French (later British) Navy, in service from 1800 to 1812

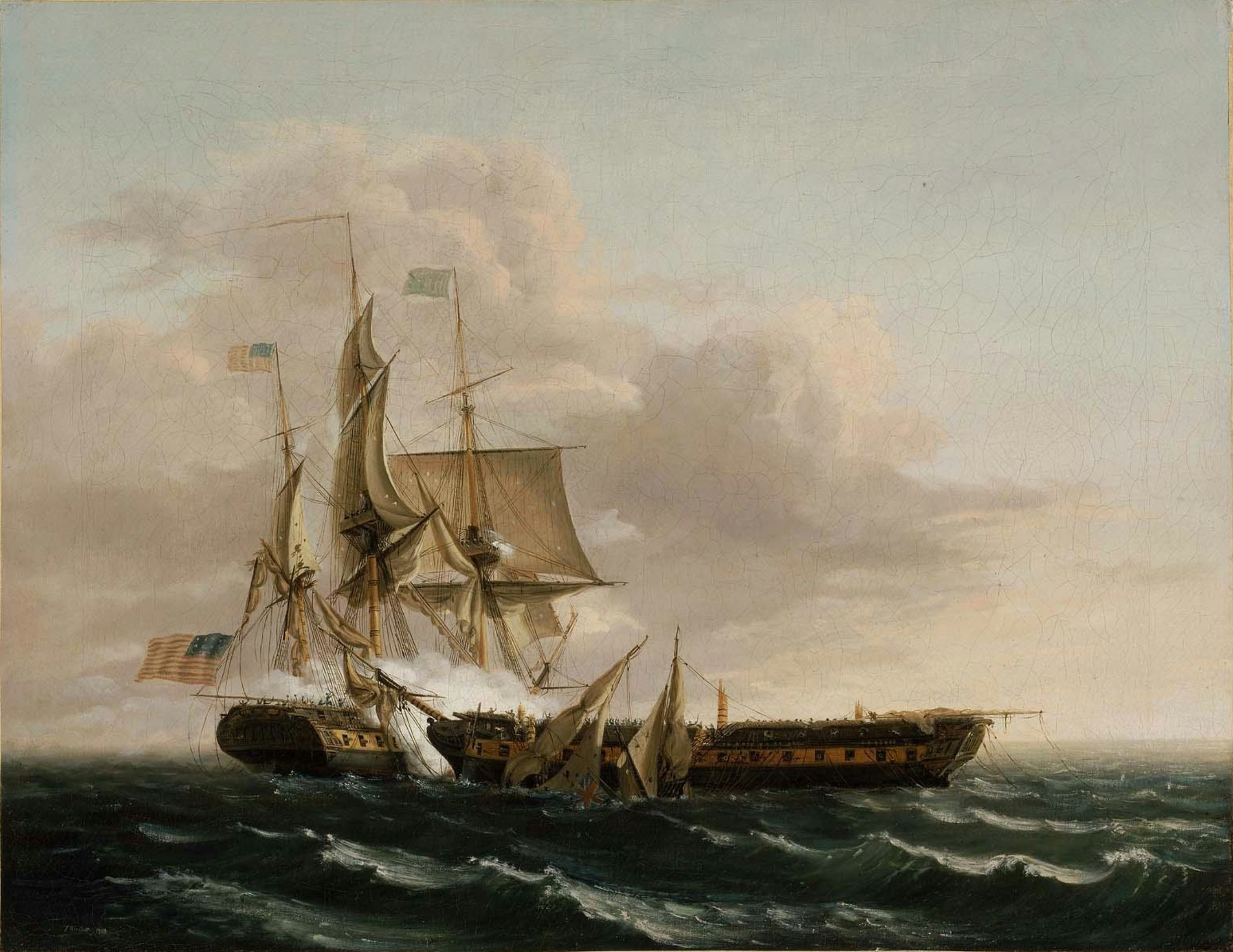
- Guerriere (right) fighting against the USS Constitution

History

France
- Name: Guerrière
- Namesake: "Warrior"
- Laid down: 22 September 1796
- Launched: 15 September 1799
- Commissioned: May 1800
- Captured: 19 July 1806

United Kingdom
- Name: HMS Guerriere
- Acquired: Captured from the French on 19 July 1806
- Fate: Captured and burned by the crew of USS Constitution on 19 August 1812

General characteristics
- Class & type: fifth-rate frigate
- Tons burthen: 1,092 tons
- Length: 47.1 metres
- Beam: 12 metres
- Draught: 5.8 metres
- Propulsion: Sails
- Complement: 350
- Armament: Rated as 38 guns: 16 × 32-pounder carronades; 30 × 18-pounder long guns; 2 × 12-pounder long guns; 1 × 18-pdr carronade

Guerrière was a 38-gun frigate of the French Navy, designed by Forfait. The British captured her and recommissioned her as HMS Guerriere. She is most famous for her fight against USS Constitution.

Her career with the French included a sortie with Duguay-Trouin in 1803, in which the two vessels were forced to make an escape from a British ship. They were harried by British forces of varying strengths during their journey back to port and only just reached the safety of Corunna, with Guerrière being engaged by the 74-gun HMS Culloden until she reached the entrance to the port. She sailed in 1806 with several other French ships to attack British and Russian whalers, but was chased and brought to action by HMS Blanche. After a hard-fought battle, Blanche forced Guerrière to surrender, and brought her back to Britain.

Now commissioned as HMS Guerriere, she went out to the West Indies and served off the American coast for a number of years. She captured a number of privateers, and was still in American waters after the outbreak of the War of 1812. On 19 August 1812 Guerriere, under Captain James Richard Dacres, sighted the American frigate Constitution, under Isaac Hull. The two ships closed and after a fierce engagement the American managed to shoot away Guerriere's fore and main-masts, leaving her un-manoeuvrable. Dacres struck his colours to avoid further bloodshed; the Americans then transferred her crew to Constitution and set fire to the badly damaged Guerriere.

== Career with the French ==
=== Sailing with Duguay-Trouin ===
Guerrière served with the French Navy during the Napoleonic Wars under Commander Louis Alexis Baudoin, initially trapped in harbour by the Blockade of Saint-Domingue. She was with the 74-gun Duguay-Trouin on 24 July 1803, when the latter ship was spotted by a British ship off Cape Picolet. The 74-gun HMS Elephant, under Captain George Dundas gave chase, and the two ships exchanged several broadsides. The 18-gun sloop HMS Snake appeared on the north-west quarter, but the Elephant, either because of the appearance of Guerrière to windward, or for another unexplained reason, failed to maintain her position alongside Duguay-Trouin. Consequently, both French ships were able to escape. However, Duquesne, a 74-gun armed en flûte (removing some or all of her armament), was captured.

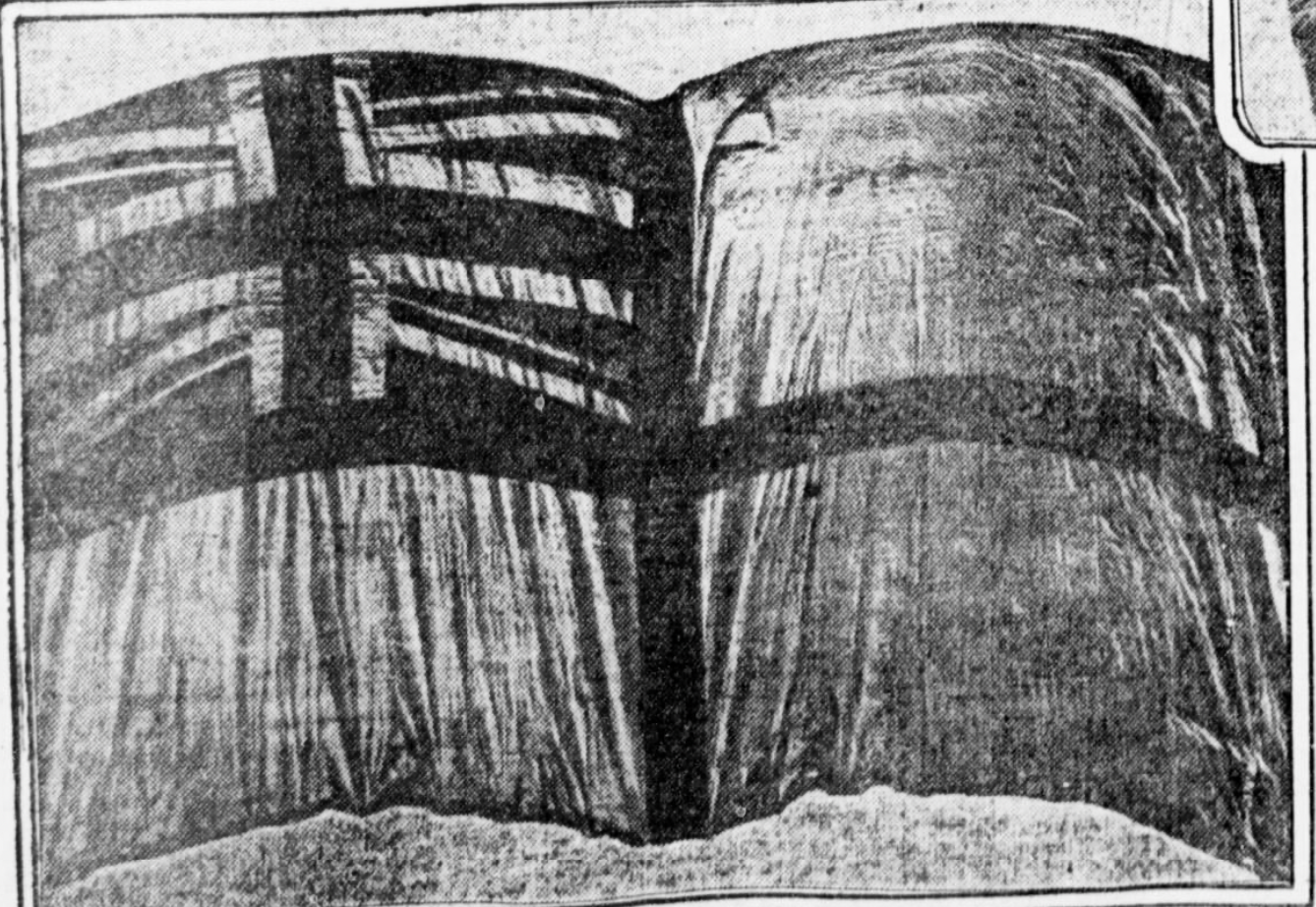
Ship's flag

Duguay-Trouin and Guerrière made for the European coast, eventually making the port of Ferrol in Spain. On 29 August they were spotted by the 38-gun frigate HMS Boadicea, under the command of Captain John Maitland. Unable to make out what the unknown ships he had sighted were, he gave chase. Before nightfall he had discerned that the ships were enemies, but heavy fog made it impossible to determine their disposition until just after midday on 31 August, when it became clear that one of them was a 74 gunner and together, they were more than a match for Boadicea. He nevertheless continued to close and tested the Frenchmen's resolve with a broadside. After an ineffectual but vocal reply had revealed to him that the French ships were fully manned and armed, Maitland brought his ship about and began to escape. The French attempted to pursue but were unable to catch Boadicea, eventually returning to their original course.

The two ships arrived off Cape Prior on 2 September, when they were again spotted, this time by a British squadron under the command of Commodore Sir Edward Pellew. The only ship ready and able to pursue the French was HMS Culloden, under the command of Captain Barrington Dacres. He immediately began a pursuit and after a chase, managed to close the French and open fire. Duguay-Trouin, being the weathermost ship, got into Corunna first. The forts defending the port opened fire on Culloden, but she continued to engage Guerrière, until almost within the port, at which point she hauled off and returned to the squadron. Culloden suffered four men wounded, whilst Guerrière had suffered considerable damage to her masts and rigging and had lost six men killed and 15, including her captain and first lieutenant, wounded.

=== Battling HMS Blanche ===
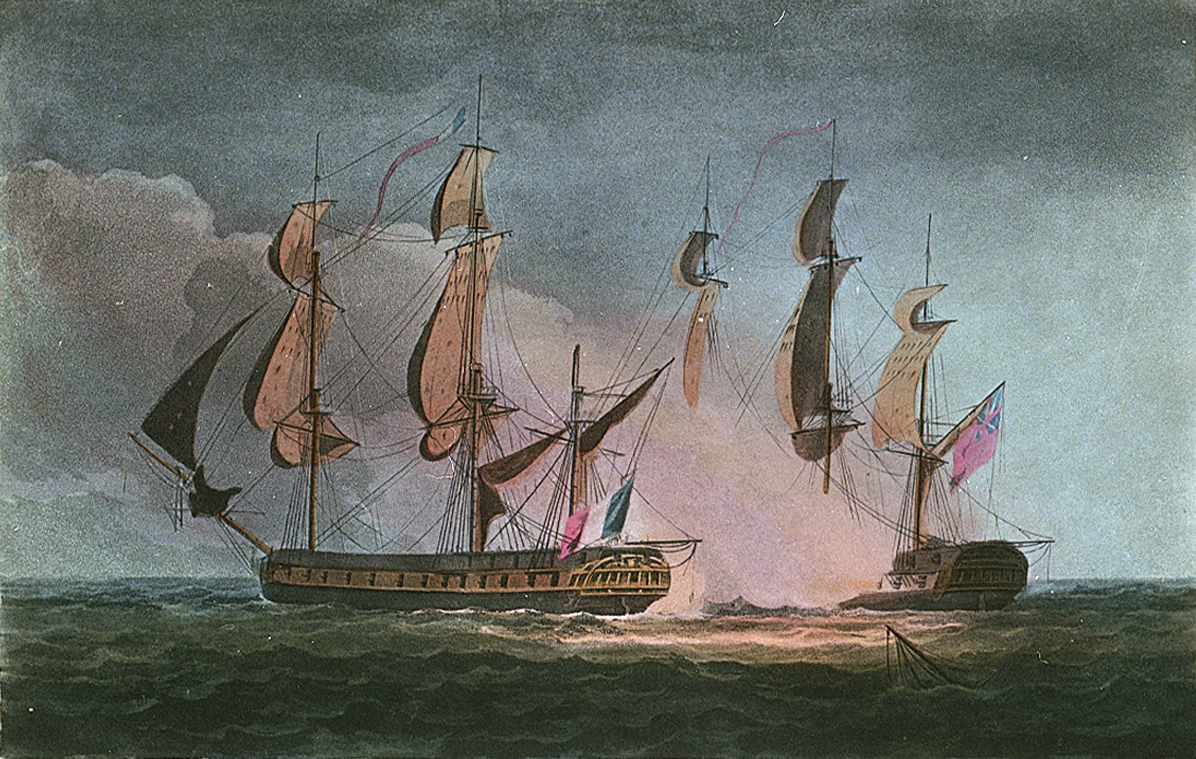
HMS Blanche capturing Guerrière on 18 July 1806

Guerrière was despatched from Lorient on 28 March 1806 in company with the frigates Revanche and Sirène, and the brig-corvette Néarque, with orders to attack and destroy British and Russian whalers in the Arctic, off Greenland. She became separated from the rest of the squadron, but was able to capture and burn several whaling vessels. By 16 July, news of her activities, including a recent sighting off the Faroe Islands reached Captain Thomas Lavie aboard the frigate HMS Blanche, then off the Shetland Islands. Blanche quickly sailed to the reported area and on 18 July, sighted Guerrière. At this point Guerrière was carrying 50 guns, to Blanche's 46.

Blanche quickly closed the distance, but Guerrière, perhaps mistaking the British frigate for one of her squadron, did not initially take action. Blanche opened fire at about 15 minutes past midnight, firing two broadsides before Guerrière could respond. A fierce fight followed, with Guerrière eventually surrendering at half past one that morning, having lost her mizzenmast. Blanche had suffered light damage and four men wounded out of her complement of 265. Guerrière had suffered considerable damage to her lower masts, as well as to her hull, both above and below the waterline. Out of her complement of 350, 20 of her officers, seamen and marines had been killed, whilst another 30 were wounded, ten of them seriously. Many of the French crew had been ill below decks during the engagement. Guerrière had been aiming to cripple Blanche by firing to bring down her masts, so that Guerrière might escape. When this failed, Guerrière was eventually worn down and forced to strike.

Blanche escorted Guerrière back to Britain, arriving with her prize on 26 July in Yarmouth Roads. Guerrière was commissioned into the Royal Navy, after a repair and refit which brought her to 48 guns. The captain of Blanche was knighted and the first lieutenant was promoted.

== As HMS Guerriere ==
Guerriere spent 1807 fitting out at Chatham Dockyard, and entered active duty in 1808 under the command of Captain Alexander Skene. She was based in Jamaica and on 15 February she captured the French privateer brig Malvina, of Nantes. Malvina was commanded by René Salaun and carried 14 guns and 60 men. She had been travelling with her prize, the British ship Juliana, which Guerriere recaptured.

In July 1808, the master of an American brig claimed the protection of a convoy from Jamaica, which was being escorted by the 64-gun HMS Veteran. The American traveled with the convoy for part of its journey, but twenty four hours after leaving its protection, he betrayed the strength and course of the convoy to the French. The French privateer cutter Peraty, under the command of M. Maurison, took up position in the convoy's path, hoping to capture some of the ships. Guerrière surprised and captured the privateer after a chase lasting 24 hours. The privateer was found to be the former HMS Barbara, which the French privateer General Ernouf had captured on 17 September 1807. The prize crew had sailed Barbara to Charlestown, where she had been refitted. As Peraty, she had sailed again on 10 September, having been furnished with supplies and provisions for three months of raiding. Peraty was armed with twelve 18-pounder carronades and had a crew of 80 men.

In 1809 Guerriere was under the command of Captain Robert Lloyd, formerly of HMS Hussar. He was replaced in 1810 by Captain Samuel John Pechell, and in October that year, Guerriere sailed to Halifax.

On 1 May 1811 Guerriere stopped the brig USS Spitfire off New Jersey's Sandy Hook, impressing the apprentice sailing master of Spitfire (and citizen of Maine), John Diggio. Fifteen days later, the frigate USS President mistook the sixth-rate HMS Little Belt for Guerriere and attempted to recover Diggio, leading to the Little Belt affair. The incident provoked a diplomatic furor and contributed to the tense atmosphere prior to the War of 1812. Pechell stayed with Guerriere until July 1811, when he returned to his previous ship, HMS Cleopatra. He was replaced by Captain James Dacres, and she sailed for the Halifax Station. In August 1811 she detained the American brig New Orleans Packet.

=== Fighting USS Constitution ===
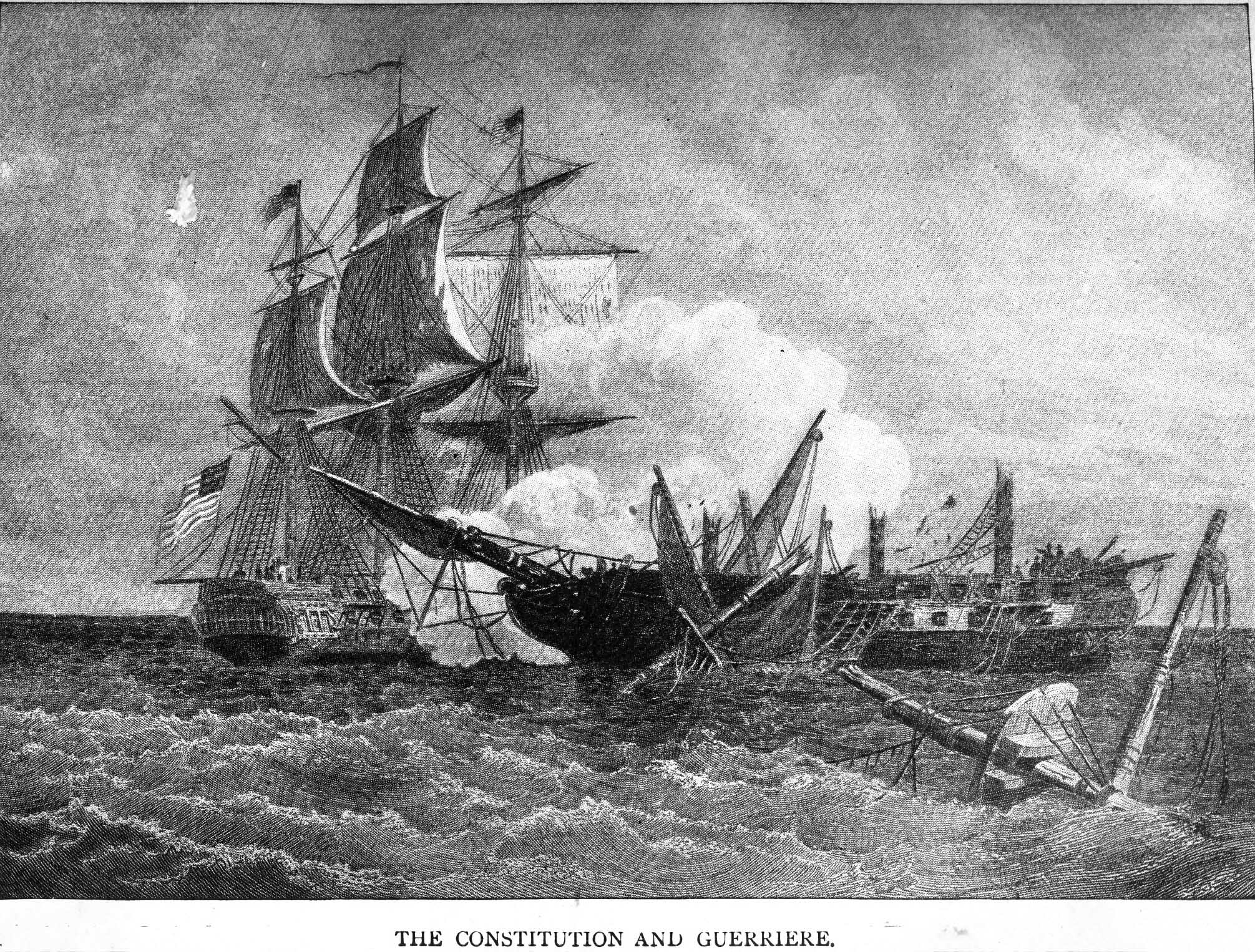
Constitution and the defeated Guerriere.

During the afternoon of 19 August 1812, 41°42′N 55°33′W about 400 miles (640 km) southeast of Halifax, Nova Scotia, a sail was sighted on the weather beam bearing down on them. She was soon made out to be a man-of-war and Guerriere prepared for action, mustering 244 men and 19 boys at quarters. When the enemy hoisted American colours, Captain Dacres permitted the Americans in his crew to quit their guns.

The two ships exchanged broadsides for half an hour before the American ship closed her starboard beam and sent HMS Guerriere's mizzenmast overboard. Switching to the other bow, the American ship raked HMS Guerriere, which included sweeping her decks with grapeshot and musket fire, and then attempted to board. Samuel Grant, master's mate commanding the forecastle, was badly wounded and at about the same time Robert Scott, the master, was shot through the knee and the Captain severely wounded. Captain Dacres ordered Lieutenant Bartholomew Kent to lead the marines and boarders from the main deck towards the forecastle, but the two ships parting at that moment meant that they were able to bring some of the bow guns to bear on the Constitution. William J. Snow, master's mate, commanded the fore-most main deck guns and John Garby, acting purser, the after quarterdeck guns.

The two ships were clear of each other when Guerriere's foremast and mainmast went over the side, leaving her an unmanageable wreck. The crew managed to clear the debris, but while they were rolling enough to put the main deck guns under water, the American ship came within pistol range to rake them. At this point, Captain Dacres called his remaining officers together and they agreed to strike the colours to avoid further loss of life. Fifteen men had been killed, including the second lieutenant, Mr. Henry Ready; six were mortally wounded, 39 severely and eighteen slightly. Lieutenant Kent was wounded by a splinter early on.

They found that the enemy was the heavy frigate USS Constitution under Captain Isaac Hull armed with thirty 24-pounders on the main deck, twenty-four 32-pounders and two bored-out 18-pounders on the upper deck. Out of 476 men, nine were killed and thirteen were wounded. Captain Dacres was surprised and shocked to find a large proportion of British seamen amongst her crew, a number of whom had joined in the boarding party.

Hull wanted to take Guerriere as a prize but by the next morning it was clear that the ship was too badly damaged to salvage. The next day, she was set on fire by her captors; Constitution returned to Boston, Massachusetts. Dacres wrote a report of the action to the commander of the North American Station, Vice-Admiral Herbert Sawyer. A court-martial was held on board HMS Africa at Halifax on 2 October. It found that Captain Dacres was justified in surrendering his ship to save the lives of his remaining crew. The court also found that the masts going overboard was due more to their defective nature than the fire of the enemy. Captain Dacres was later given command of the 38-gun fifth rate HMS Tiber.

Part of Guerriere's crew returned to Plymouth on 16 January 1813 aboard HMS Spy. The French had captured and released Spy on 20 December 1812.
