= William Bingham (priest) =

Anglican priest and Archdeacon of London

William Bingham (1743–1819) was Archdeacon of London from 1789 to 1813.

== Biography ==
Bingham was born in Melcombe Bingham and educated at Brasenose College, Oxford. He was Vicar of Great Gaddesden from 1777 until 1819; and Rector of Hemel Hempstead from 1778. In 1792 he was appointed an Honorary Chaplain to the King.

== Family ==
Bingham married Agnata Dörrien in 1775: they had four children, one of whom, Arthur, was a distinguished officer in the Royal Navy.

Church of England titles
Preceded by Richard Beadon	Archdeacon of London; 1789–1813	Succeeded by Joseph Pott
