= USS Constellation vs L'Insurgente =

1799 naval action between the U.S. and France

- Part of the Quasi-War
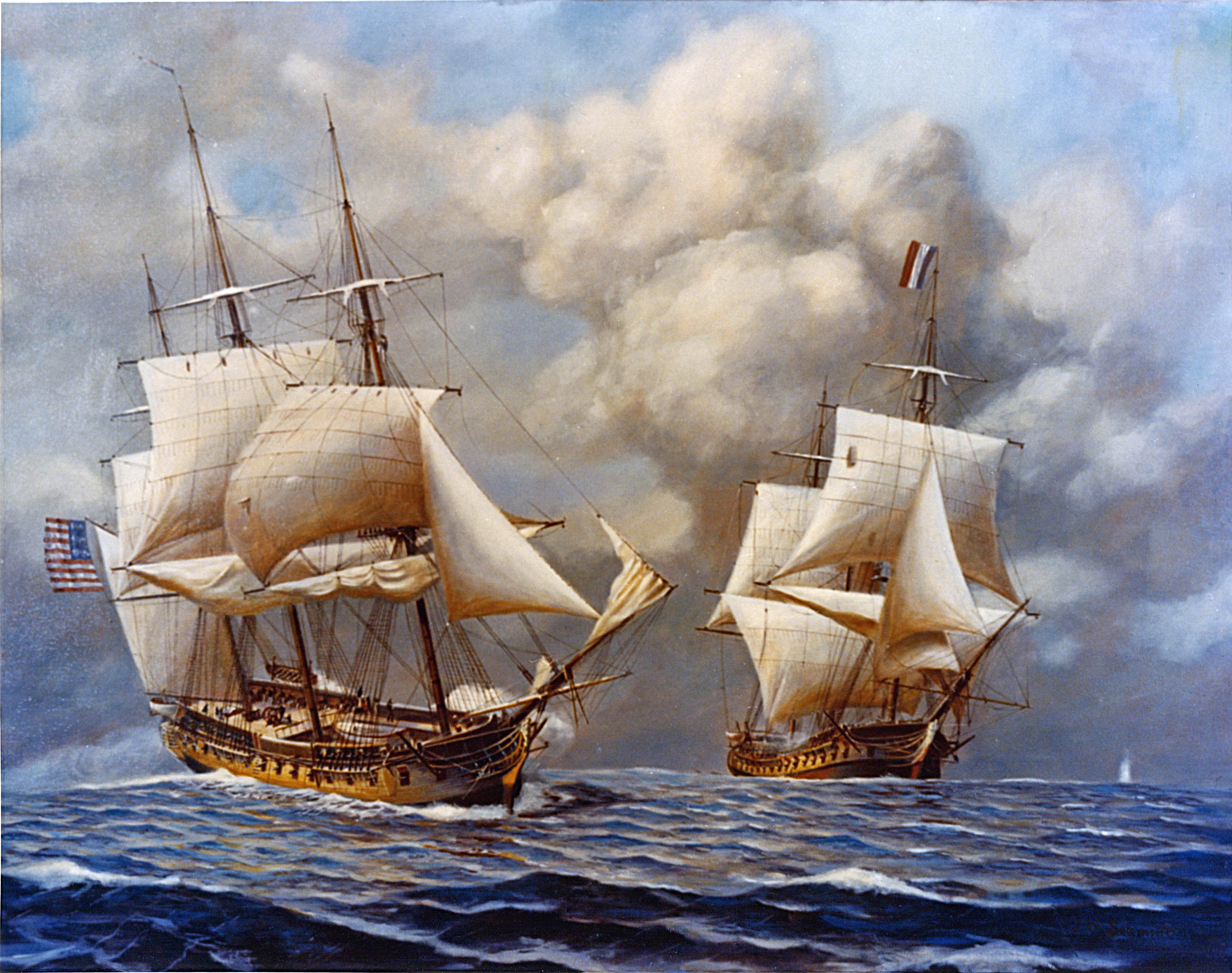
- Action of 9 February 1799, John William Schmidt
Date	9 February 1799
Location	Off Nevis in the Caribbean Sea
Result	American victory

Belligerents
United States	France

Commanders and leaders
Thomas Truxtun	(France) Michel-Pierre Barreaut (surrendered)

Strength
1 frigate	1 frigate

Casualties and losses
2 killed 2 wounded	1 frigate captured 29 killed 41 wounded

USS Constellation vs L'Insurgente, or the action of 9 February 1799, was a single-ship action fought between frigates of the French Navy and the United States Navy during the Quasi-War, an undeclared war that lasted from 1798 to 1800. The battle resulted in USS Constellation's capture of L'Insurgente, after an intense firefight in which both sides exchanged heavy broadsides and musket fire.

French privateering attacks against American vessels, begun a year prior, caused the conflict between the United States and France. An American squadron under Commodore Thomas Truxtun had been sent to patrol the Caribbean waters between Puerto Rico and Saint Kitts with orders to engage any French forces they found in the area. While Truxtun was sailing independently of his squadron in Constellation, his flagship, he met and engaged L'Insurgente. After chasing the French ship through a storm, Constellation forced L'Insurgente into an engagement that lasted an hour and fourteen minutes before the French frigate surrendered. The French sustained heavy casualties in the action, while the numbers of American dead and wounded were low.

After the action, L'Insurgente was taken to Saint Kitts and commissioned into the United States Navy as USS Insurgent. With this and later victories, American morale soared, and Truxtun returned home to honor and praise from the American government and the public at large.

== Background ==
In 1798, an undeclared war between the United States and France began due to French privateering attacks against American vessels. These attacks were sanctioned due to the failure of the United States to repay its considerable debts to France, incurred during the American War of Independence. In response to the attacks, the United States government decided to go on the offensive by sending four naval squadrons to the Caribbean with orders to seize armed French vessels and prevent privateers from attacking American ships. One of the squadrons, under the command of Commodore Thomas Truxtun, was dispatched to cruise between Puerto Rico and Saint Kitts. Truxtun's squadron consisted of his flagship, the frigate USS Constellation, the 20-gun Baltimore, the brigs Richmond and Norfolk, and the revenue cutter Virginia. Opposing Truxtun were several French vessels based in Guadeloupe, among them a number of privateers as well as two French naval frigates and a smaller, 20-gun corvette. One of the French frigates, L'Insurgente, sortied from Guadeloupe on 8 February, commanded by Michel-Pierre Barreaut.

Though the 1,265-ton Constellation was officially classified by the United States Navy as a 36-gun frigate, during the Quasi-War she carried a heavier armament of 38 guns. (Note: It was commonplace for American naval ships during the Quasi-War to carry more guns than the number in their official rating.) Consisting of twenty-eight 24-pounders on her main deck and ten 12-pounders on her spar deck, Constellation's main armament had a combined throwing weight of 396 pounds (180 kg). (Note: Some sources state that Constellation carried 48 guns, with twenty rather than ten 12-pounders.) In contrast, L'Insurgente, rated a 32-gun Sémillante-class frigate, was armed with 40 cannons. The armament of Barreaut's 950-ton ship consisted of twenty-four 12-pounders, two 18-pounders, eight 6-pounders, four 32-pounder carronades, and two 24-pounder carronades, totalling a combined throwing weight of only 282 pounds (128 kg). Thus, although Barreaut's vessel carried two more guns in total, Truxtun's frigate had a more powerful armament due to shot weight. In a boarding action, the French frigate's crew of 409 men would have had an advantage over the American ship's 309, but in a gunnery duel the Americans were superior.

== Battle ==
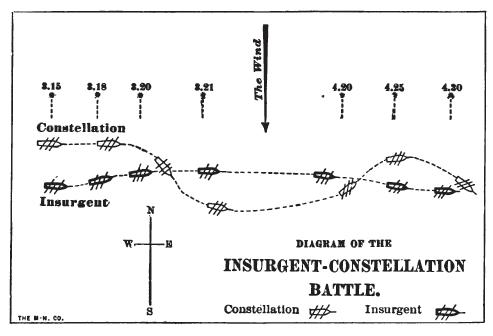
A diagram of Constellation's engagement with L'Insurgente

At noon on 9 February, while cruising independently, Truxtun's men sighted a frigate off the coast of Nevis. Upon approach it was evident that the vessel was flying American colors, and Constellation attempted to move closer to investigate. Unknown to Truxtun, the frigate was the French L'Insurgente under Michel-Pierre Barreaut. Nearing the still-unidentified L'Insurgente, Truxtun attempted to signal her to discern her nationality by displaying first British signals and then American signals. Not knowing the correct reply, L'Insurgente replaced the American colors with French and fired a gun. (Note: Truxtun claimed L'Insurgente's shot was fired windward to signal a fight, while Barreaut claimed he ordered the shot fired to leeward to signal that he wished to communicate.) Upon sighting Constellation at 12:30 pm, Barreaut mistook the ship for a British corvette and began to flee toward the Dutch islands of Saba and Sint Eustatius to evade his assailant. Truxtun gave chase, but was hampered at 1:30 p.m. when the two vessels ran into a gale. As a result of the storm, L'Insurgente lost her main topmast and was severely damaged, while Constellation managed to avoid significant damage and was able to close in on Barreaut.

Though Truxtun's ship initially held an advantageous position in the wind known as the weather gauge, she was over-armed, and as a result her leeward side heeled so much that the gunports on that side of the vessel could not be opened. Truxtun decided to cede the weather gauge to the French by sailing around L'Insurgente's leeward side and bringing Constellation near the French frigate's port side. In such a position Constellation was disadvantaged by the wind, but was able to avoid some of the heeling effect on her guns. With Constellation approaching his frigate fast, Barreaut tried to communicate with the Americans in order to avoid a fight. The American frigate ignored the French attempt at hailing her and closed to within fifty yards of L'Insurgente before opening up on her with a broadside. The double-shotted American salvo severely damaged the French frigate's quarterdeck. Barreaut's vessel replied with her own broadsides that damaged Constellation's fore topmast. Midshipman David Porter, stationed in the rigging of Constellation's damaged mast, managed to relieve pressure from it and prevented its collapse. L'Insurgente attempted to close on the American frigate to board her. With less damage to her rigging, Constellation was easily able to avoid Barreaut's attempts at boarding.

Constellation crossed L'Insurgente's bow and raked her with a broadside. Truxtun then maneuvered Constellation to L'Insurgente's starboard side and fired further broadsides into the French frigate, but received damage to her rigging in return. Constellation slipped ahead of L'Insurgente, again crossing her bow and raking her. Once more Constellation slipped next to L'Insurgente's leeward side and fired into her, disabling the French vessel's 18-pounder guns. Constellation crossed the frigate's bow a third time, but the French ship had by then sustained massive damage. Attempts by Barreaut's crew to repair L'Insurgente's rigging were fruitless and the French captain struck his colors to surrender the vessel. The engagement had lasted 74 minutes.

== Aftermath ==
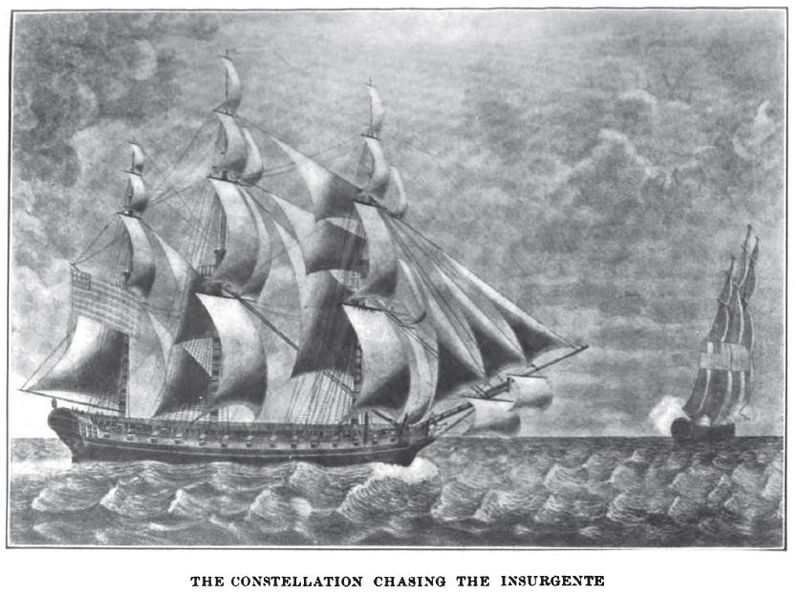
USS Constellation chasing L'Insurgente

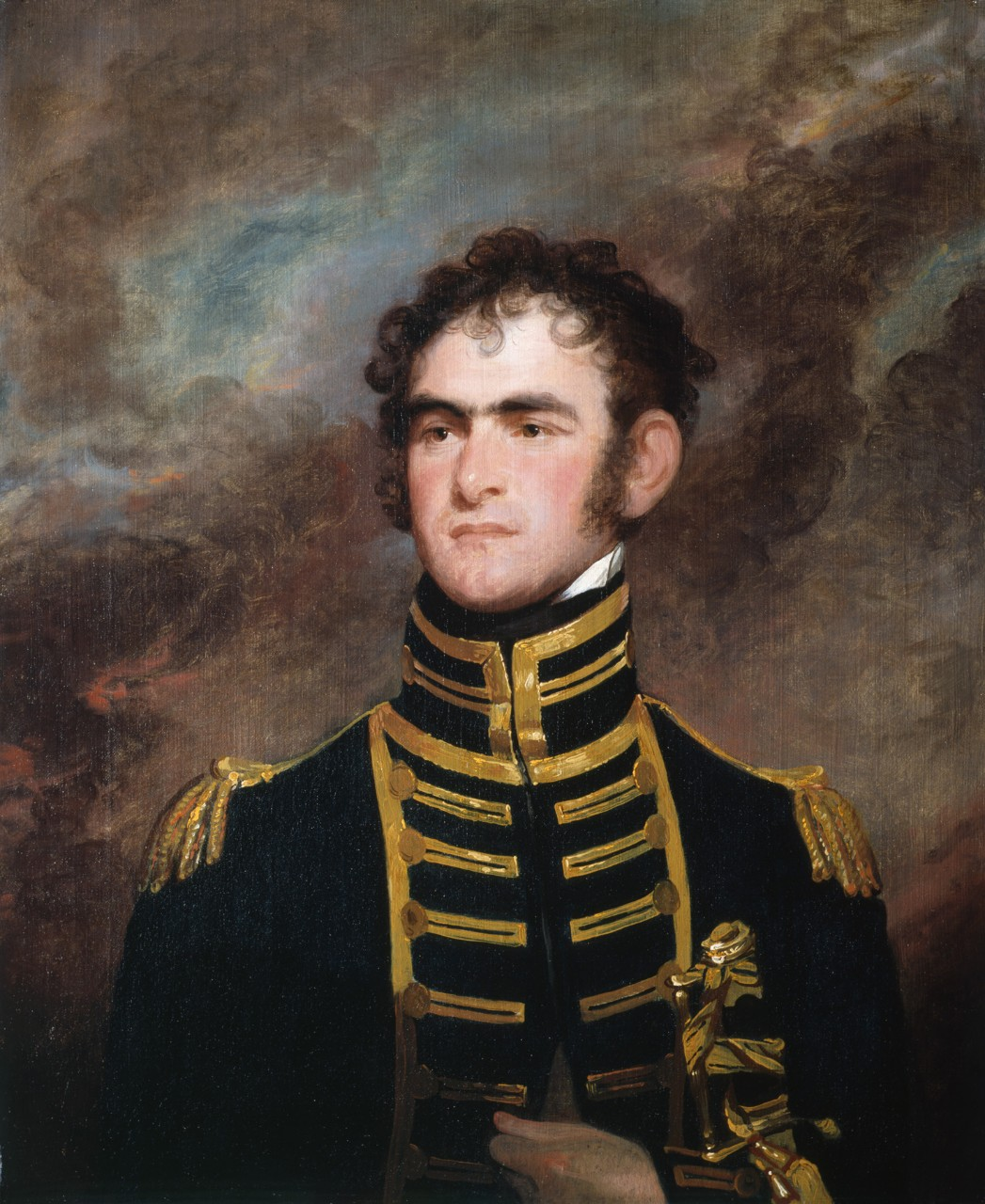
John Rodgers

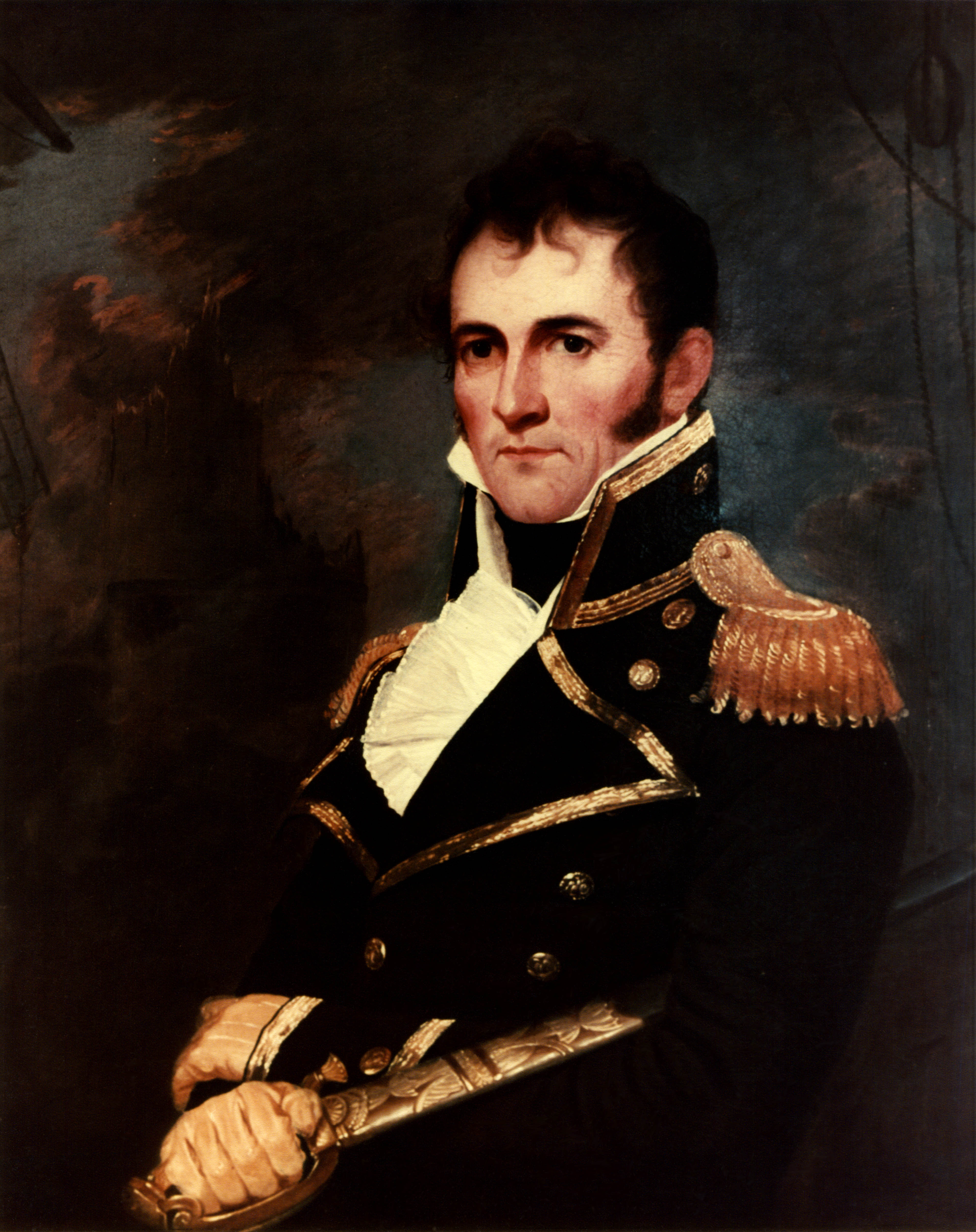
David Porter

The end of the action signaled the first victory over an enemy warship for the newly formed United States Navy. (Note: The first capture was on 7 July 1798 when the USS Delaware captured without resistance the French privateer Le Croyable.) After Barreaut had struck his colors, Truxtun sent a boat over to board, identify, and take possession of the French vessel. It was only upon boarding L'Insurgente that the Americans learned the identity of their opponents. The storm and the battle had caused immense damage to the French frigate. In comparison, Constellation had suffered moderate damage to her rigging, but was otherwise still intact. French casualties included 29 killed and 41 wounded, while the Americans suffered two dead and two wounded. One American died shortly after the action ended, of wounds received from French fire; another was executed for cowardice by Constellation's Lieutenant Andrew Sterett after the man deserted his gun at the start of the action.

Constellation began taking on prisoners of war from L'Insurgente, but by nightfall the two ships had become separated in a storm. Left aboard L'Insurgente were Constellation's First Lieutenant John Rodgers, Midshipman David Porter, and 11 enlisted men, along with 170 French prisoners. The Americans were forced to sail the vessel short-handed while guarding the French prisoners. As the prisoners outnumbered their captors and no gear to secure them could be found aboard, the Frenchmen were driven into L'Insurgente's lower holds. Finally, after three nights, L'Insurgente was brought in to Saint Kitts where Constellation was waiting for her. While at the American naval depot at Saint Kitts, Constellation's troublesome 24-pounder guns were removed and replaced with 18-pounder cannons. At the American prize court in Norfolk, Virginia, L'Insurgente was condemned to be sold as a war prize, with the proceeds distributed to the crew of Constellation. Secretary of the Navy Benjamin Stoddert managed to negotiate the prize award down from $120,000 to $84,000 before purchasing L'Insurgente and commissioning her in the United States Navy as USS Insurgent.

For his victory over L'Insurgente, Truxtun received honors both at home and abroad. When accounts of the action reached London, Truxtun was fêted by the merchants there who sent him a piece of silver plate to commemorate his victory. In the United States, morale soared upon hearing of the first American victory over the French. Truxtun was cited by Stoddert for his excellent conduct during the action, and songs and poems such as Brave Yankee Boys were later written about the event. In contrast, when Barreaut returned to France he was accused of failing to put up sufficient resistance in the engagement and was given a court-martial. Despite the accusations, he had been praised by Truxtun after the action for his bravery and was acquitted during the court-martial. The French were infuriated upon hearing the results of the action because the two countries were not officially at war; Governor Edme Étienne Borne Desfourneaux of Guadeloupe demanded that Insurgent be returned to French control. Upon learning of the American refusal to repatriate Insurgent, Desfourneaux was outraged and ordered all American vessels and property to be seized, while also declaring that a state of war existed between the United States and Guadeloupe. After continuing their cruise for a few weeks, both Insurgent and Constellation were forced to return to Norfolk by the end of March due to the expiration of the terms of enlistment of their crews. On her next cruise Constellation prevailed in another action against La Vengeance, although her own casualties were heavy this time, and that French frigate escaped L'Insurgente's fate.

== Bibliography ==
- Allen, Gardner Weld (1909). Our naval war with France. Boston & New York: Cornell University Library. ISBN 1-112-12707-0. OCLC 610803.
- Bauer, Karl Jack (1991). Register of Ships of the U.S Navy 1775–1990 Major Combatants. Westport: Greenwood Press. ISBN 0-313-26202-0. OCLC 24010356.
- Bonnel, Ulane (1961). La France, Les Etats Unis et la guerre de course. Paris: Nouvelles Editions Latines. ISBN 978-2-7233-1260-8. OCLC 557759130.
- Cutler, Thomas J. (2005). A Sailor's History of the U.S. Navy. Annapolis: Naval Institute Press. ISBN 1-59114-151-6. OCLC 56729983.
- James, William (2004). Naval Occurrences of the War of 1812. London: Conway Maritime Press. ISBN 0-85177-987-5. OCLC 56462600.
- Martin, Iain C. (2006). The Greatest U.S. Navy Stories Ever Told. Guilford: The Lyons Press. ISBN 978-1-59228-859-5. OCLC 70159581.
- Myers, Walter Dean (2004). USS Constellation Pride of the American Navy. New York: Holiday House. ISBN 0-8234-1816-2. OCLC 52902755.
- Palmer, Michael A. (1987). Stoddert's War. Annapolis: Naval Institute Press. ISBN 1-55750-664-7. OCLC 15162322.
- Roberts, Walter Adolphe (1942). The U.S. Navy Fights. Indianapolis: The Bobbs-Merrill Company. ISBN 978-0-8369-2068-0. OCLC 1381928.
- Spears, John Randolph (1897). The History of Our Navy from Its Origin to the Present Day, 1775–1897. New York: Charles Scribner's Sons. p. 321. OCLC 843924. "insurgent constellation."
- Sweetman, Jack (2002). American Naval History:an illustrated chronology of the U.S. Navy and Marine Corps, 1775–present. Annapolis, MD: Naval Institute Press. ISBN 1-55750-867-4.
- Toll, Ian W (2006). Six Frigates: The Epic History of the Founding of the US Navy. New York: W. W. Norton. ISBN 978-0-393-05847-5. OCLC 633333009.
- Troude, Onésime-Joachim (1867). Batailles Navales De La France, Volume 3. Paris: Ainé. OCLC 162373241.
- Wheeler, Richard (1969). In Pirate Waters. New York: Crowell. OCLC 6144.
