= Truxton =

Truxton may refer to:

- Truxton, Arizona, a settlement south of the Grand Canyon in Mohave County, Arizona, USA
- Truxton, Missouri, a small town 70 miles (110 km) west of St. Louis
- Truxton, New York, a town in Cortland County, New York, USA
- Truxton (video game), a 1988 arcade game (known as Tatsujin in Japan)
  - Truxton II, a sequel
- Truxton Bowl, a porcelain bowl presented to George Washington in 1794
- Thomas Truxtun or Truxton, (1755-1822), American naval officer
- Truxton (horse), owned at one time by Andrew Jackson

== See also ==
- New Truxton, Missouri
- Truxton Circle, Washington, D.C., a neighborhood
- Truxton Park - Hermitage, TN, a sub-division near Nashville, Tennessee, USA
