= USS Truxtun (DDG-103) =

U.S. Navy destroyer

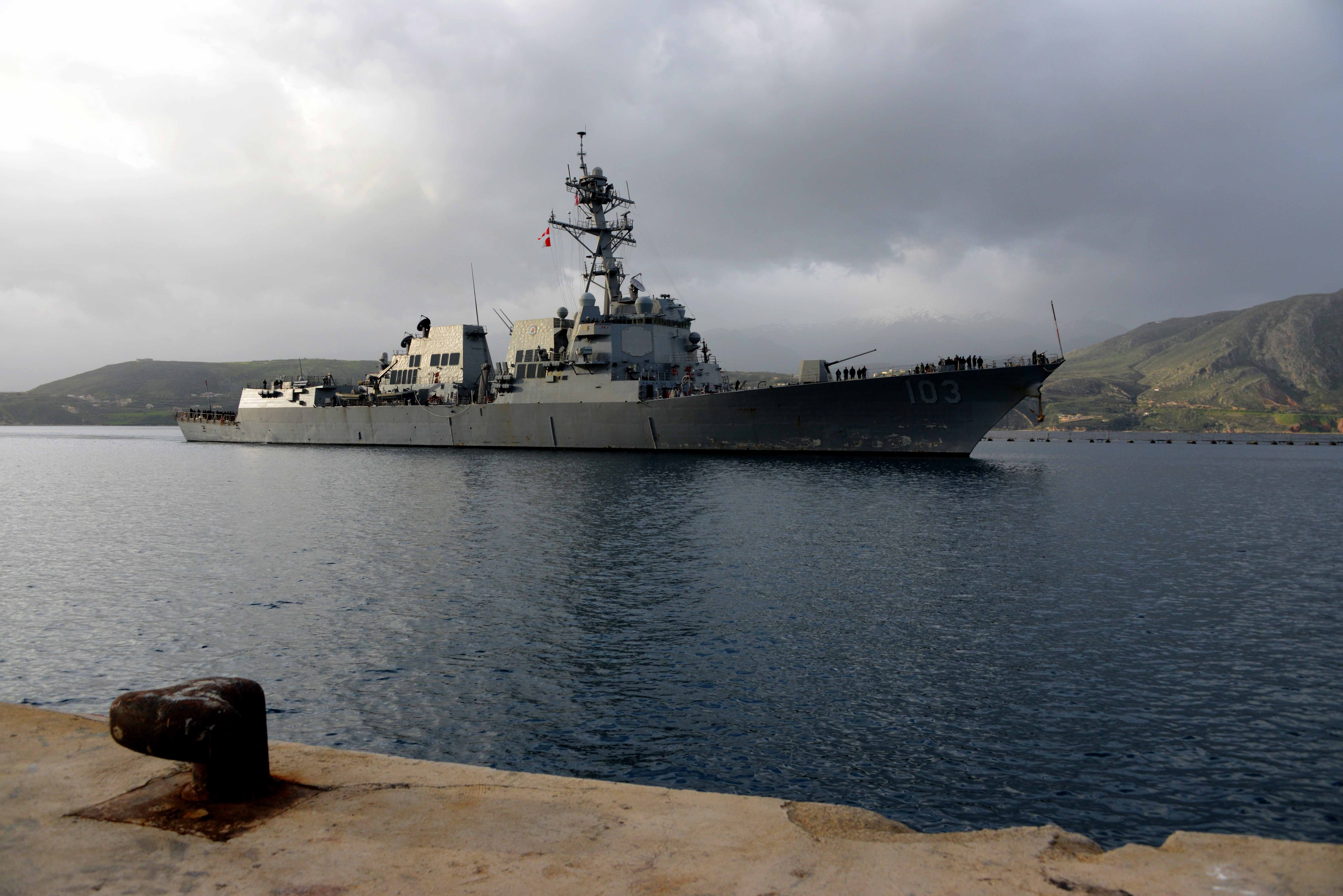
- USS Truxtun (DDG 103) on 21 September 2012

History

United States
- Name: Truxtun
- Namesake: Thomas Truxtun
- Awarded: 13 September 2002
- Builder: Ingalls Shipbuilding
- Laid down: 11 April 2005
- Launched: 17 April 2007
- Christened: 2 June 2007
- Acquired: 24 October 2008
- Commissioned: 25 April 2009
- Home port: Norfolk
- Identification: MMSI number: 303882000; Callsign: NTRX; Hull number: DDG-103
- Motto: Pursue Attack Vanquish
- Status: in active service
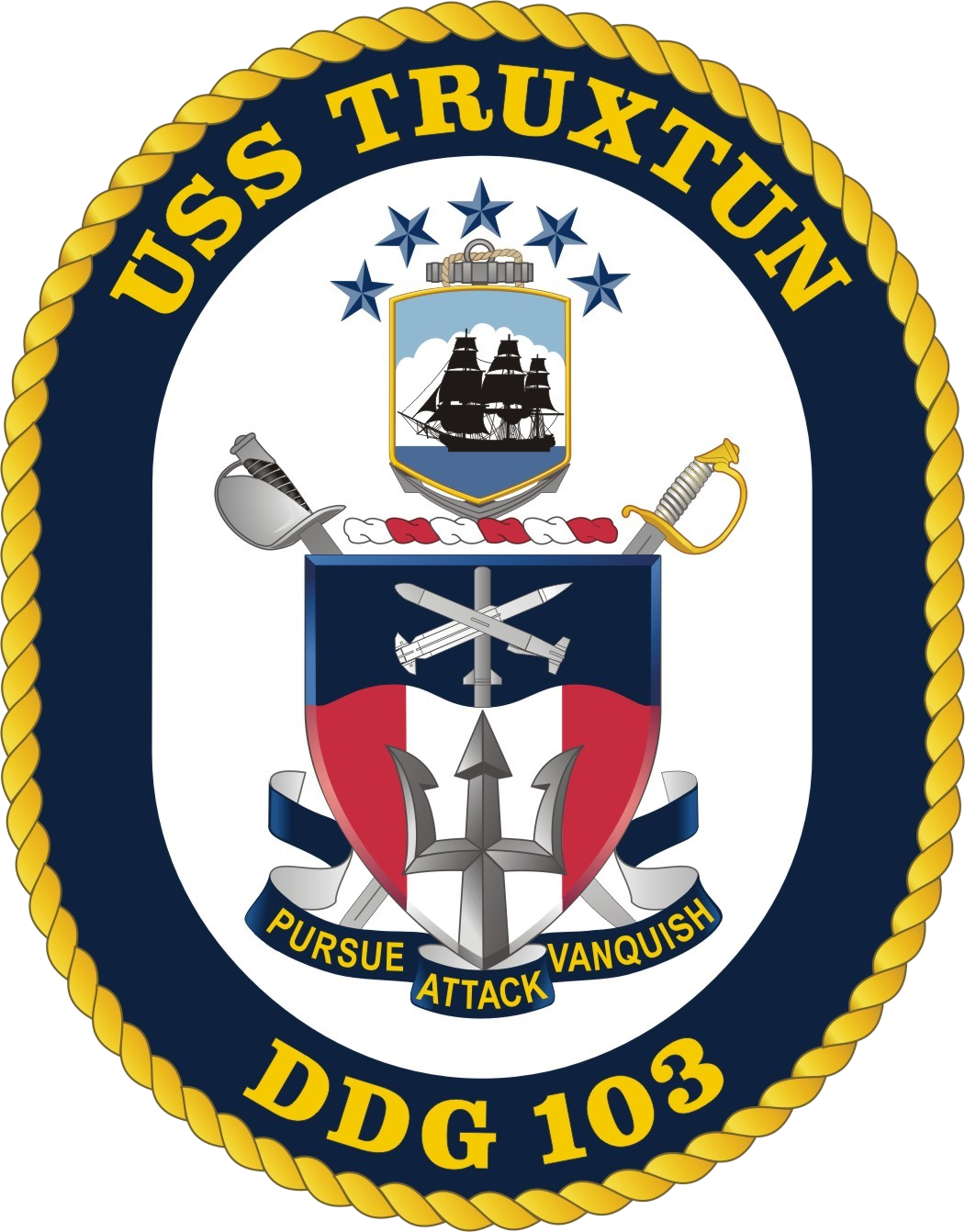
- Notes

General characteristics
- Class & type: Arleigh Burke-class destroyer
- Displacement: 9,200 tons
- Length: 510 ft (160 m)
- Beam: 59 ft (18 m)
- Draft: 31 ft (9.4 m)
- Propulsion: 2 × shafts
- Speed: In excess of 30 kn (56 km/h; 35 mph)
- Range: 4,400 nmi (8,100 km; 5,100 mi) at 20 kn (37 km/h; 23 mph)
- Complement: 380
- Sensors & processing systems: AN/SPY-1D radar; AN/SPS-67(V)2 surface-search radar; AN/SPS-64(V)9 surface-search radar; AN/SQS-53C sonar array; AN/SQQ-28 LAMPS III shipboard system
- Electronic warfare & decoys: AN/SLQ-32 electronic warfare suite; AN/SLQ-25 Nixie torpedo countermeasures; Mk 36 Mod 12 decoy launching systems; Mk 53 Nulka decoy launching systems; Mk 59 decoy launching systems
- Armament: Guns: 1 × 5-inch (127 mm)/62 Mk 45 Mod 4 (lightweight gun); 1 × 20 mm (0.8 in) Phalanx CIWS; 2 × 25 mm (0.98 in) Mk 38 machine gun system; 4 × 0.50 in (12.7 mm) caliber guns; Missiles: 1 × 32-cell, 1 × 64-cell (96 total cells) Mk 41 vertical launching system (VLS): RIM-66M surface-to-air missile; RIM-156 surface-to-air missile; RIM-174A Standard ERAM; RIM-161 anti-ballistic missile; RIM-162 ESSM (quad-packed); BGM-109 Tomahawk cruise missile; RUM-139 vertical launch ASROC; Torpedoes: 2 × Mark 32 triple torpedo tubes: Mark 46 lightweight torpedo; Mark 50 lightweight torpedo; Mark 54 lightweight torpedo
- Aircraft carried: 2 × MH-60R Seahawk helicopters

USS Truxtun (DDG-103) is an Arleigh Burke-class (Flight IIA) Aegis guided missile destroyer currently in service with the United States Navy. She is named for American Naval hero Commodore Thomas Truxtun (1755–1822), one of the first six commanders appointed by George Washington to the newly formed U.S. Navy. She is the sixth U.S. naval warship to bear his name.

== Construction ==
Truxtun's keel was laid down on 11 April 2005. During construction at Ingalls Shipbuilding, Pascagoula, Mississippi, she suffered a major electrical fire on 20 May 2006, engulfing two levels and causing damage estimated to be worth millions of dollars. She was launched on 17 April 2007, then christened on 2 June 2007, in Pascagoula, with Truxtun's descendants, Susan Scott Martin and Carol Leigh Roelker, serving as sponsors, and commissioned on 25 April 2009, in Charleston, South Carolina. As of July 2020 the ship is part of Destroyer Squadron 26 based out of Naval Station Norfolk.

== Ship history ==
In 2012, the US Navy contracted with L3 Technologies to develop a fuel-efficient hybrid electric drive train for the Flight IIA Arleigh Burke guided missile destroyers. The system proposed used a pre-existing quill drive on the reduction gearbox, allowing an electric motor to drive the ships up to 13 kn (24 km/h; 15 mph). Truxtun was fitted with the permanent magnet motor system in 2012, under a research and development contract with General Atomics. In March 2018, the US Navy announced that the trial program to install hybrid electric drives in 34 destroyers would be cancelled leaving Truxtun as the only ship so fitted.

In March 2014, Truxtun sailed to the Black Sea, to conduct training with the Romanian and Bulgarian navies. The deployment of Truxtun, along with sister ship Donald Cook, to the Black Sea, was intended as a "strategic reassurance" for former Soviet republics and satellite states concerned about the annexation of Crimea by the Russian Federation.

On 10 August 2020, Truxtun completed a deployment with the Dwight D. Eisenhower Carrier Strike Group, without any port calls, that lasted for almost seven months.

At a Pentagon press briefing on 24 April 2023, a spokesperson stated that Truxtun was "... off the coast of Sudan, near the Port of Sudan. It will stay there awaiting further orders should it be needed to support. Also, en route is the USS Lewis B. Puller (ESB-3)".

On 12 June 2024, USS Truxtun along with the USS Donald Cook, USS Delbert D. Black, Coast Guard cutter Stone, and a Boeing P-8 maritime patrol aircraft were deployed to track a Russian naval flotilla sailing less than 30 miles off the coast of Key Largo, Florida. The flotilla was expected to arrive the same day in Havana, Cuba for naval and air exercises.

In September 2025, Truxtun participated in BRIGHT STAR 25, an exercise in Egypt.

On 11 February 2026, Truxtun collided with USNS Supply during sea resupplying in the Caribbean Sea. Two sailors were injured and both ships sailed safely after the collision.

On 4 May 2026, American forces reportedly destroyed six or seven small Iranian boats in the Strait of Hormuz in a clash during the Operation Project Freedom as part of the 2026 Iran war. The boats were destroyed after they allegedly tried to interfere with the transit of two US flagged commercial vessels and USS Truxtun and USS Mason.

== Awards ==
- CNO Ship-Helicopter Safety award - (2023)

== In popular culture ==
Truxtun was seen in the feature film Captain Phillips, standing in for USS Bainbridge.
