= USRC General Green (1798) =

Ship of the U.S. Revenue Cutter Service

History

United States
- Name: General Green
- Operator: Revenue Cutter Service
- Commissioned: 25 March 1798. Transferred to U.S. Navy, unknown date
- Recommissioned: transferred back to U.S. Revenue–Marine, 20 May 1799

General characteristics
- Class & type: Sloop
- Tonnage: 98
- Propulsion: Sail
- Crew: 34
- Armament: 10 X 4 pounders

USRC General Green (also known as General Green No. 2) was a cutter operated by the U.S. Revenue–Marine. She was named for the Revolutionary War hero Major General Nathanael Greene.

== Operational history ==
Commissioned into the U.S Revenue–Marine on 25 March 1798 probably at her builders in Philadelphia, Pennsylvania. Her first master was George Price. She was commanded by Captain Price after being transferred to the U.S. Navy. She was with USS Delaware when Delaware took privateer Marsoui on 5 March 1799 off Havana. In a letter dated 20 May 1799, Navy Secretary Benjamin Stoddert notified the Treasury Secretary that he should consider General Green to be officially transferred from the U.S. Navy back to the Revenue–Marine.
