= French ship Sémillante =

Three ships of the French Navy have borne the name Sémillante ("shiny" or "sparkling"):

- French corvette Sémillante, a 20-gun Coquette-class corvette (1780–1787)
- French frigate Sémillante (1791), a 32-gun frigate, lead ship of her class
- French frigate Sémillante (1841), a 60-gun frigate (1841–1855)
