= List of ships named John and James =

Several ships have been named John and James:

- John and James (1792 ship) was built in Philadelphia in 1792. On a voyage to Europe a French frigate captured her; the French government eventually released her and paid an indemnity to her owner. She then made a voyage for the British East India Company (EIC). On a second voyage a French privateer captured her.
- John and James (1796 ship) was built in France in 1791 under another name and taken in prize in 1796. New owners renamed her and initially sailed her as a West Indiaman. She then made a voyage for the British East India Company (EIC). Next, she became a slave ship, making three voyages between West Africa and the West Indies. Finally, she became a whaler, but was lost in 1806 to a mutinous crew.
- John and James was a Nantucket whaler that between 1808 and 1813 made four whaling voyages. On 6 December 1813 as John and James, Crosby, master, was returning from Chili with 1000 barrels of oil, Pomone captured her and sent her into Bermuda.

Citations
