= Capture of La Croyable =

Naval battle of the Quasi-War

Coordinates: 39.305°N 74.647°W

- Part of the Quasi-War
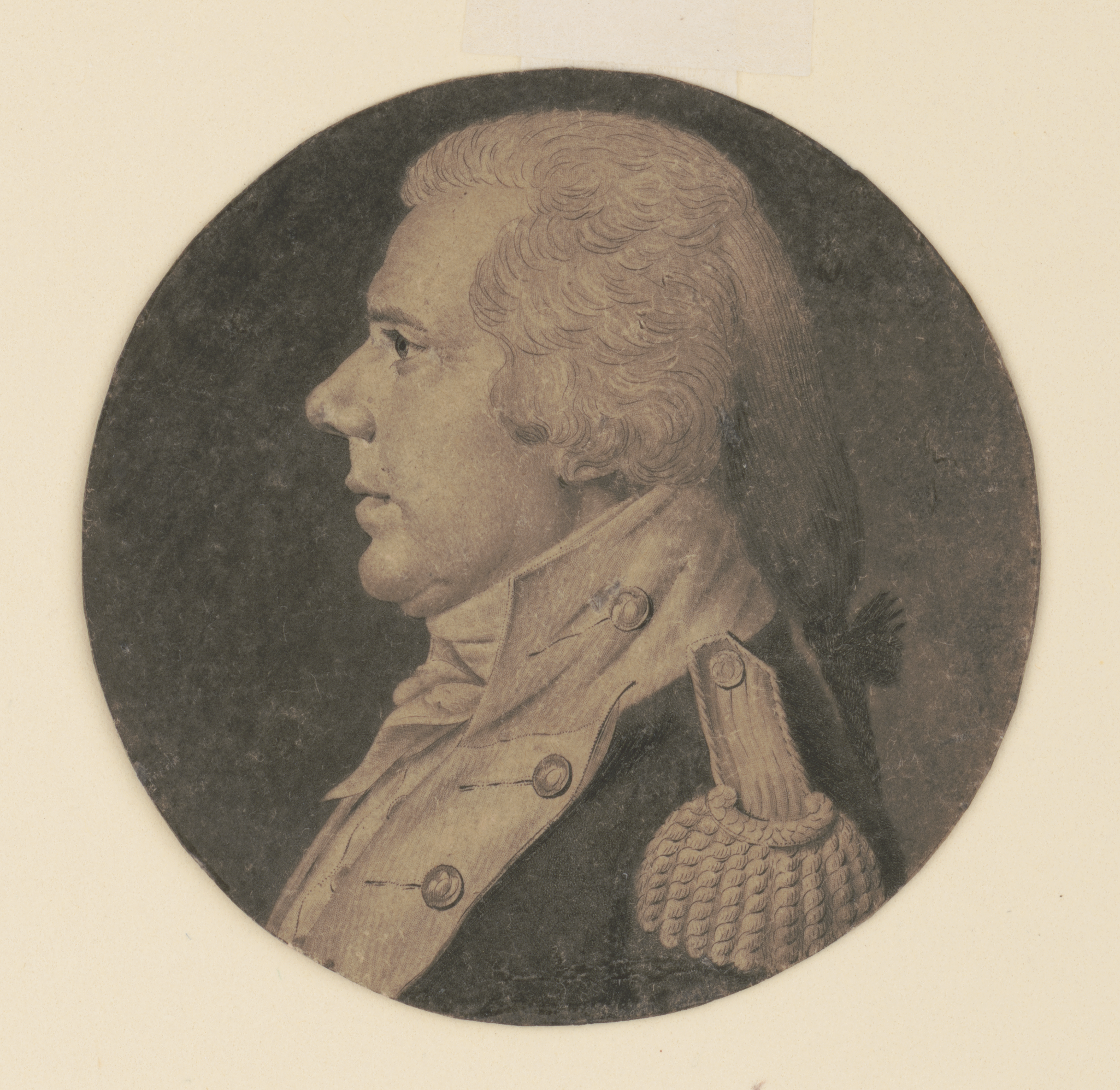
- An illustration of Stephen Decatur, Sr.
Date	July 7, 1798
Location	Great Egg Harbor Bay, New Jersey, United States
Result	American victory

Belligerents
United States	France

Commanders and leaders
Stephen Decatur, Sr.	Unknown

Strength
1 sloop-of-war: 180 crew; 20 guns	1 schooner (surrendered): 70 crew; 12-14 guns

Casualties and losses
None	None; 1 schooner captured

The Capture of La Croyable, or the Action of July 7, 1798, occurred when the French privateer schooner La Croyable was taken by the American sloop-of-war USS Delaware on 7 July 1798 during the Quasi-War. The engagement resulted in the first capture of any ship by the United States Navy, which had been formed just months before the action.

Originally a merchant ship called Hamburgh Packet, USS Delaware was purchased by the United States Navy on May 5, 1798. With a complement of 180 men and twenty mounted long guns – sixteen 9-pounders (4.1 kilograms) and four 6-pounders (2.7 kilograms), she was given to Captain Stephen Decatur, Sr. to command. Delaware set sail from Delaware Bay on July 6 with instructions to join USS United States and USS Ganges and patrol the section of the Atlantic Coast between Long Island and Cape Henry.

On July 7 the day after her first sail, USS Delaware happened upon the American merchant vessel Alexander Hamilton, which had been carrying wine and brandy from New York City to Baltimore when she was stopped by a French privateer who ransacked her. She was reduced to limping across the Great Egg Harbor Bay. When Captain Decatur heard these reports from Alexander Hamilton's crew, he began scouting the bay for a potentially culpable French vessel.

An attack by a French privateer on an American merchantman was not unheard of at the time. Tensions between the United States and France had been rising in the months prior to the attack. The United States Congress had instructed all American warships in the newly-formed United States Navy to "capture any French vessel found near the coast preying upon American commerce." Congress had also commissioned one thousand letters of marque to combat against the French hostilities of the day. Captain Decatur, who had distinguished himself as a privateer during the American Revolutionary War, was now looking to make the most of the opportunity to command Delaware.

In the midst of her search for the French privateers, Delaware spotted four sails on the horizon. Under Decatur's orders, the sloop's crew had her pretend to be a merchant vessel. The act was convincing enough to draw the attention and pursuit of the French privateer schooner La Croyable. It was not long before the captain of the French vessel discovered that Delaware was a warship and tried to reverse course. After a lengthy chase, La Croyable found herself pinned against the shore of Great Egg Harbor Bay. She surrendered after only a few cannon shots.

On July 8 Delaware made her way back up the Delaware River with her prize and docked at Fort Mifflin. After executing the US Navy's first victory of the Quasi-War, Decatur became a hero. He boasted of his catch to several people, including Captain John Barry of USS United States. La Croyable was deemed a lawful capture by the U.S. government and renamed USS Retaliation. She was given to the command of Lieutenant William Bainbridge. Bainbridge would join a fleet of American ships in the Caribbean on October 15. Later in November, however, the French frigates Volontaire and Insurgente attacked USS Retaliation, capturing her. This was the only American naval vessel to be captured during the entire Quasi-War, which was later recaptured by the U.S. Navy.

== Sources ==
- Footner, Geoffrey M. (1998). Tidewater Triumph: The Development and Worldwide Success of the Chesapeake Bay Pilot Schooner (illustrated ed.). Naval Institute Press. ISBN 0913372803.
- Sweetman, Jack (2002). American Naval History: An Illustrated Chronology of the U.S. Navy and Marine Corps, 1775-present (illustrated ed.). Naval Institute Press. ISBN 1557508674.
- Tucker, Spencer C. (2014). The Encyclopedia of the Wars of the Early American Republic, 1783–1812: A Political, Social, and Military History. ABC-CLIO. ISBN 978-1598841572.
