= USS Truxtun =

USS Truxtun has been the name of various United States Navy ships in honor of Commodore Thomas Truxtun, and may refer to:

- USS Truxtun (1842), a brig launched in 1842 and destroyed after running aground off Mexico in 1846
- USS Truxtun (DD-14), a destroyer in service from 1902 to 1919
- USS Truxtun (DD-229), a destroyer commissioned in 1921 that ran aground and sank in 1942
- USS Truxtun (APD-98), laid down as a destroyer escort (DE-282) in 1943, completed as a high-speed transport (APD-98) in 1945, and in commission as such from 1945 to 1946.
- USS Truxtun (CGN-35), originally guided missile destroyer leader DLGN-35, a guided missile cruiser in commission from 1967 to 1995
- USS Truxtun (DDG-103), an Arleigh Burke-class destroyer, commissioned in 2009.
