= Stephen Decatur Sr. =

United States Navy officer

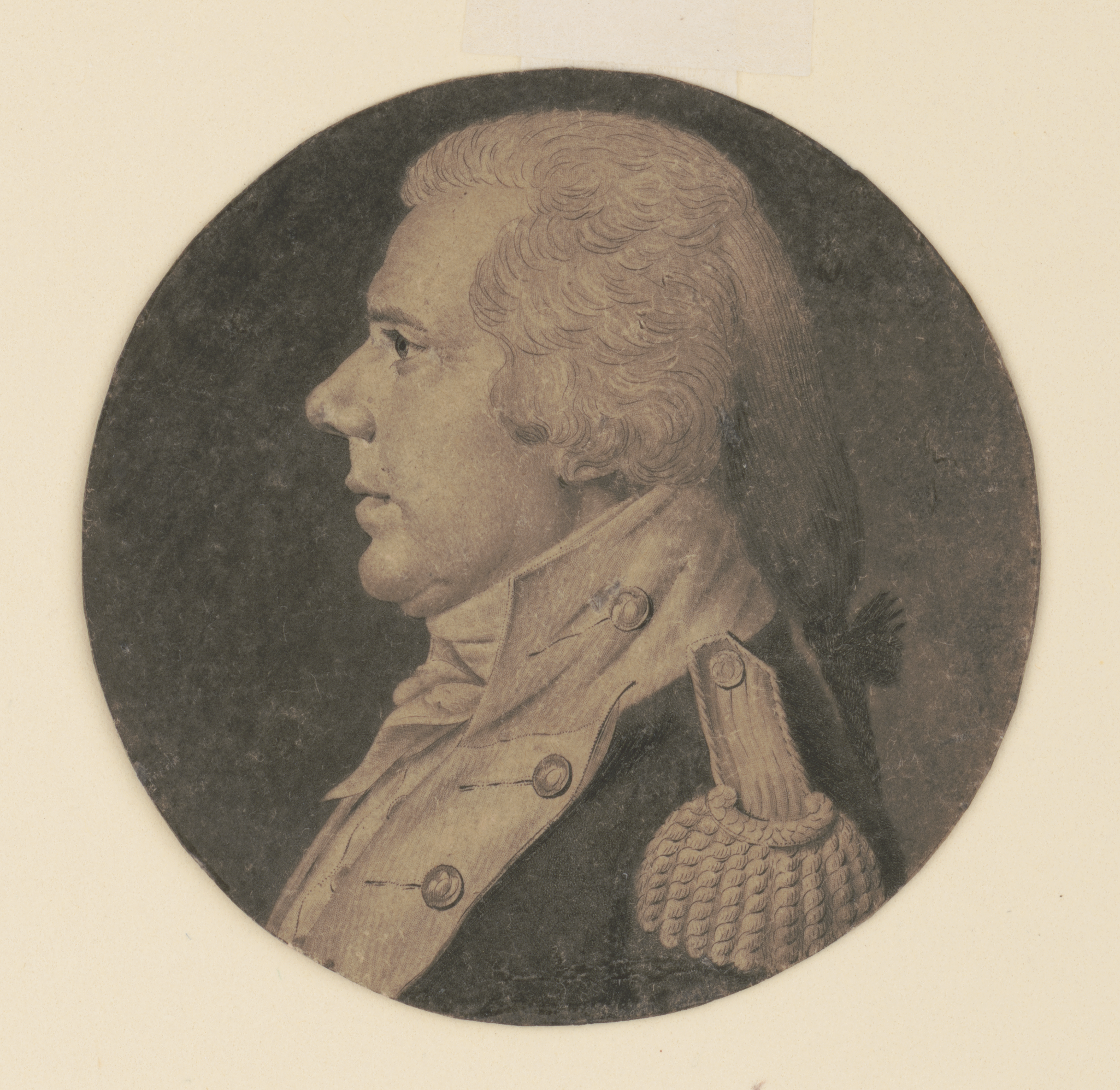
- 1802 portrait of Decatur by Charles Balthazar Julien Févret de Saint-Mémin
- Born: June 1751; Newport, Rhode Island, British America
- Died: November 11, 1808 (aged 57); Philadelphia, Pennsylvania, U.S.
- Burial place: St. Peter's Church; Philadelphia, Pennsylvania, U.S.
- Spouse: Ann Pine
- Children: 3, including Stephen Jr.
- Military career
- Allegiance: United States
- Branch: United States Navy
- Rank: Captain
- Commands: Royal Louis; Fair American; USS Delaware
- Conflicts: American Revolutionary War; Quasi-War; Capture of La Croyable

Decatur house in Newport
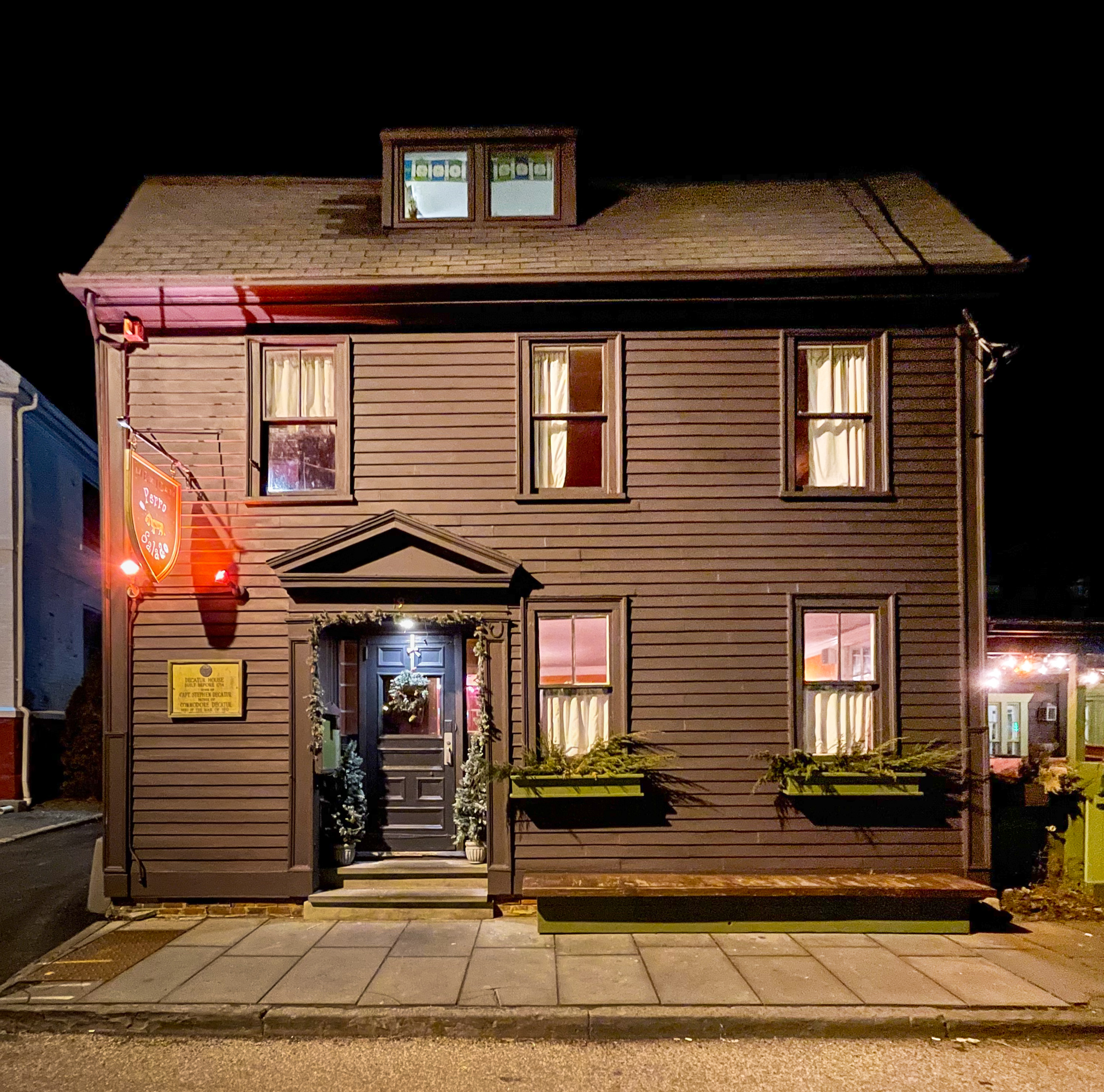
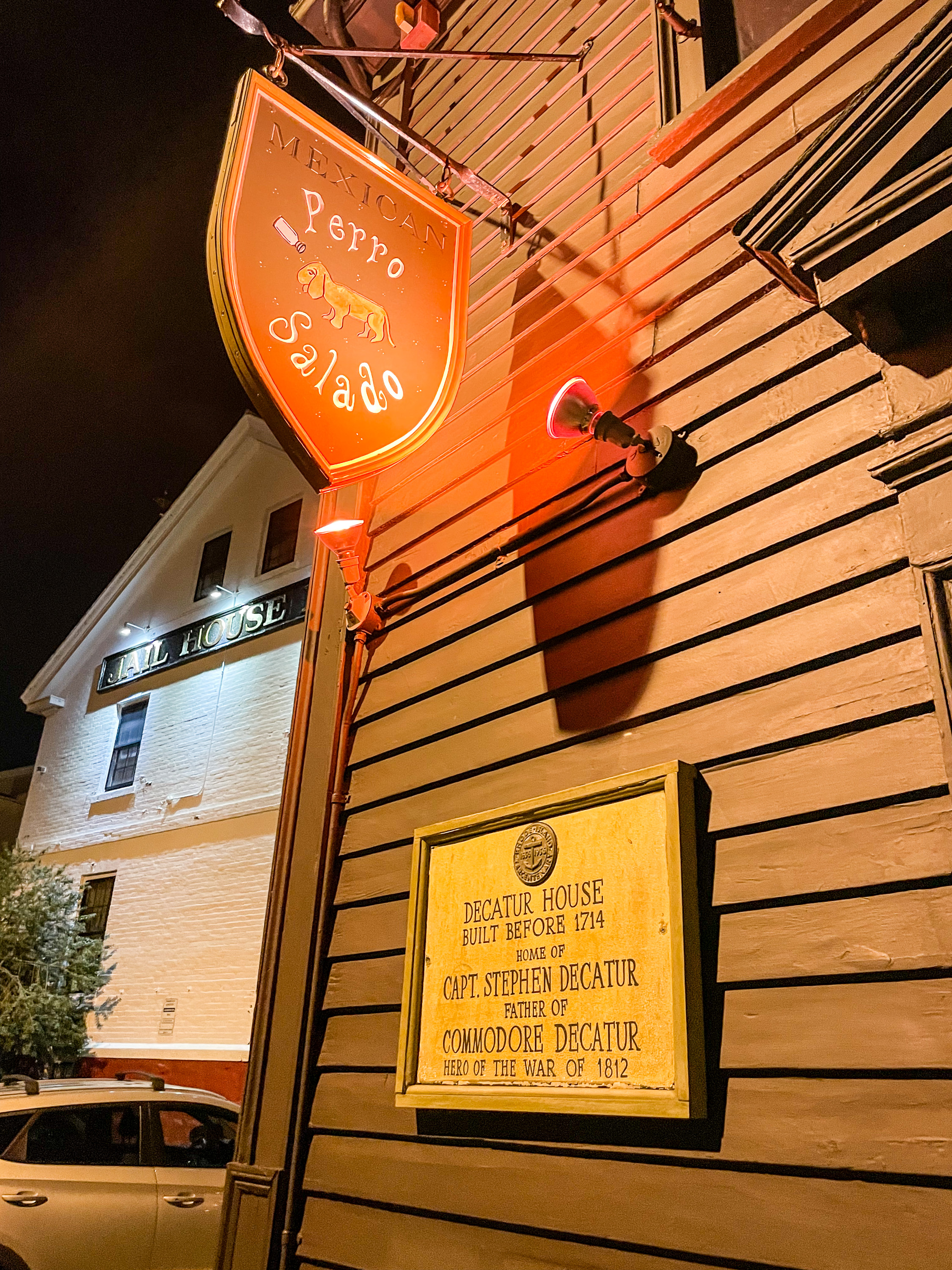

Stephen Decatur Sr. (June 1751 – November 11, 1808) was a United States Navy officer and privateer who served in the American Revolutionary War and the Quasi-War. He was commissioned as a captain in the United States Navy, and was the father of Stephen Decatur.

== Life ==
Born in Newport, Rhode Island, baptized June 7, 1752. Decatur was a merchant captain before the Revolution. He married Ann Pine, daughter of John and Nancy Pine, in Philadelphia on December 20, 1774. They had 7 children, including Commodore Stephen Decatur (1779-1820), James Bruce Decatur (1782-1804), Ann Pine Decatur (1776-1819, and John Pine Decatur (1786-1832).

During the American Revolution he commanded the Royal Louis and the Fair American.

With the outbreak of the Quasi War with France, Decatur was commissioned as a captain in the United States Navy on May 11, 1798.

On May 5, 1798, Decatur was placed in command of the converted merchant ship USS Delaware and sailed in the first American Navy squadron to cross the Atlantic along with his son Stephen Decatur Jr. Delaware captured a French privateer, La Croyable, off Great Egg Harbor, N.J., on 7 July 1798. The U.S. Navy purchased La Croyable on 30 July 1798, and renamed her USS Retaliation. From 14 July to 23 September, Delaware cruised in the West Indies, often in company with the frigate USS United States, and together the ships took two privateers prize. During her second cruise in the West Indies, between 15 December 1798 and 20 May 1799, she took another prize.

In 1800, Decatur commissioned Philadelphia, the very vessel that his son later burned several months after it ran aground and was captured near Tripoli harbor in 1803.

In accordance with the Peace Establishment Act of 1801, which greatly reduced the United States Army and Navy, Decatur was discharged from the Navy on October 22, 1801.

He died in 1808, at his country home "Millsdale" in Frankford, Pennsylvania. He is interred next to his famous son at St. Peter's Church in Philadelphia.

== Bibliography ==
- MacKenzie, Alexander Slidell (1846). Life of Stephen Decatur: a commodore in the Navy of the United States. Boston: C. Little and J. Brown.
- Waldo, Samuel Putnam (1821). The life and character of Stephen Decatur (PDF). Hartford, Conn.: P. B. Goodsell.
- William Decatur Parsons (1921). The Decatur Genealogy 1746-2003. New York.
