= Truxton Bowl =

The Truxtun Bowl is a Chinese porcelain punch bowl made for Captain Thomas Truxtun in 1794. Captain Truxtun is noted for his command of the frigate USS Constellation during the Quasi-War with France in 1798 to 1800. Truxtun had served on privateers during the American Revolutionary War. After the Revolution, as a Philadelphia merchant captain, he was a pioneer of American trade with China. In 1794, Truxtun was appointed one of six captains to oversee the building of the United States Navy's first frigates. That year, to illustrate a book he was publishing on navigation, he asked naval constructor, Josiah Fox, who would play a part in designing these ships, for a drawing of a 44-gun frigate. Truxtun commissioned two punch bowls featuring Fox's drawing. One of these is currently held in the library of the U.S. Naval Institute in Annapolis. Previously held at the U.S. Navy Museum at the Washington Navy Yard in Washington, D.C., it was moved after the Naval Historical Foundation was dissolved in 2022. The other bowl, presented to President George Washington, is in Washington's home of Mount Vernon.
