= Prince Frederick (1795 ship) =

History

Dutch Republic
- Name: Prinz Fredrik
- Owner: Dutch East India Company
- Builder: Amsterdam Dockyard
- Launched: 1793
- Fate: Seized December 1795

United Kingdom
- Name: Prince Frederick
- Owner: J. Scougall
- Acquired: 1795 by purchase of a prize
- Captured: 5 December 1797
- Fate: Foundered shortly thereafter

General characteristics
- Tons burthen: Dutch: 1150 (Dutch); English:916 (bm)
- Sail plan: Full-rigged ship
- Complement: 173 seamen + 19 soldiers (Dutch)
- Armament: 20 × 9-pounder + 2 × 4-pounder guns (British)

Prince Frederick was launched at Amsterdam in 1793 for the Dutch East India Company as Prinz Fredrik. Captain Daniel Correch stopped at The Downs, where she was detained. In December 1795, the British Government confiscated the ship.

J. Scougall purchased her and anglicised her name. Prince Frederick appears in Lloyd's Register in 1796 with Ramage, master, J. Scougall, owner, and trade London–Cape of Good Hope.

Captain Peter Ramage sailed her to Bengal on a voyage as an "extra ship" for the British East India Company (EIC). As Prince Frederick was returning from Madras and Bengal, the French frigate Insurgente captured her on 5 December 1797. Prince Frederick was so badly damaged in the engagement that she sank soon afterwards. Her people, however, were saved. The EIC put a value of £59,981 on the cargo that it had lost.
