= Sémillante-class frigate =

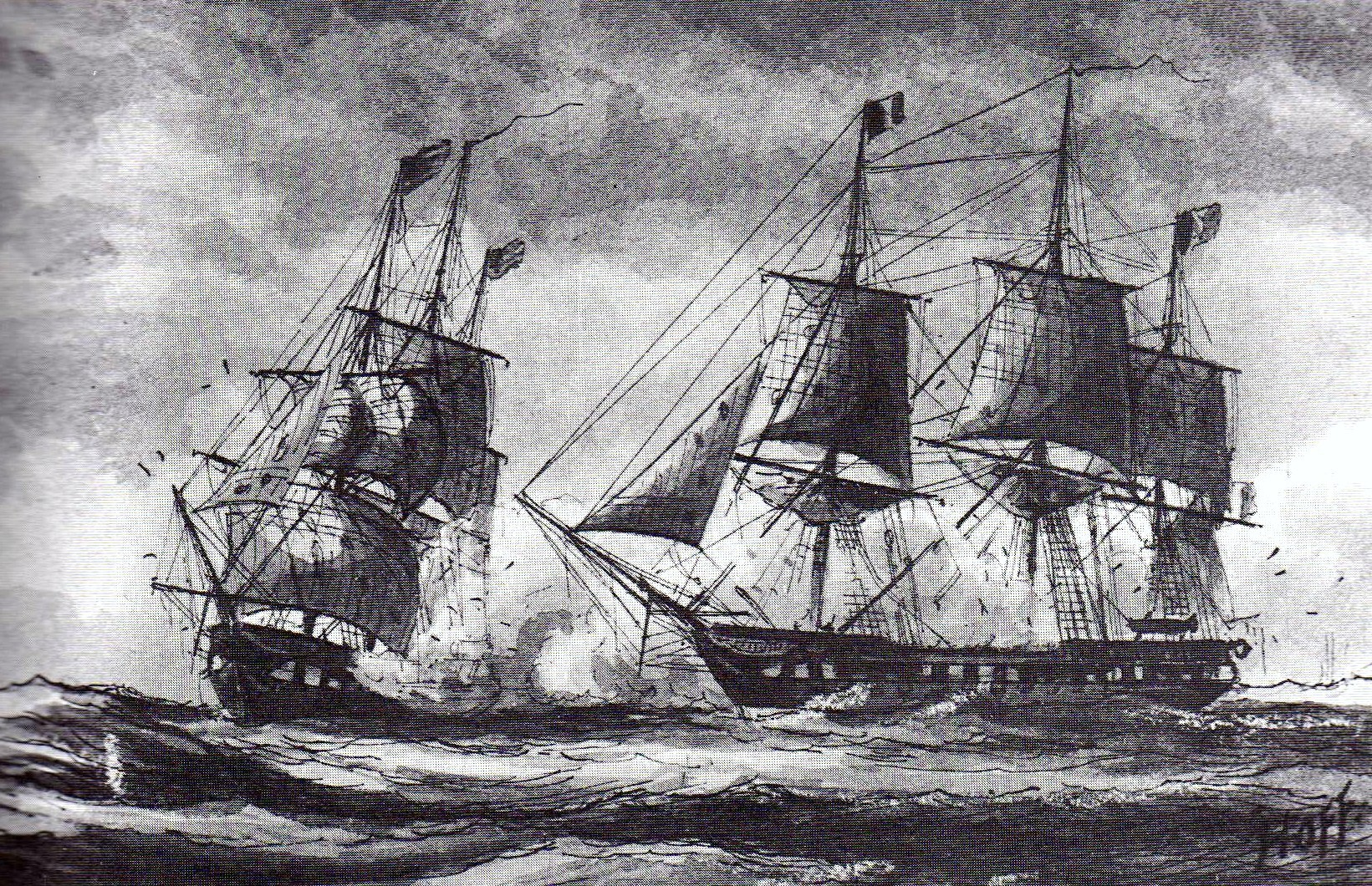
- Naval encounter during the Quasi-War between Insurgente (right) and USS Constellation on 9 February 1799

Class overview
- Name: Sémillante
- Operators: French Navy; United States Navy
- Preceded by: Félicité class
- Succeeded by: Charente Inférieure class
- Planned: 2
- Completed: 2

General characteristics
- Type: Frigate
- Tons burthen: 600 port tonneaux
- Length: 45.47 m (149 ft 2 in) (gundeck); 40.28 m (132 ft 2 in) (keel)
- Beam: 11.53 m (37 ft 10 in)
- Draught: 5.3 m (17 ft 5 in)
- Depth of hold: 5.66 m (18 ft 7 in)
- Propulsion: Sails
- Sail plan: Ship
- Armament: 32 guns; 26 × 12-pounder long guns; 6 × 6-pounder long guns

The Sémillante class was a type of 12-pounder, 32-gun frigate of the French Navy, designed by Pierre-Joseph Pénétreau.

- Sémillante

Builder: Lorient
Ordered: 23 April 1790 (named)
Laid down: December 1790
Launched: 25 November 1791
Completed: May 1792
Fate: Given to Robert Surcouf at Mauritius in September 1808 and armed by him as a privateer, renamed Charles. Captured by the Royal Navy in December 1809 and broken up.

- Insurgente

Builder: Lorient
Ordered: 3 September 1790
Laid down: 5 November 1791
Launched: 27 April 1793
Completed: June 1793
Fate: Captured by the US Navy off Nevis on 8 February 1799, recommissioned as USS Insurgent, but lost at sea in a hurricane in September 1800.
