= John and James (1792 ship) =

History

United States
- Name: John and James
- Builder: Philadelphia
- Launched: 1792
- Fate: Sold 1795

Great Britain
- Name: John and James
- Owner: Killock & Co., of London
- Acquired: 1795
- Captured: 1797

General characteristics
- Tons burthen: 335 (bm)

John and James was built in Philadelphia in 1792. On a voyage to Europe a French frigate captured her; the French government eventually released her and paid an indemnity to her owner. She then made a voyage for the British East India Company (EIC). On a second voyage a French privateer captured her.

== Career ==
John and James was built at Philadelphia in 1792 for George Morrison of Petersburg, Virginia. In 1793 she departed Petersburg with 450 hogsheads of tobacco and 12,000 staves. On 16 January 1794 the French frigate Insurgente captured her and brought her into Brest. On 4 April Lloyd's List reported that John and James, Johnson, master, from Virginia, to Falmouth, "and a market", had been taken and sent into Brest. On 27 December the Tribunal of Commerce ordered John and James released to Captain James Johnson and the Committee of Public Safety awarded him a payment of 20,000 Livres.

John and James made one voyage as an "extra ship" for the EIC. Captain James Johnson sailed from The Downs on 27 August 1795. She reached Calcutta on 6 February 1796. She returned to The Downs on 25 August.

John and James sailed on a second voyage to Madeira and India. However, in January 1797 a French privateer captured her off Madeira, and sent her into Corunna, where she was condemned in prize.
