= USS Insurgent =

French and later US frigate launched in 1793

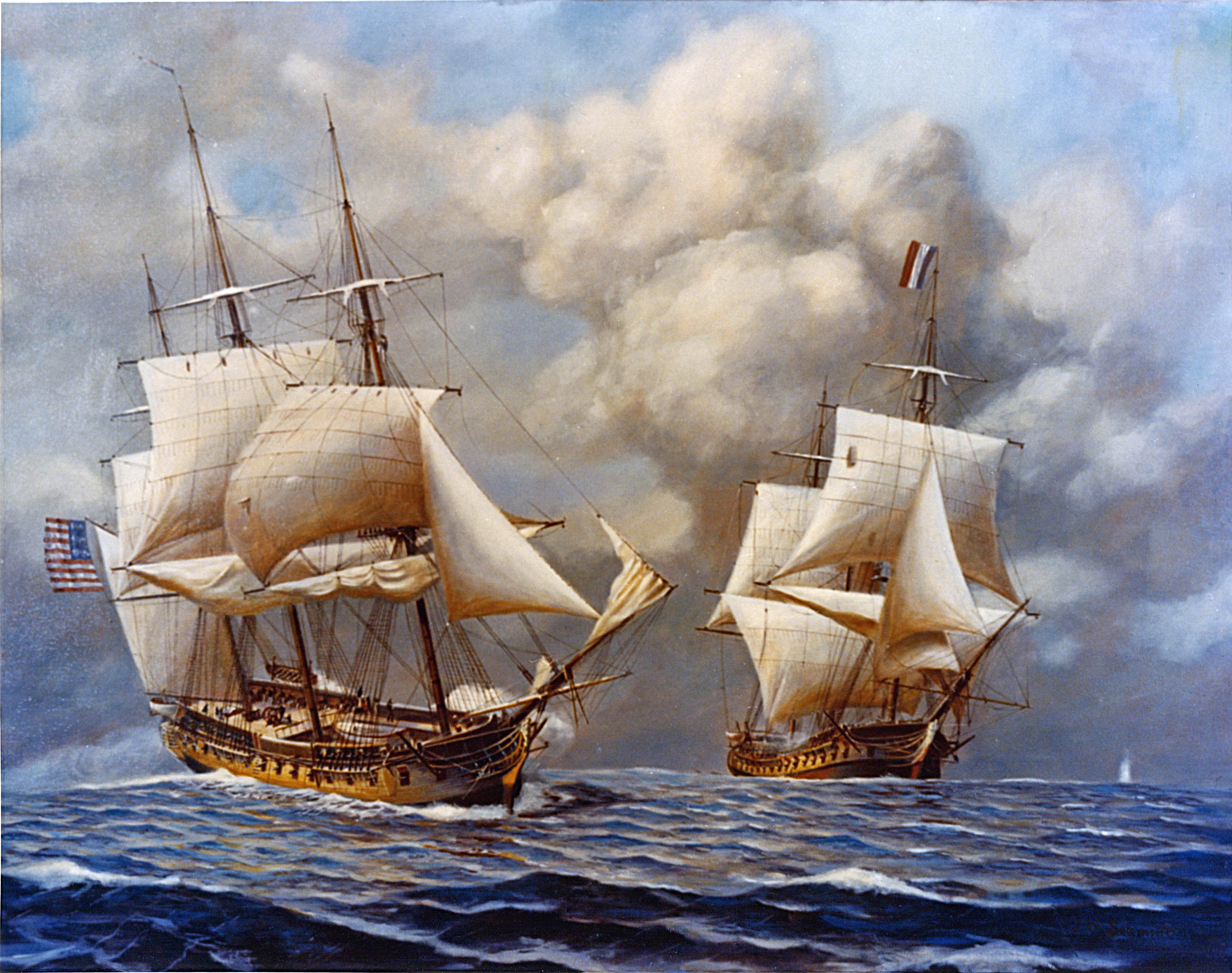
- Naval encounter during the Quasi-War between USS Constellation and Insurgente (right) on 9 February 1799

History

France
- Name: Insurgente
- Ordered: 3 September 1790
- Builder: Pierre-Joseph Pénétreau, Lorient
- Laid down: 5 November 1791
- Launched: 27 April 1793
- Captured: by USS Constellation, 9 February 1799

United States
- Name: USS Insurgent
- Acquired: 9 February 1799
- Commissioned: August 1799
- Fate: Lost at sea, probably foundered September 1800

General characteristics
- Type: Sémillante-class frigate
- Tons burthen: 600 port tonneaux
- Length: 45.5 m (149 ft 3 in)
- Beam: 11.5 m (37 ft 9 in)
- Draft: 5.5 m (18 ft 1 in)
- Complement: French service:Officers + 278 men; US service: 340 officers and enlisted
- Armament: French service (initially): 26 × 12-pounder long guns +; 6 × 6-pounder long guns; French service (1798–1799): 2 × 18-pounder long guns + 24 × 12-pounder guns; 8 × 6-pounder guns + 4 × 36-pounder howitzers +; 2 × 24-pounder carronades; US service: 26 × 18-pounder + 10 × 12-pounder guns; 4 × 36-pounder howitzers

Insurgente was a 40-gun Sémillante-class frigate of the French Navy, launched in 1793. During the Quasi War with the United States, the United States Navy frigate USS Constellation, with Captain Thomas Truxtun in command, captured her off the island of Nevis. After her capture she served in the United States Navy as USS Insurgent, patrolling the waters in the West Indies. In September 1800 she was caught up in a severe storm and was presumed lost at sea.

== French service ==
Insurgente was built by Pierre-Joseph Pénétreau at Lorient and launched on 27 April 1793.

In January or February 1794, Insurgente captured Ann off Cape Clear Island as Ann was sailing from Newfoundland to Bristol. Insurgente put a prize crew aboard Ann, but left her mate and three other men on board. When Ann was in sight of the French coast, the British sailors succeeded in recapturing her from the prize crew; the British then took Ann into Vigo.

On 16 January 1794 Insurgente captured the American ship John and James and brought her into Brest. John and James had been built at Philadelphia for George Morrison of Petersburg, Virginia. She had left Petersburg with 450 hogsheads of tobacco and 12,000 staves. On 27 December 1794 the Tribunal of Commerce ordered John and James released to Captain James Johnson and the Committee of Public Safety awarded him a payment of 20,000 livres tournois.

On 25 April Insurgente captured Freundschaft Lourentz, Colandt, master, as Freundschaft Lourentz was sailing from Lisbon to London. However two "Scilly boats" (i.e., boats from the Isles of Scilly), recaptured her the next day and brought her into St Ives, Cornwall.

On 5 December 1797 Insurgente captured Prince Frederick as Prince Frederick was returning from Madras and Bengal. Prince Frederick was so badly damaged in the engagement that she sank soon afterwards. Her people, however, were saved. The EIC put a value of £59,981 on the cargo that it had lost.

US-French Quasi War: On 20 November 1798 she captured USS Retaliation off Guadalupe. Insurgente was transporting General Desfourneaux from France, via Cayenne, French Guiana, to Guadalupe to replace Victor Hugues as Governor. After dropping off Desfourneaux she returned Hugues to France and returned to Guadeloupe.

== Battle with Constellation ==
On 9 February 1799, after being at sea for three days, USS Constellation spotted Insurgente approximately six leagues (29 km) northeast off Nevis. Insurgente, a fully-rigged frigate, was considered one of the fastest sailing vessels in the world at the time; three weeks earlier she had encountered Constellation but was able to outrun her and escape. Shortly after being spotted by Constellation this second time the ships encountered a squall during which a violent gust of wind snapped Insurgente's main topmast, impairing her speed. As Constellation approached, Captain Michael-Pierre Barreaut first attempted to seek haven by making for St. Eustatius, but to no avail, where Insurgente hauled wind and assumed a starboard tack. After being overtaken she hoisted American colors, at which time Constellation hoisted the private signals. Unable to respond appropriately, she gave up her attempt at disguise and Captain Barreaut ordered the French tri-colors hoisted and a gun fired to windward to signal the challenge where Insurgente boldly sat in wait to be engaged. This was the first time since the American Revolution that a shot had been fired from an enemy vessel at an American ship. Captain Thomas Truxtun gave the order to clear the deck of Constellation for action and the boatswain sounded the whistle. Both ships bore up to take positions to engage. Constellation fired the first broadside, double-shotted, inflicting much damage to the French vessel's hull and killing many in the first minute of the engagement. Insurgente responded and fired a broadside, inflicting much damage to Constellation's rigging and fore topmast, which was almost cut off. At 3:30 pm after an hour and a half of running battle and several raking broadsides from Constellation, Insurgente struck her colors. First Lieutenant John Rodgers, Midshipman David Porter along with eleven men were put on board the captured vessel to take possession and to secure the prisoners who were sent to the lower hold. She had lost 70 men from a crew of 409, while Constellation, badly damaged also, only lost three out of a complement of 309. This was the first post-Revolutionary War American victory against a foreign naval vessel.

There were no handcuffs to be found and the prisoners seem disposed to rebel. Accordingly, Rodgers placed sentries at the hatch, armed with blunderbusses and under orders to open fire should the prisoners attempt to breach the hatch way.

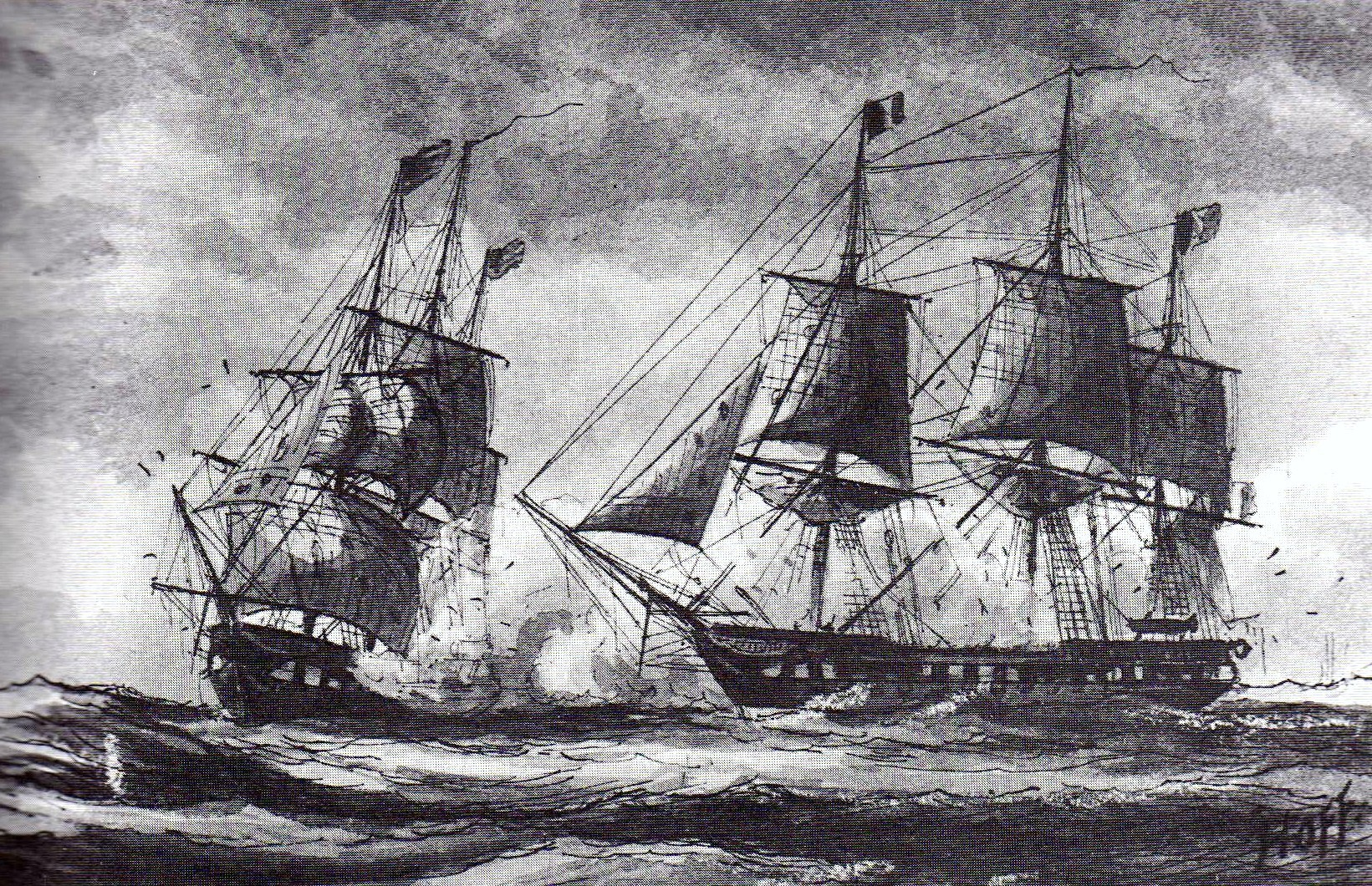
Scene depicting the action of 9 February 1799, when USS Constellation (left), commanded by Captain Thomas Truxtun, captured the French frigate Insurgente (right)

== Service in US Navy ==
The US Navy considered Insurgent a prize in the Quasi-War with France. The frigate was taken to the West Indies and refitted for service in the young American navy. She cruised under Lt. John Rodgers in company with Constellation until May 1799. On 17 April 1799 she and USS Constellation captured French letter of marque schooner Diligente off Basse-Terre, Guadeloupe. Ordered back to the United States, Insurgent was purchased by the Navy for $84,500. Commissioned with Captain Alexander Murray in command, Insurgent sailed from Hampton Roads for Europe and the Caribbean on 14 August 1799. She arrived at Lisbon, Portugal on 13 September, She departed on 17 September with HMS Phaeton for the Straits of Gibraltar. She arrived at Cadiz, Spain on 23 Sept., and was off Algeciras 24-28. Proceeded on to Cape Spartel, Madieras, Tenerife, and on to Cayanne, Surinam and Barbados. On 14 November she recaptured British brig "Margaret" captured the day before by a French privateer. On 20 November she and USS Adams off Guadeloupe recaptured schooner "Nancy", captured on 18 November by a French privateer. On 10 December she was off St. Pierre. On 28 December she recaptured merchantman "Commerce" that had been captured by a french privateer off Antigua earlier in the day. On 22 or 23 January 1800 she recaptured schooner "Aurora". On 5 February while sailing to Jamaica she came across dismasted USS Constellation, heavily damaged in a battle with French heavy frigate La Vengeance, limping to Jamaica. She escorted her to Jamaica. She then proceeded to head for home and was 15 leagues west of Havana, Cuba on 27 February. Sometime in February she recaptured "William and Mary" Cruising in European waters during the winter of 1799–1800, the frigate captured the French ship Vendémiaire and recaptured the American ship Angora. She arrived in the Patapsco River on 13 March 1800 after being damaged in rough weather off Cape Hatteras.

== Loss ==
On 29 April 1800 Patrick Fletcher assumed command and was ordered to cruise between the West Indies and the American coast to protect American shipping interests and to capture any enemy vessels he encountered. Insurgent departed Baltimore on 22 July with 340 crew and after a brief stop at Hampton Roads sailed for her station 8 August 1800. She was never heard from again, and the frigate and her crew were presumed lost during the severe storm that struck the West Indies on 20 September 1800. This storm is also thought to have sunk USS Pickering, which likewise vanished without a trace. To date her sinking is the largest non combat related loss of life in the United States navy on one ship.

== See also ==
- List of French sail frigates
- Original six frigates of the United States Navy
- List of ships captured in the 18th century
- Glossary of nautical terms (A-L)
- Glossary of nautical terms (M-Z)
