= USS Delaware (1798) =

American ship

History

United States
- Name: USS Delaware
- Namesake: Delaware
- Builder: Philadelphia Naval Shipyard
- Laid down: 1794
- Acquired: by purchase, May 5, 1798
- Fate: Sold, June 1801

General characteristics
- Tons burthen: 321 (bm)
- Length: 94 ft 9 in (28.88 m)
- Beam: 28 feet
- Draft: 14 ft (4.3 m)
- Complement: 180 officers and enlisted
- Armament: 16 × 9-pounder guns; 4 × 6-pounder guns

The second USS Delaware was a ship which served in the United States Navy during Quasi-War with France.

The USS Delaware was designed by naval architect William Doughty and built in the Philadelphia Naval Yard in 1794 as the merchant ship Hamburgh Packet. The Navy purchased her on May 5, 1798. Captain Stephen Decatur, Sr., was appointed to command and outfit her for sea.

During the Quasi-War with France, Delaware cruised to protect American merchant shipping from French privateers. She guarded convoys during their approach to Philadelphia and New York, patrolled the West Indies, and escorted convoys into Havana.

Her first prize, the privateer La Croyable, was taken off Great Egg Harbor July 7, 1798. Lloyd's List (LL) reported on 17 August that the American sloop-of-war Delaware had captured a French privateer of the American coast. The privateer had captured the merchantman Liberty, Vredenburg, master, which had been sailing from Philadelphia to Liverpool. Liberty had since been recaptured.

From 14 July to 23 September, she cruised in the West Indies, often in company with the frigate United States, and together the ships took two privateers prize. During her second cruise in the West Indies, between December 15, 1798, and May 20, 1799, she took another prize, privateer "Marsouin" on 5 March 1799 off Havana and won the thanks of the merchants of Havana for the protection she had given merchantmen sailing to that port. She headed home and was off Fort Mifflin by 23 May 1799.

Between cruises Capt. Thomas Baker became her captain & a new crew was recruited.

Delaware's return to the West Indies from July 1799 to July 1800 found her joining the Revenue Cutter Eagle in taking a privateer sloop. Sometime in October she and USS Pickering recaptured brig "Henrich". She took privateer brig "Ocean" on October 29, 1799, off Curaçao after a 7-hour chase, rescuing 30 Americans held prisoner in the privateer. Due to Capt. Baker's health, he was replaced at the end of July 1800 by Master Commander J. A. Spotswood. She made a final cruise off Cuba in the late fall and winter of 1800–1801, then returned to Baltimore. In a letter dated 20 February 1801 to Josiah Parker, Chaiman of the Committee on Naval Affairs, Navy Secretary Stoddert recommended selling her. She was sold at Baltimore for $23,799.28 early in June 1801.

== See also ==
- Glossary of nautical terms (A-L)
- Glossary of nautical terms (M-Z)
- List of sailing frigates of the United States Navy
- USS Delaware vs La Croyable
