= USS Constellation (1797) =

U.S. naval frigate commissioned in 1797

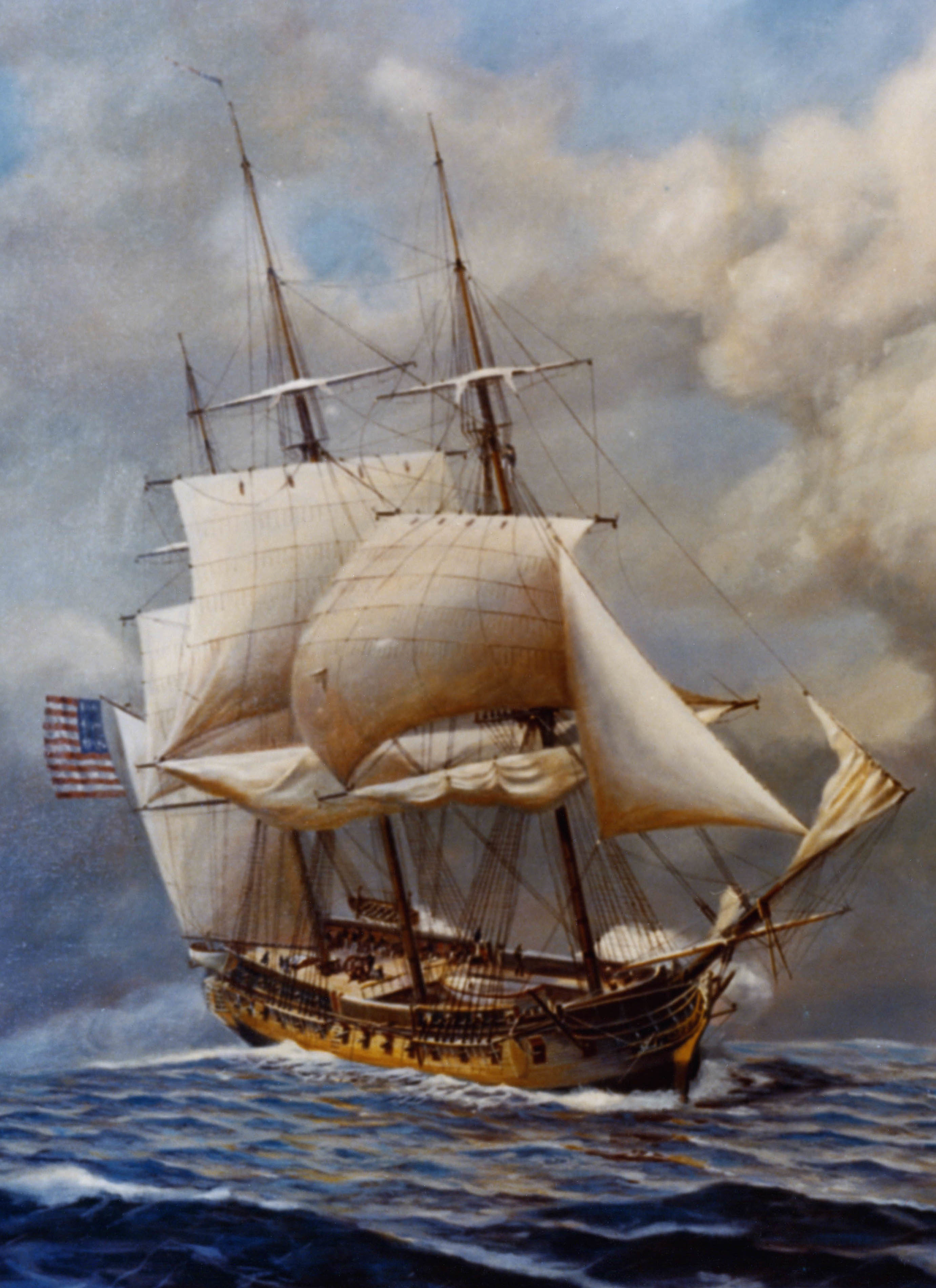
- USS Constellation by John W. Schmidt

History

United States
- Name: USS Constellation
- Namesake: The 15 stars in the contemporary United States national flag
- Ordered: 27 March 1794
- Builder: David Stodder
- Cost: $314,212
- Launched: 7 September 1797
- Home port: Baltimore Maryland USA
- Nickname(s): "Yankee Racehorse"
- Fate: Broken up, 1853

General characteristics
- Class & type: 38-Gun frigate
- Displacement: 1,265 tons
- Length: 164 ft (50 m) between perpendiculars length at Keel 136 feet
- Beam: 41 ft (12 m) or 40 feet, 6 inches
- Depth of hold: 13.5 ft (4.1 m)
- Decks: Orlop, Berth, Gun, Spar
- Propulsion: Sail (three masts, ship rig)
- Complement: 340 officers and enlisted
- Armament: 28 × 18-pounder long guns; 20 × 32-pounder carronades

USS Constellation was a nominally rated 38-gun wooden-hulled, three-masted frigate of the United States Navy.

The ship was built under the direction of David Stodder at The Joseph and Samuel Sterett shipyard on Harris Creek in Baltimore's Fell's Point maritime community, and was launched on 7 September 1797. Constellation was one of the original six frigates whose construction the Naval Act of 1794 had authorized.

The name "Constellation" was among ten names submitted to President George Washington by Secretary of War Timothy Pickering in March 1795 for the frigates that were to be constructed. The Flag Act of 1777 speaks of how the stars in the flag are "representing a new constellation".

Joshua Humphreys designed these frigates to be the young Navy's capital ships, and so Constellation and her sisters were larger and more heavily armed and built than standard frigates of the period. The Constellation's first duties with the newly formed U.S. Navy were to provide protection for American merchant shipping during the Quasi-War with France and to defeat the Barbary pirates in the First Barbary War.

== Design and construction ==
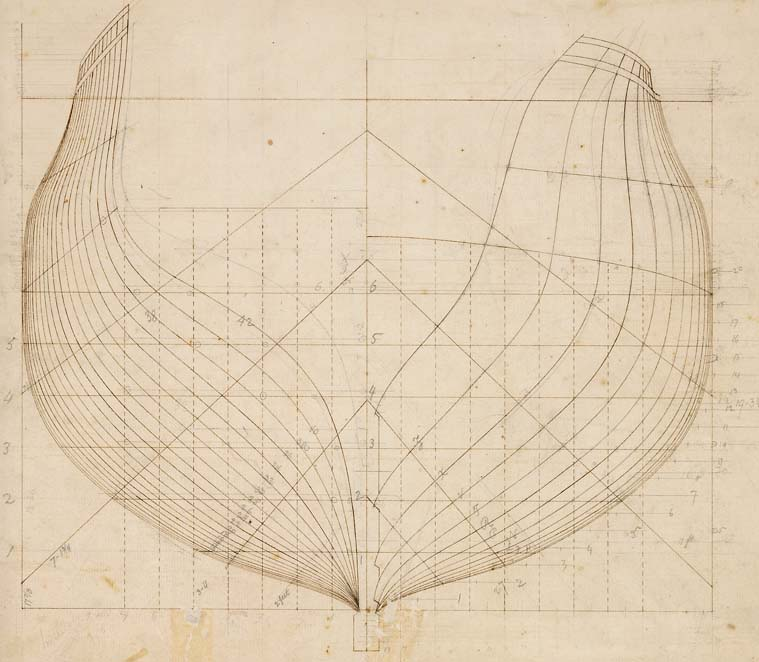
Design of the hull of USF Constellation, which was shared with USF Congress.

American merchant vessels began to fall prey to Barbary Pirates, along the so-called "Barbary Coast" of North Africa, Morocco, Tunis (in future Tunisia), Tripoli (in future Libya), and most notably from Algiers (in future Algeria), in the Mediterranean Sea during the 1790s. Congress responded with the Naval Act of 1794. The Act provided funds for the construction of six frigates to be built in six different East Coast ports; however, it included a clause stating that construction of the ships would cease if the United States agreed to peace terms with Algiers. By the time of the conclusion in 1815, of the later War of 1812 with Great Britain, the United States had fought a series of three brief, but savage naval and amphibious wars.

Joshua Humphreys' design was deep, long of keel, affording high speed downwind and efficiency when close-hauled. The design was to extremely heavy scantlings, including the planking, and incorporated Humphreys' innovative diagonal rib to limit hogging. This gave the hull greater strength than those of more lightly built frigates. Humphreys developed his design after realizing that the fledgling United States could not match for size the navies of the European states. He therefore designed his frigates to be able to overpower other frigates, but with the speed to escape from a "ship of the line" (equivalent to a modern-day "battleship"). However, Constellation was a scaled-down version of his more famous designs for Constitution, United States and President, being closer in size to the standard European frigates of the day, and mounting the usual armament of 18-pounder guns.

Constellation was built under the direction of Colonel David Stodder at his naval shipyard on Harris Creek in Baltimore's Fell's Point maritime community, according to a design by Joshua Humphreys. She was launched on 7 September 1797, just as the United States entered the Quasi-War with the revolutionary French Republic. Harris Creek which flows into the Northwest Branch of the Patapsco River was later filled in to gain additional land for residential/industrial development and diverted underground to a subterranean storm drain and culvert in the early 19th century. It was situated east of Fell's Point and south of where modern-day Patterson Park, (near Highlandtown), and the community of Canton are currently located.

An earlier visitor to the Harris Creek naval shipyard of David Stodder, east of Baltimore Town in 1796, the Duke de la Rochefoucaule-Liancourt, saw Constellation under construction and noted in his journal: "I thought her too much encumbered with wood-work within, but in other respects she is a fine vessel being built of those beautiful kinds of wood, the ever-green oak and cedar; she is pierced for 36 guns."

=== Armament ===
The Naval Act of 1794 had specified 36-gun frigates; however, Constellation and her sister-ship Congress were re-rated to 38's because of their large dimensions, being 164 ft (50 m) in length and 41 ft (12 m) in width. (Note: Officially in congressional documents Constellation was a 36-gun frigate. Chapelle states Constellation and Congress were re-rated to 38's during construction by Humphreys because of their large dimensions. Canney references Chapelle when rating Constellation a 38-gun frigate, but also questions "... exactly what Humphreys had in mind with rating these ships as 44- or 36-gun frigates when the number of ports certainly did not correspond to the rating and, in fact, the ships rarely carried their rated batteries, reflecting contemporary usage. That first U.S. Secretary of the Navy, Benjamin Stoddert re-rated Constellation andbCongress to 38's once he compared the dimensions of the two ships with the also recently completed USF Chesapeake, which had been reduced in size from a 44 to the extent that she was smaller. Other sources, such as Lardas & Bryan, use the official ratings and note, "The U.S. Navy officially carried only three rates of frigate during the period 1794–1826: 44-gun, 36-gun, and 32-gun. The rating was independent of the size of the ship or the weight of its armament, but important in terms of crew size, pay, and money spent to support the ship.")

The "ratings" by number of guns were meant only as an approximation, as Constellation could and often did carry up to 48 guns. U.S. Navy ships of this era had no permanent battery of guns such as modern Navy ships carry. The guns were designed to be completely portable and often were exchanged between ships as situations warranted. Each commanding officer outfitted armaments to his liking, taking into consideration factors such as the overall tonnage of cargo, complement of personnel aboard, and planned routes to be sailed. Consequently, the armaments on ships changed often during their careers, and records of the changes were not generally kept.

=== Officers and crew ===
According to the enabling act, the commissioned officers of the USS Constellation would contain 1 captain, 3 lieutenants, 1 lieutenant of marines, 1 surgeon and 1 surgeon's mate; the warrant officers, appointed by the President of the United States, were 1 sailing master, 1 purser, 1 boatswain, 1 gunner, 1 sailmaker, 1 carpenter, and 8 midshipmen; the complement also contained the following petty officers, appointed by the captain of the ship, 2 master's mates, 1 captain's clerk, 2 boatswain's mates, 1 coxswain, 1 sailmaker's mate, 2 gunner's mates, 1 yeoman of the gunroom, 9 quarter gunners, 2 carpenter's mates, 1 armourer, 1 steward, 1 cooper, 1 master at arms, and 1 cook.

Officers 1798

- Captain: Thomas Truxton
- First Lieutenant: ?
- Second Lieutenant: John Rodgers of Maryland
- Third Lieutenant: William Cooper of Virginia
- Lieutenant of Marines: Philip Edwards of Maryland
- Surgeon: George Balfour of Virginia
- Surgeon's Mate: Isaac Henry of Pennsylvania
- Sailing Master: Edward Hansford of Virginia
- Purser: Isaac Garretson of Maryland
- Midshipmen: Philemon Charles Wederstranett of Maryland, Jabez Bowen, Jr. of Rhode Island, Henry Van Dyke of Delaware, John Dent of Maryland, John Marshall Clajett of Maryland

Monthly Pay of the Petty Officers, Seamen, Ordinary Seamen and Marines in 1798
Rate	Pay per month each	Billets
Midshipman	$19	8
Master's Mate	$20	2
Captain's Clerk	$20	1
Boatswain's Mate	$18	2
Gunner's Mate	$18	2
Yeoman of the Gunroom	$18	1
Quarter Gunner	$17	9
Carpenter's Mate	$18	2
Armourer	$18	1
Steward	$18	1
Cooper	$18	1
Master at Arms	$18	1
Sailmaker's Mate	$17	1
Quarter Master	$17	4
Cook	$18	1
Seaman/Midshipman	$15	126
Ordinary Seaman	$10	90
Sergeant of Marines	$9	2
Corporal of Marines	$8	2
Drummer	$7	1
Fifer	$7	1
Privates	$6	40

== Quasi-War ==
The Quasi-War between France and the States came about when after the French Revolution, the United States refused to repay remaining debt to France on the grounds that it had been owed to the previous regime. French outrage led to a series of attacks on American shipping by privateers. Constellation convoyed American merchantmen from June through August 1798 before sailing under the command of Captain Thomas Truxtun for the West Indies in December 1798 to protect the United States's commerce in the Caribbean.

On 2 February, 1799 she exchanged fire with a French fort at Saint-Pierre, Martinique.

=== Constellation vs. L'Insurgente ===
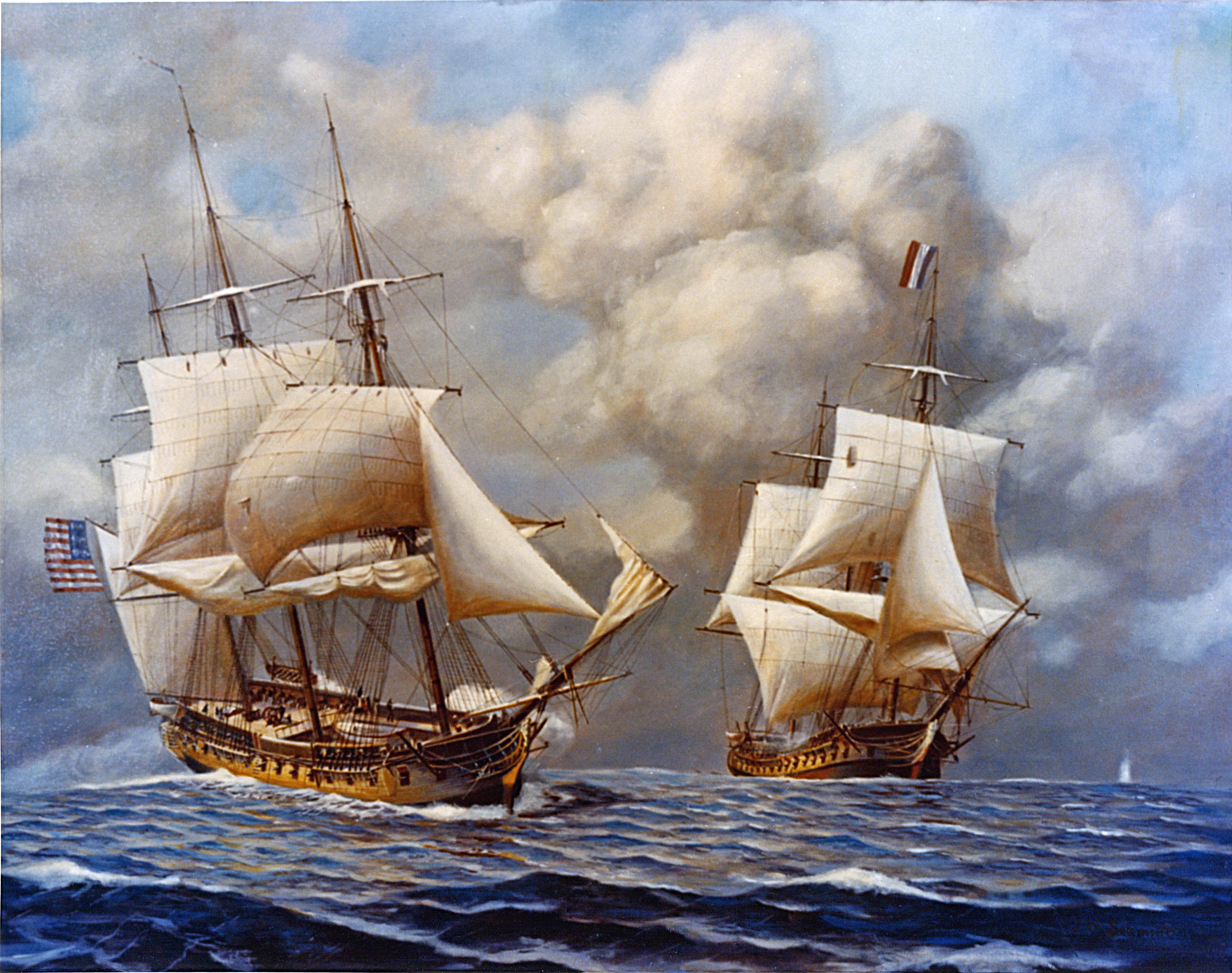
Scene depicting the engagement, with Constellation (left), firing upon the L'Insurgente (right).

On 9 February 1799, under the command of Truxtun, Constellation fought and captured the frigate L'Insurgente of 36 guns, the fastest ship in the French Navy. The battle started about 18 miles (29 km) NE of the island of Nevis about midday when Constellation spotted L'Insurgente, which hoisted studding sails and attempted to run. L'Insurgente had recently captured Retaliation, a schooner, in November 1798 and three weeks previously had been chased by Constitution and had escaped. L'Insurgente's job was that of commerce raiding, wanting nothing to do with another warship, and tried to flee Constellation. Within an hour of hauling in chase Truxtun was close enough to make private signals to identify if the ship he was pursuing was British or not. With no answer, he proceeded to chase L'Insurgente down, clearing for action and beating to quarters. Truxtun made private signals for the U.S. Navy and again received no answer. Constellation crowded on all sail despite a rising squall that threatened to tear a sail or throw a spar.

Reefing sail just long enough to weather the short squall, Constellation hardly paused but the same was not to be for L'Insurgente: the ship's topmast snapped and slowed the ship to the onrushing Constellation. Captain Barreaut ordered L'Insurgente to lay up and prepared to fight. Constellation was outfitted with 24 pounder guns that caused her to lean too much to lee due to topweight and thus had to surrender the weather gage to L'Insurgente. (The ship was refitted with 18-pounder long guns in the next refit.) L'Insurgente raised the French Tricolor and Captain Barreaut asked for parley. Captain Truxtun refused to answer, as his orders were to attack any French warship or privateer, and answered when his last gun could be brought to bear. American warships of this period fired for the hull (as did the British) and each of the 24-pounders had been double shotted. L'Insurgente fired as per training at Constellation's masts and rigging. Constellation's masts were saved when the sail was reduced, taking pressure off the damaged mast. L'Insurgente was devastated by Constellation's first broadside with many dead and others deserting their guns. L'Insurgente tried to board and slowed to close but this allowed Constellation to shoot ahead and crossed bows for a bow rake with another broadside. Constellation crossed to windward and L'Insurgente turned to follow with both crews now exchanging port broadsides instead of starboard. One of Constellation's 24-pounders smashed through the hull of L'Insurgente. L'Insurgente's 12-pounders were not equal to the same task against Constellation's hull. Captain Barreaut had been shown one of Constellation's 24 pound cannonballs and understood that he was in a completely unequal contest with sails down and nothing comparable to reply with many already dead and wounded. He struck colors— the first major victory by an American-designed and built warship.

On 14 March, 1799 she captured the French Letter of Marque schooner Union off Basse-Terre Roads, Guadeloupe.

On 15 April recaptured British merchant Brothers, captured by a French privateer on 14 April.

On 17 April, 1799 she and USS Insurgente captured French letter of marque schooner Diligente off Basse-Terre, Guadeloupe.

She arrived at Hampton Roads 19 May, 1799. She sailed from Chesapeake Bay 30 June, 1799.

After returning from that cruise arriving at Newcastle Delaware on or about 11 October she discharged her crew and began repairs. She departed Hampton Roads on 24 December escorting a stores ship and several merchantmen passing Cape Henry the next day.

=== Constellation vs. La Vengeance ===
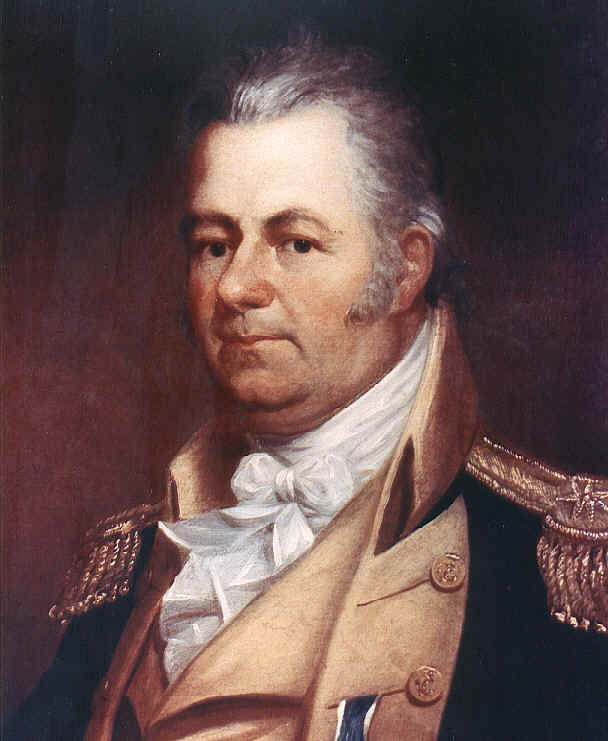
Thomas Truxtun

Constellation sailed under Captain Thomas Truxtun from Saint Kitts on 30 January 1800, and encountered the French frigate La Vengeance, of La Résistance class (design by Pierre Degay, with 30 × 24-pounder guns and 20 × 12-pounder guns) during the night on 1 February 1800. La Vengeance was outweighed by Constellation but had the heavier broadside, 1,165 lb (528 kg) to 744 lb (337 kg). La Vengeance attempted to run and had to be chased down. An hour after sunset Constellation came into hailing range and when La Vengeance was ordered to stand to and surrender, the ship answered with a broadside at (15°17′N 66°04′W). After an hour Constellation's foresails failed and had to be repaired; she then overtook La Vengeance and a running battle exchanging broadsides continued. Twice the ships came close enough that boarders were called for on both ships, the second occasion was quite bloody as U.S. Marines in Constellation shot up the deck of La Vengeance leaving the deck covered in bodies of the dead and wounded, and forcing the boarding party to seek cover. A young lieutenant standing next to Captain Pitot of La Vengeance had his arm taken off at this time. By late in the evening, Constellation was victorious after a five-hour battle. La Vengeance was so holed in the hull and the rigging so cut up that the ship grounded outside the port of Curaçao rather than attempt to sail into port for fear of sinking. The French commander just managed to save his ship from capture by taking advantage of the darkness and – upon returning to port – was so humiliated he later boasted that the American ship he had fought was a much larger and more powerful ship of the line. Despite a heavier broadside Captain Pitot of La Vengeance accounted that they had fired 742 rounds in the engagement while Captain Truxtun of Constellation reported 1,229 rounds expended. Constellation also suffered major damage. She had 13 crew killed, 25 wounded and 1 missing. Her rigging and spars were so damaged that the crew dared not try to sail upwind and so went to Port Royal, Jamaica, arriving on 8 February. She was joined on 5 February by USS Insurgente (17°07′N 67°00′W). Unable to complete a refit she departed Jamaica on 1 March and limped home on a jury rig system while escorting a convoy. After the encounter, Constellation's speed and power inspired the French to nickname her the "Yankee Racehorse." She arrived at Hampton Roads 25 March. By 3 May, 1800 Thomas Truxton had been replaced as Captain by Capt. Alexander Murray. She departed Hampton Roads and was off Cape Henry on 20 May, 1800. She arrived at St. Kitts about 23 June. On 26 June she recaptured ship Minerva that had been captured by a privateer on 25 June. On 2 July she recaptured Danish schooner Charming Betsy that had been captured by a French privateer stating that the Danish captain, still on board, had requested recapture. She arrived at Newcastle, Delaware 10 October, 1800. By 24 December she was anchored off Sandy Hook. She sailed from New York on 9 January, 1801. Sometime in January, 1801, possibly 17 or 18 January, in the night she exchanged fire with HMS Magnanime until identities were established, with the few shots fired doing no material damage being done to either. On 18 January she stopped the French privateer lugger Marrs and found that a Treaty had been signed. Later in the day she recaptured brig Prude, releasing the prize crew to Marrs.

At the end of the Quasi-War with France, Constellation returned to the United States. While anchoring in Delaware Bay on 10 April 1801, she was caught in winds and an ebb tide that ran her aground on a sand bar and laid her over on her beam ends. She was still aground as of 26 April, but refloated by 3 May. She suffered damage requiring extensive repairs at Philadelphia.

== First Barbary War ==
During the United States' preoccupation with France during the Quasi-War, troubles with the Barbary States were suppressed by the payment of tribute to ensure that American merchant ships were not harassed and seized. In 1801 Yusuf Karamanli of Tripoli, dissatisfied with the amount of tribute he was receiving in comparison to Algiers, demanded an immediate payment of $250,000. In response, Thomas Jefferson sent a squadron of frigates to protect American merchant ships in the Mediterranean and pursue peace with the Barbary States.

The first squadron, under the command of Richard Dale in President, was instructed to escort merchant ships through the Mediterranean and negotiate with leaders of the Barbary States.

She left Philadelphia, arriving at Chester on 26 February 1802 to receive her guns, ect. after getting over the bar. She departed New Castle, Delaware on 13 March. Sailing with the squadron of Commodore Richard Morris, and later, with that of Commodores Samuel Barron and John Rodgers, Constellation served in the blockade of Tripoli in May 1802. On 22 July 1802 she exchanged fire with Tripolitan gunboats and troops, reportedly sinking 2 gunboats and killing a general. She received orders to return home on 12 December 1802. She arrived in Chesapeake Bay on 11 March, 1803. She was reactivated following the loss of USS Philadelphia, with Capt. Hugh Campbell in command. She left Eastern Branch on 11 June and arrived at Hampton Roads on 21 June. She left the Capes 5 July, arriving at Gibraltar on 12 August.She cruised widely throughout the Mediterranean in 1804 to show the flag; evacuated in June 1805 a contingent of United States Marines, as well as diplomatic personages, from Derne at the conclusion of a fleet-shore operation against Tripoli; On 30 July she was with the U.S. fleet at Tunis. that culminated in peace terms in August 1805. On 22 August, 1805 Capt. Campbell exchanged commands with Master Commandant Charles Stewart of USS Essex. Constellation returned to the United States in November 1805, mooring at Washington Navy Yard on 29 November, where she was placed in ordinary until 1812.

== War of 1812 ==
Constellation underwent repairs at Washington, D.C., in 1812–1813, and with the advent of the War of 1812 with the United Kingdom, commanded by Captain Charles Stewart, was dispatched to Hampton Roads, Virginia. In January 1813, shortly after arrival, the ship was effectively blockaded by a British squadron of line-of-battle ships and frigates. She kedged up toward Norfolk, and when the tide rose ran in and anchored between the forts; and a few days later dropped down to cover the forts which were being built at Craney Island. Here the ship was exposed to attacks from the British force still lying in Hampton Roads, and, fearing they would attempt to carry her by surprise, Captain Stewart made preparation for defense. The crew anchored in the middle of the narrow channel, flanked by gun-boats, lower ports closed, not a rope left hanging over the sides; the boarding nettings, boiled in half-made pitch till they were as hard as wire, were triced outboard toward the yardarms, and loaded with kentledge to fall on the attacking boats when the tricing lines were cut, while the carronades were loaded to the muzzle with musket balls, and depressed so as to sweep the water near the ship. Twice, a force of British, estimated by their foes to number 2,000 men, started off at night to take Constellation by surprise but on each occasion they were discovered and closely watched by guard-boats, and they never ventured to make the attack.

== Second Barbary War ==
Soon after the United States declared war against Britain in 1812, Algiers took advantage of the United States' preoccupation with Britain and began intercepting American merchant ships in the Mediterranean. On 2 March 1815, at the request of President James Madison, Congress declared war on Algiers. Work preparing two American squadrons promptly began—one at Boston under Commodore William Bainbridge, and one at New York under Commodore Steven Decatur.

Constellation, attached to the Mediterranean Squadron under Commodore Stephen Decatur, sailed from New York on 20 May 1815 and joined in the capture of the Algerian frigate Mashuda on 17 June 1815. Treaties of peace were soon reached with Algiers, Tunis, and Tripoli. Constellation remained with the squadron under Commodores William Bainbridge, Isaac Chauncey, and John Shaw to enforce the accords, returning to Hampton Roads only in December 1817.

== Later career ==
In the spring of 1819 Secretary of the Navy Smith Thompson selected Commodore Oliver Hazard Perry for the mission of establishing friendly relations with the government of newly independent Venezuela and negotiating to obtain restitution for United States schooners Tiger and Liberty that the Venezuelans had illegally taken during the revolution. In 1819, by order of President James Monroe Constellation sailed for the Orinoco River, Venezuela, along with the frigate John Adams and the schooner Nonsuch. Arriving on 15 July, Commodore Perry shifted his flag to Nonsuch and sailed upriver to Angostura to negotiate an anti-piracy agreement. A favorable treaty was signed on 11 August with Vice-president Francisco Antonio Zea, but when the little fleet started downriver, many of the crew including Perry had been stricken with yellow fever.

Despite the efforts to reach Trinidad for medical assistance, the commodore died on his 34th birthday on board John Adams shortly after her arrival at Gulf of Paria on 23 August. He was buried in Port of Spain with great honors while Nonsuch's crew acted as honor guard.

From 12 November 1819 to 24 April 1820, Constellation served as flagship of Commodore Charles Morris on the Brazil Station, protecting American commerce against privateers and supporting the negotiation of trade agreements with South American nations. On 25 July 1820, she sailed for the first time to Pacific waters and arrived in Valparaíso, Chile under Charles G. Ridgeley on January 14, 1821. He was then relieved by Commodore Charles Stewart in April 1822. Constellation remained thus employed for two years, protecting American shipping off the coast of Peru, an area where disquiet erupted into revolt against Spain.

In 1825, Constellation was chosen as flagship for Commodore Lewis Warrington and began duty with the West India Squadron to eradicate waning piracy operations in the Caribbean. During an outbreak of yellow fever at Key West, Florida, Warrington moved the squadron's home port to Pensacola, Florida where a permanent base was established. Other ships operating with Constellation during this period in the West Indies were John Adams, Hornet, Spark, Grampus, Shark, Fox and Decoy. Warrington returned to the United States with Constellation in 1826.

In August 1829, Constellation cruised to the Mediterranean to watch over American shipping and to collect indemnities from previous losses suffered by U.S. merchantmen. While en route to station, the ship carried the American ministers to France and the United Kingdom to their posts of duty. Returning to the United States in November 1831, she underwent minor repairs and departed again for the Mediterranean in April 1832 where she remained until an outbreak of cholera forced her to sail for home in November 1834.

In October 1835, Constellation sailed for the Gulf of Mexico to assist in defeating the Seminole uprising. The crew landed shore parties to relieve the Army garrisons and sent boats on amphibious expeditions. After the mission had been accomplished, they then cruised with the West India Squadron until 1838 serving part of this period in the capacity of flagship for Commodore Alexander Dallas.

The decade of the 1840s saw Constellation circumnavigate the globe. As flagship of Captain Kearny and the East India Squadron, their mission, as assigned in March 1841, was to safeguard American lives and property against loss during the Opium War, and further, to enable negotiation of commercial treaties. En route home in May 1843 she entered the Hawaiian Islands, helping to keep them from becoming a British protectorate, and thereafter sailed homeward making calls at South American ports.

== Fate ==
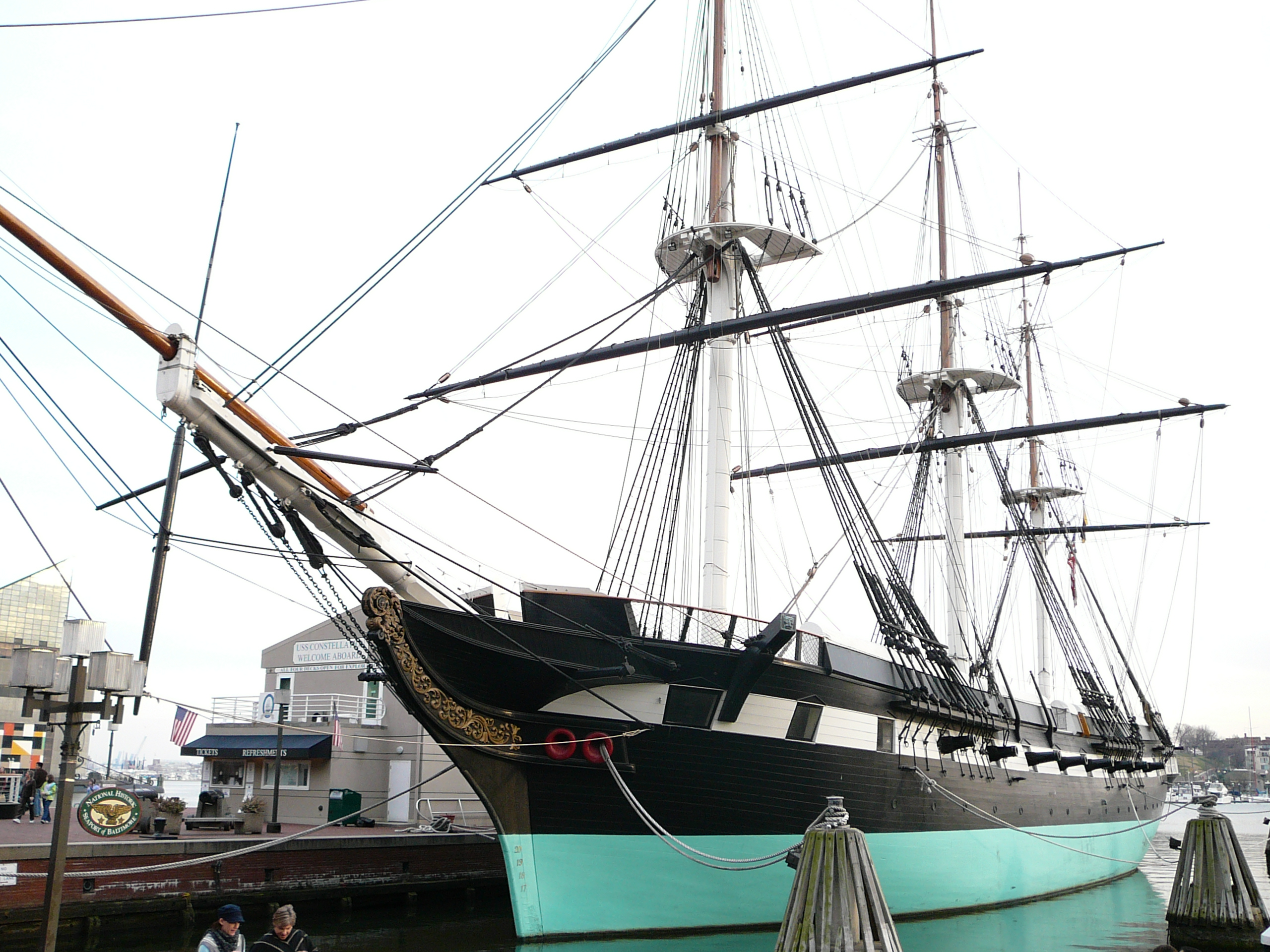
The 1854 Constellation in 2012

In 1853 Constellation was disassembled at the Gosport Navy Yard in Portsmouth, Virginia. At the same time, the keel was laid for what became known as the sloop-of-war USS Constellation (1854). Throughout the 19th and 20th centuries, the United States Congress, the U.S. Navy, and the City of Baltimore continued to identify the ship as the 1854 rebuild of the 1797 ship. In the latter half of the 20th century, however, researchers discovered compelling evidence that the sloop-of-war was a wholly different ship, using only a minimal amount of material from the 1797 frigate.

Commemorative copper coins were struck from parts of Constellation and have become collector's items.

== Bibliography ==
- Allen, Gardner Weld (1905). Our Navy and the Barbary Corsairs. Boston, New York and Chicago: Houghton Mifflin. OCLC 2618279.
- —— (1909). Our Naval War With France. Boston and New York: Houghton Mifflin. OCLC 1202325.
- Beach, Edward L. (1986). The United States Navy 200 Years. New York: H. Holt. ISBN 978-0-03-044711-2. OCLC 12104038.
- Canney, Donald L. (2001). Sailing warships of the US Navy. Annapolis: Naval Institute Press. ISBN 1-55750-990-5. OCLC 49323919.
- Chapelle, Howard Irving (1949). The History of the American Sailing Navy; the Ships and Their Development. New York: Norton. OCLC 1471717.
- Cooper, James Fenimore (1856). History of the Navy of the United States of America. New York: Stringer & Townsend. OCLC 197401914.
- Doane, Rob; Kaurin, Pauline Shanks; Wilson, Evan (October 2024). "The Constellation and the Navy's Culture". Proceedings. 150 (10). Annapolis, Maryland: United States Naval Institute: 73–76.
- Hill, Frederic Stanhope (1905). Twenty-Six Historic Ships. New York and London: G.P. Putnam's Sons. OCLC 1667284.
- Maclay, Edgar Stanton; Smith, Roy Campbell (1898) [1893]. A History of the United States Navy, from 1775 to 1898. Vol. 1 (New ed.). New York: D. Appleton. OCLC 609036.
- —— (1898) [1893]. A History of the United States Navy, from 1775 to 1898. Vol. 2 (New ed.). New York: D. Appleton. OCLC 609036.
- Morris, Charles (1880). Soley, J. R. (ed.). "The Autobiography of Commodore Charles Morris U.S.N." Proceedings of the United States Naval Institute. VI (12). Annapolis: United States Naval Institute: 111–219. ISSN 0041-798X. OCLC 2496995.
- Roosevelt, Theodore (1883) [1882]. The Naval War of 1812 (3rd ed.). New York: G.P. Putnam's sons. OCLC 133902576.
- Toll, Ian W (2006). Six Frigates: The Epic History of the Founding of the US Navy. New York: W. W. Norton. ISBN 978-0-393-05847-5. OCLC 70291925.
- Wegner, Dana M.; Ratliff, Colan D.; Lynaugh, Kevin (September 1991). "Fouled Anchors: The Constellation Question Answered" (PDF). Bethesda: David Taylor Research Center. OCLC 444899959. Archived (PDF) from the original on 25 February 2017.
- Wheeler, Richard (1969). In Pirate Waters. New York: Crowell. OCLC 6144.
