= USS Retaliation (1798) =

Schooner in the late 1790s

History

France
- Name: Croyable
- Builder: Baltimore, Maryland
- Launched: c.1790s
- Fate: Captured 7 July 1798

United States
- Name: USS Retaliation
- Acquired: by purchase, 30 July 1798
- Captured: 20 November 1798
- Fate: Taken into French service

France
- Name: Magicienne
- Acquired: 20 November 1798
- Captured: 28 June 1799

United States
- Name: USS Retaliation
- Acquired: 28 June 1799 by capture
- Fate: Sold, 29 November 1799

General characteristics
- Tons burthen: 100 or 107 (bm)
- Sail plan: Schooner
- Complement: Privateer & U.S. Navy 70 men; US Service: 76 or 87 officers and enlisted
- Armament: Privateer: 12–14 guns; US service: 4 × 6-pounder guns + 10 × 4-pounder guns, or 14x6 pounders; French service: 12 or 14 × 6-pounder guns

USS Retaliation was the French privateer Croyable, built in Maryland, that then operated out of Santo Domingo. Delaware captured her on 7 July 1798 off New Jersey. She then served in the United States Navy during Quasi-War with France. Two French frigates recaptured her on 20 November 1798. The French Navy took her into service as Magicienne. However, Merrimack captured her on 28 June 1799. She served in the US Navy in the Caribbean briefly, before arriving in Philadelphia in August. She was paid off (decommissioned) there and sold on 29 November.

== Career ==
The U.S. warship Delaware, commanded by Capt. Stephen Decatur Sr., was able to capture the French privateer, Croyable, off Great Egg Harbor Bay, New Jersey, on 7 July 1798. Before her capture, Croyable had been preying upon shipping off the Delaware Capes and had taken a British brigantine and a Philadelphia merchantman, Liberty. She had also boarded and robbed the coaster Alexander Hamilton, whose captain had informed Decatur of Croyable's whereabouts. Decatur brought Croyable to Fort Mifflin in the Delaware River. She was the first American capture of the undeclared war.

The U.S. Navy purchased Croyable on 30 July 1798, manned her at Philadelphia, renamed her Retaliation, and placed her under the command of Lt. William Bainbridge.

Retaliation departed Norfolk on 28 October 1798 with Montezuma and Norfolk and cruised in the West Indies protecting American commerce during the Quasi-War with France. On 20 November the squadron recaptured merchantman "Fair American", taken 5 days earlier by a French privateer, but before being able to make their escape with the merchantman a pair of French frigates, Insurgente and Volontaire, overtook Retaliation while her consorts were away on a chase and forced Bainbridge to surrender the hopelessly out-gunned schooner. However, even as a prisoner, Bainbridge managed to save both the Montezuma and Norfolk by convincing the senior French commander that those American warships were too powerful for his frigates and induced him to abandon their chase.

Renamed Magicienne by the French, the schooner again came into American hands on 28 June 1799, when a broadside from USS Merrimack forced her to haul down her colors. She performed convoy duty in the Caribbean before returning to Philadelphia in August. Her crew was then discharged and the schooner was sold on 29 November 1799 to Thomas and Peter Mackie.

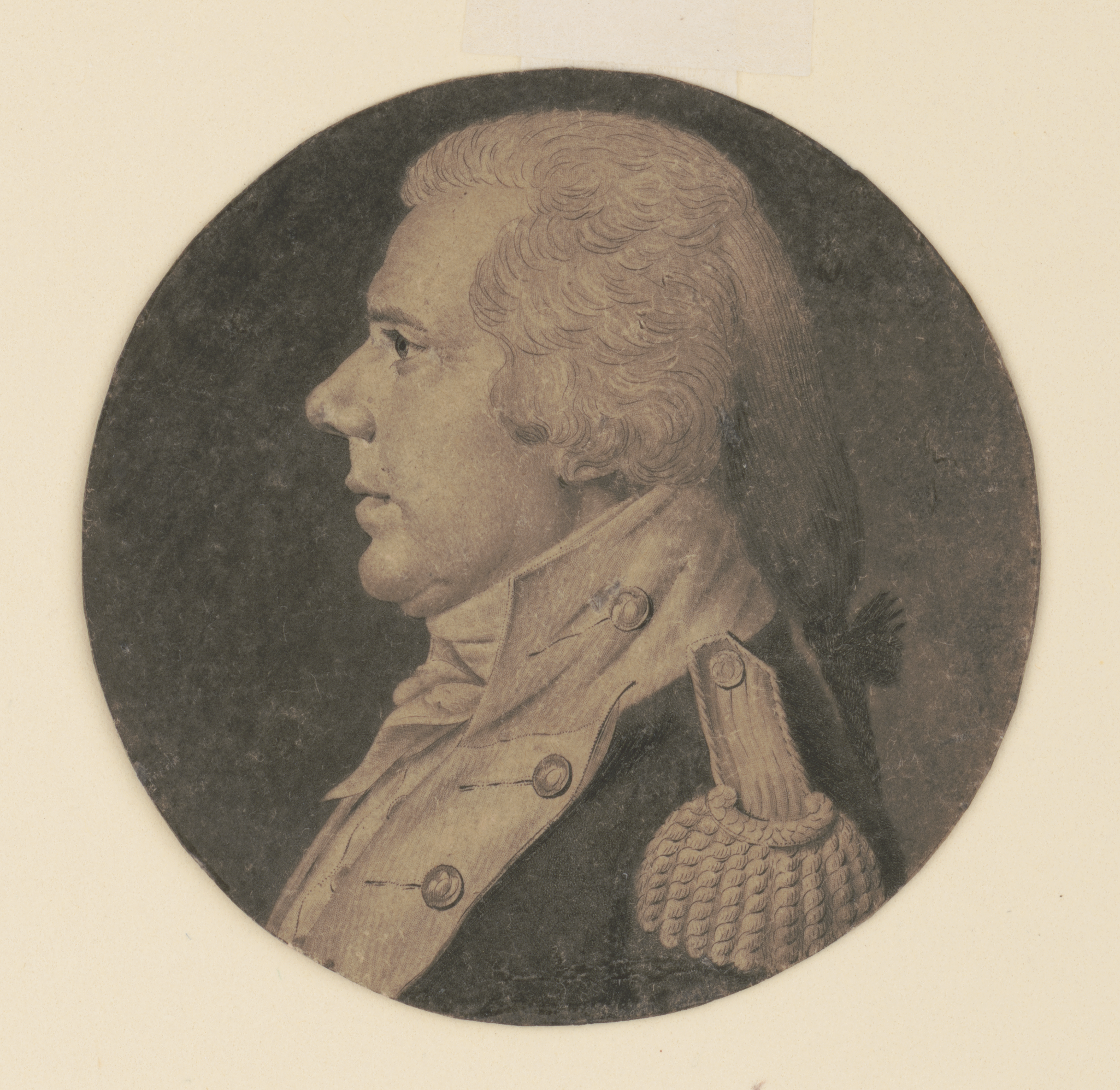
Captain Stephen Decatur Sr

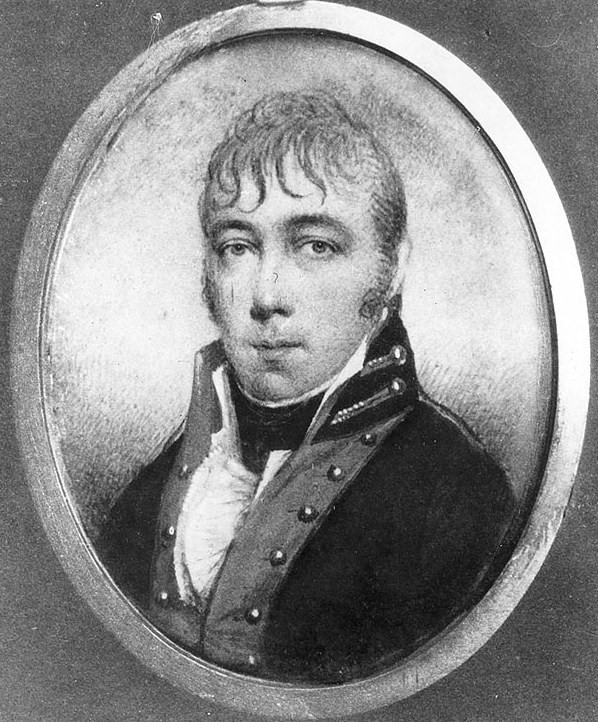
William Bainbridge Lieutenant, United States Navy, commanded the USS Retaliation in 1798.
