= Thomas Truxtun =

United States Navy officer (1755–1822)

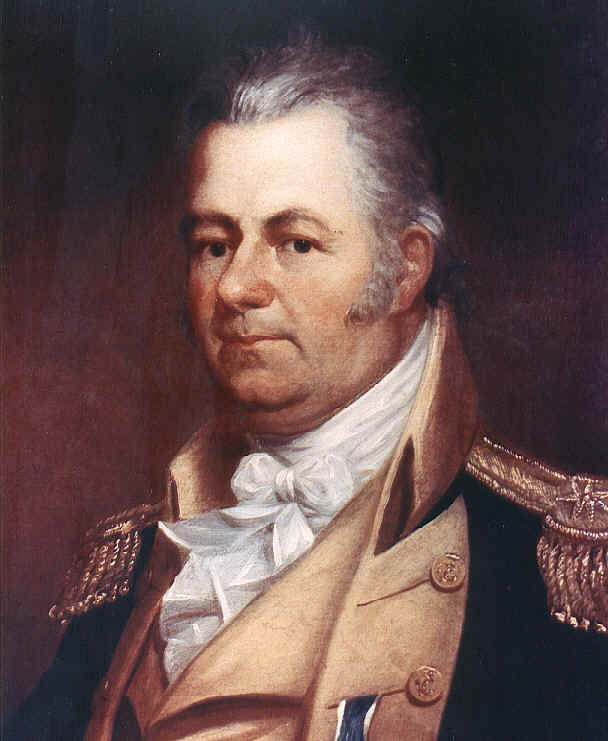
- Portrait by Bass Otis, 1817
- Born: February 17, 1755; Hempstead, New York, British America
- Died: May 5, 1822 (aged 67); Philadelphia, Pennsylvania, U.S.
- Burial place: Christ Church Burial Ground; Philadelphia, Pennsylvania
- Military career
- Allegiance: United States
- Branch: United States Navy
- Service years: 1794–1801
- Rank: Commodore
- Commands: USS Constellation; USS President
- Conflicts: American Revolutionary War; Quasi-War

Commodore Thomas Truxtun (February 17, 1755 – May 5, 1822) was a United States Navy officer and politician. During the American Revolutionary War, he served as a privateer. Truxtun eventually rose to the rank of Commodore in the late eighteenth century and later served in the Quasi-War with France. He was one of the first six commanders appointed to the new U.S. Navy by President George Washington. During his naval career he commanded a number of famous U.S. naval ships, including USS Constellation and USS President. Later in civilian life he became involved with politics and was also elected as a sheriff. Six U.S. Navy warships have been named for Truxtun since 1842.

== Early life and education ==
Truxtun was born near Hempstead, Province of New York on Long Island, the only son of an English-born lawyer. He lost his father at a young age and was taken to Jamaica on Long Island with relatives and placed under the care of a close friend, John Troup. Having little chance for a formal education, he joined the crew of the British merchant ship Pitt at the age of 12, against his father's previous wishes for him to pursue a career in politics.

== Naval service ==
Because of his skills, by the time he was twenty, Truxtun became the sea captain of the merchantman Andrew Caldwell. Before the outbreak of the American Revolutionary War he was impressed onto a Royal Navy ship and was offered a midshipman's commission, which he turned down.

After being wounded in action against an American privateer, he left the navy and joined the Patriot cause. He then operated as an American privateer during the American Revolutionary War, commanding several ships: Congress, Independence, Mars, and St. James. Truxtun captured several British ships during the conflict.

After the war he returned to the merchant marine, with a high reputation as a seaman. He was the author of a treatise on longitude and latitude, of a "System of masting a 44-gun frigate," and was an advocate for the foundation of a national navy. He remained in the marine for 12 years. In 1786 he commanded Canton, operating from Philadelphia, one of the first American ships to engage in trade with China. When the United States Navy was reconstituted in 1798 he was one of the original corps of six captains.

== Quasi-War ==
In 1794 and the war with France looming, Truxtun was one of the first six captains appointed by President Washington in the newly formed US Navy. During the Quasi-War with France, Truxtun commanded USS Constellation. For his first assignment he had previously overseen her construction in Baltimore, Maryland, with Silas Talbot. After a rank dispute with captains Dale and Talbot, Truxtun was placed in charge of the ship by President Washington. He commanded her with considerable success.

=== Constellation engages L'Insurgente ===
In the early years of the new nation, American commerce suffered much interference from other seafaring nations, and it was during this period that Truxtun gave celebrated service to the navy. First, because of constant French privateering attacks against American vessels, an American squadron commanded by Truxtun was sent to the West Indies to patrol the waters between Puerto Rico and Saint Kitts with orders to engage any French forces they found in the area. Also on board was the young and later famous John Rodgers, acting 1st Lieutenant. On 9 February 1799, while sailing independently of his squadron in his flagship Constellation, Truxtun encountered and engaged the French frigate L'Insurgente, a larger and more heavily armed vessel commanded by Captaine Barreau. After chasing the French ship through a storm, Constellation was able to force L'Insurgente into an engagement that lasted an hour and fourteen minutes. Barreau did not strike his colors until his ship was almost a complete wreck. French losses were 29 killed and 44 wounded, while Truxtun's crew only suffered one killed and two wounded. It was the first battle engagement since the Revolutionary War that an American ship had encountered an enemy ship.

=== Constellation engages La Vengeance ===
On 31 January 1800, Constellation engaged La Vengeance, a larger vessel with a broadside of 559 pounds (254 kg) compared to Constellation's 372 pounds (169 kg). (Note: The French naval historian Onésime-Joachim Troude reports La Vengeances armament as twenty-six 18 pounders (8.2 kg), ten 6 pounders (2.7 kg), and four 36-pounder (16 kg) carronades, a 336-pound (152 kg) broadside, compared to Constellation's twenty-eight 18 pounders (8.2 kg), ten 12 pounders (5.4 kg), and one 32-pounder (15 kg) carronade, a 472-pound (214 kg) broadside.) Constellation had sailed under Truxtun from Saint Kitts on 30 January, and encountered La Vengeance the following day. La Vengeance was bound for France under Capitaine de Vaisseau François Pitot carrying passengers and specie, and initially attempted to outrun Constellation. During the battle Constellation was partially dismasted and was forced to make her way to Jamaica. Thirty six hours after the engagement with La Vengeance, while passing the eastern end of Puerto Rico, Enterprise, commanded by Lieutenant Commander Shaw, arrived and fell in with Truxtun. After a short fall in Truxtun sent Enterprise to Philadelphia with important dispatches.

Truxtun's victory against La Vengeance made him a hero of the time; when he arrived home he was awarded a Congressional Gold Medal on 29 March 1800, becoming the eighth recipient of that body's "highest expression of national appreciation for distinguished achievements and contributions."

== Command of USS President ==
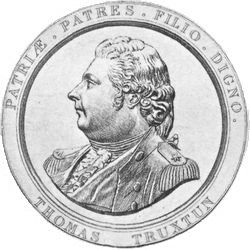

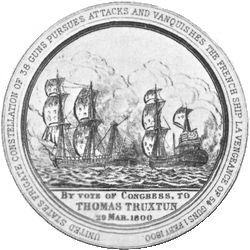
Etching of Truxtun's Congressional Gold Medal

USS President was launched on 10 April 1800 and, at the time, was considered America's fastest sailing ship. She was the last of the original six frigates launched. After the vessel was fitted out for sea duty, she set sail for Guadeloupe on 5 August with Captain Truxtun in command, relieving Stephen Decatur. She conducted routine patrols during the latter part of the Quasi-War and recaptured several American merchant ships; however, her overall service in this period was uneventful. She returned to the United States in March after a peace treaty with France was ratified on 3 February 1801.

During this period, Truxtun was involved in a dispute over rank with Richard Dale. Truxtun took command of President for a few months in 1800. On 15 April 1801 he wrote the Acting Secretary of the Navy proposing increased work assignments for Marines stationed on ships, and more control by ship's Captains over assignment of Marine Officers to their ships, or the abolishment of the United States Marine Corps if greater authority couldn't be granted. The proposal was rejected in a 28 June 1801 letter sent to Capt. Silas Talbot. He retired from the Navy and located first in Perth Amboy, New Jersey, and later in Philadelphia. He was ordered to take command of USS Chesapeake on 12 January 1802 by the Secretary of the Navy. He proposed that he should be squadron commander of the new squadron leaving for the Mediterranean, or he should leave the service, in a letter to Secretary of the Navy dated 3 March 1802. Secretary of the Navy ordered Capt. Richard V. Morris to take command of Chesapeake in a letter dated 11 March 1802. He was relieved of command by the Navy Secretary in a letter dated 13 March with Lt. William Smith taking temporary command of USS Chesapeake.

== Writer ==
Truxtun had a thorough understanding of the art of celestial navigation and was one among few men of his day who possessed such intimate knowledge of this navigational art. He also designed the original Navy signal manual and wrote the predecessor to the Navy Regulations in use today.

== Later civilian life ==
Truxtun ran an unsuccessful campaign for the United States House of Representatives in 1810. In 1816 he was elected sheriff of Philadelphia County, serving until 1819. He also published several books, well known at the time, covering navigation, and naval tactics.

Truxtun died in Philadelphia on 5 May 1822 and is buried at Christ Church Burial Ground. He was the grandfather of American historian Mary Henderson Eastman. as well as naval officer Edward Fitzgerald "Ned" Beale, who became a national figure in the 19th century as an explorer, frontiersman, Indian affairs superintendent, California rancher, and close friend of Kit Carson and President Ulysses S. Grant.

== Legacy and honors ==
- Six U.S. Navy ships have been named in Truxtun's honor.
- The town of Truxton, New York, was named for him.
- Truxton Street in Brooklyn, New York.
- The village of Truxton, Missouri, was named after Thomas Truxtun.
- Washington, D.C. once had a traffic circle, Truxton Circle, named after him. Even after its demolition, the nearby neighborhood has retained his name.
- Truxtun, in Portsmouth, Virginia, one of the first federally funded planned communities in America, was named for him. It was built shortly after World War I for African-American workers at Norfolk Naval Shipyard.
- Truxtun Arcade at the United States Merchant Marine Academy is named in honor of the American Merchant Mariner turned Naval Hero Thomas Truxtun.

== See also ==
- List of sea captains
- List of ships captured in the 19th century
- Bibliography of early American naval history
- Truxton Bowl

== Bibliography ==
- Allen, Gardner Weld (1909). Our naval war with France. Boston, New York and Chicago: Houghton Mifflin & Co.
- Canney, Donald L. (2001). Sailing warships of the US Navy. Chatham Publishing / Naval Institute Press. ISBN 1-55750-990-5.
- Cooper, James Fenimore (1846). Lives of Distinguished American Naval Officers. Vol. 1. Philadelphia: Carey and Hart. OCLC 620356.
- Frost, John (1845). The pictorial book of the commodores: comprising lives of distinguished commanders in the navy of the United States. New York: Nafis and Cornish. ISBN 1-55750-839-9.
- Guttridge, Leonard F. (2006). Our Country, Right Or Wrong: The Life of Stephen Decatur. New York, NY: Tom Doherty Associates, LLC. ISBN 978-0-7653-0702-6.
- Hattendorf, John B. (2011). "XII The Formation and Roles of the Continental Navy, 1775–1785". Talking About Naval History: A Collection of Essays. Newport: Naval War College Press. ISBN 9781884733741.
- Harrison, Henry William (1858). Battlefields and naval exploits of the United States: ... H. C. Peck & Theo. Bliss, Philadelphia. p. 448.
- Loubat, Joseph Florimond (1881). The medallic history of the United States of America, 1776–1876. Vol. 1. Author/Loubat, New York.
- McBride, James (1815). Naval biography consisting of memoirs of the most distinguished officers of the American navy; to which is annexed the life of General Pike. Morgan, Williams & Co., Cincinnati.
- Roosevelt, Theodore (1883). The naval war of 1812. New York: G.P. Putnam's sons.
- Seawell, Molly Elliot (1898). Twelve naval captains: being a record of certain Americans who made themselves immortal. London: Kegan, Paul, Trench, Trubner, & Co. Ltd.
- Toll, Ian W. (2006). Six frigates: the epic history of the founding of the U.S. Navy. New York: W. W. Norton & Company. ISBN 978-0-393-05847-5.

=== Further reading ===
- Ferguson, Eugene S. (1956). Truxtun of the Constellation:The Life of Commodore Thomas Truxtun, U.S. Navy, 1755–1822. Johns Hopkins University Press. ISBN 0801865972. – Dated, but still the best biography of Truxtun in print.
- Fowler, William M. (1900). Silas Talbot: Captain of Old Ironsides. Mystic Seaport Museum. p. 231. ISBN 9780913372739.
- Grant, Bruce (1930). Captain of the Constellation: Commodore Thomas Truxtun. New York: Putnam.
- Statham, Edward Phillips (1910). Privateers and privateering. With eight illustrations. New York: Hutchinson & Co. / James Pott & Co. p. 382.
- Truxtun, Thomas (1809). Biographical Memoirs of Thomas Truxtun, ESQ. from the Port Folio. Bradford & Inskeep.
- Tuckerman, Henry (2009). The Life of Silas Talbot. Bedford, Mass.: Applewood Books. p. 148. ISBN 9781429021593.
