= Salusbury Pryce Humphreys =

Rear-Admiral Sir Salusbury Pryce Humphreys KCH CB
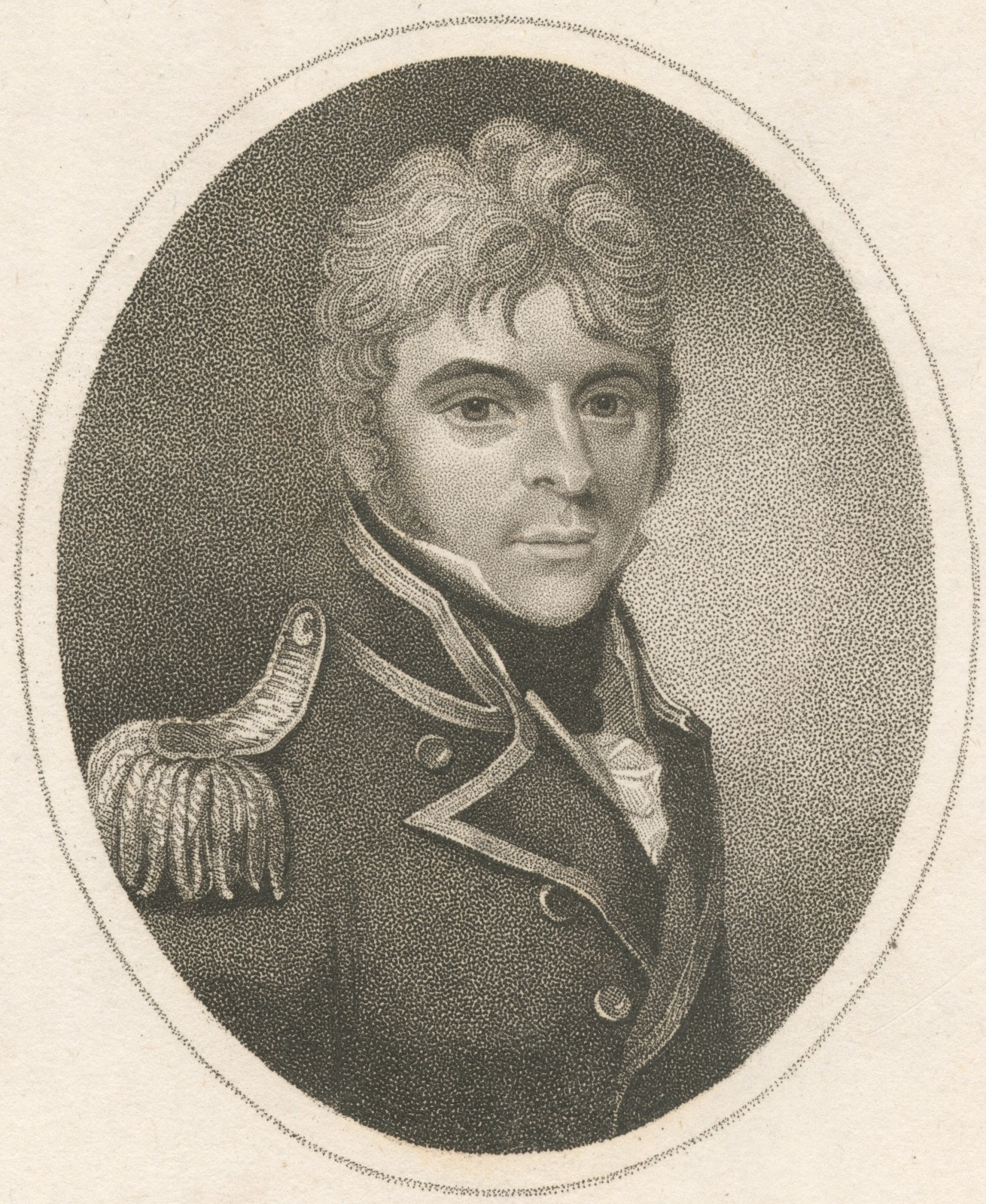
- 1812 portrait
- Born: 24 November 1778; Clungunford, Shropshire
- Died: 17 November 1845 (aged 66); Cheltenham, Gloucestershire
- Burial place: Leckhampton, Gloucestershire
- Military career
- Allegiance: Great Britain; United Kingdom
- Branch: Royal Navy
- Service years: 1790–1845
- Rank: Rear admiral
- Commands: HMS Prospero; HMS Leander; HMS Leopard
- Awards: Companion of the Order of the Bath; Knight Commander of the Royal Guelphic Order

Rear-Admiral Sir Salusbury Pryce Davenport KCH CB (born Salusbury Pryce Humphreys; 24 November 1778 – 17 November 1845) was a Royal Navy officer who served in the French Revolutionary and Napoleonic Wars.

He entered the navy during the Nootka Crisis in 1790 and served aboard a number of ships, starting at the level of able seaman and rising through the ranks, having reached midshipman on the outbreak of the French Revolutionary Wars. A lieutenancy followed while serving in the Caribbean, where he acted in support of army operations against enemy colonies and islands, before his return to Britain. He was afterwards employed in the English Channel and North Sea, where he distinguished himself on a cutting out expedition off the Dutch island of Schiermonnikoog, narrowly escaping death when a ship he tried and failed to board suddenly exploded. After again supporting land operations, this time in Holland, he was promoted to commander though he had to then wait two years for a command.

Promotion to post-captain soon followed, and he went to North America to command the flagship of the admiral in command there. Desertion from Royal Navy ships had become a pressing issue and Humphreys, by then in command of the 50-gun HMS Leopard, was ordered to intercept the USS Chesapeake, which was suspected to have several deserters as part of her crew. Humphreys did so, and requested permission to search her. Chesapeake's captain refused, so Humphreys fired upon her, the poorly prepared American ship surrendered and Humphreys took off several British deserters. The backlash from the Chesapeake-Leopard Affair, as it became known as, was severe. A political crisis was precipitated between the governments of Britain and the United States, and to mollify the Americans, Humphreys was given no further commands. He was already wealthy, having married an heiress, and settling at the estates of Bramall Hall. He was promoted to rear admiral in 1837, and then restored on the active lists, having changed his surname to Davenport in 1838 on the occasion of his wife's inheritance. He died in 1845.

== Family and early life ==
Salusbury Pryce Humphreys was born at Clungunford Rectory, Shropshire, on 24 November 1778, the third son of Reverend Evan Humphreys and his wife Mary. He entered the navy on 1 July 1790, during the Spanish Armament, serving as a volunteer aboard the 64-gun HMS Ardent, which was then under the command of Captain James Vashon. He was next aboard the 50-gun HMS Trusty, the flagship of Rear Admiral Sir John Laforey in the Leeward Islands, followed by a posting to the 32-gun HMS Solebay, commanded by Captain Matthew Squire. He was rated as able seaman during this last posting, after which he was moved to the 14-gun HMS Fairy, commanded by Captain Francis Laforey. His next ship was the 50-gun HMS Severn, under Captain Paul Minchin, where he was rated as midshipman some time before the outbreak of war with Revolutionary France in February 1793. Severn conveyed the Governor General of Canada, Lord Dorchester, and his family and suite, to Quebec, returning to Britain in 1794. Humphreys followed Minchin to his next command, the 38-gun HMS Hebe, and went out to the West Indies. While serving there, Humphreys was ordered to act as lieutenant of the 14-gun HMS Fury under Captain Henry Evans in April 1796.

Humphreys was next in action supporting the army under Sir Ralph Abercromby at the siege of Saint Lucia, and afterwards convoyed the despatches concerning the attack on Porto Rico back to Britain. His promotion to lieutenant came on 17 January 1797, together with an appointment to the armed ship Sally, serving in the North Sea under Captain George Wolfe. In 1798 he received a posting to the 32-gun HMS Juno, also in the North Sea, under the command of Captain George Dundas.

=== Cutting out expedition ===
In August 1798 Humphreys was sent with some of Juno's men to support a cutting out expedition led by Captain Adam Mackenzie of HMS Pylades off the island of Schiermonnikoog. In an action on 11 August British boats succeeded in attacking and capturing the gunboat Crash, and preparing an operation to capture a large Dutch schooner, named Vengeance, anchored under the protection of a battery on the island, Mackenzie sent Humphreys and another lieutenant to capture some schuyts on 12 August.^{[a]} They captured two, burning one and sailing the other back to the British flotilla. Mackenzie armed the captured schuyt with 12-pounder carronades and named her Undaunted, placing Humphreys in command. Mackenzie launched his attack on the Dutch schooner and battery the following day, 13 August. Crash was supposed to have covered Humphreys in Undaunted, but she ran aground. Undaunted, Humphreys pushed on, coming alongside the Dutch schooner just as she was abandoned by her crew. The strong tide meant that he could not maintain his station alongside the Dutch vessel, and the roundness of her sides prevented him from leaping aboard. Instead he took a rope and jumped into the sea, hoping to be able to swim to the ship, board her and attach a rope. Once in the water he found that he could make little headway against the tide, and had to be hauled back on board. He had just regained the deck of Undaunted when Vengeance exploded, her crew having set a fuse to the ship's magazine before they abandoned her. Meanwhile, the rest of the flotilla successfully stormed the Dutch battery and spiked its guns. None of the attacking force was killed or wounded in the operation.

After the Anglo-Russian invasion of Holland in August 1799 Humphreys left Juno and moved to the 50-gun HMS Isis, which was then the flagship of Vice-Admiral Sir Andrew Mitchell with the Channel Fleet. He followed Mitchell to HMS Babet, serving on the Zuiderzee during the operations in Holland, and was then aboard HMS Stag, assigned to a squadron under Captain Henry Inman of HMS Andromeda, which carried out an attack on 7 July 1800 against four French frigates anchored at Dunkirk. Humphreys moved again with Mitchell to the 90-gun HMS Windsor Castle in 1800, and while serving aboard her, received a promotion to commander, on 29 April 1802.

== Command ==
Despite his promotion, Humphreys had to wait nearly two years before receiving his own command, until finally appointed to the bomb vessel HMS Prospero at Portsmouth in January 1804. His time in command was short, as on 8 May he was promoted to post captain. He married Jane Elizabeth Morin in March 1805, the couple having one son together. Humphreys went out to Halifax the following year to take command of the 50-gun HMS Leander, the flagship of the station commander Vice-Admiral George Berkeley. He assumed command on his arrival in May, but it was then decided to send Leander back to Britain, and Humphreys was instead transferred to the 50-gun HMS Leopard in October. Berkeley preferred to live onshore, meaning that for much of the time Leopard acted as a private ship.

=== The Chesapeake–Leopard affair ===
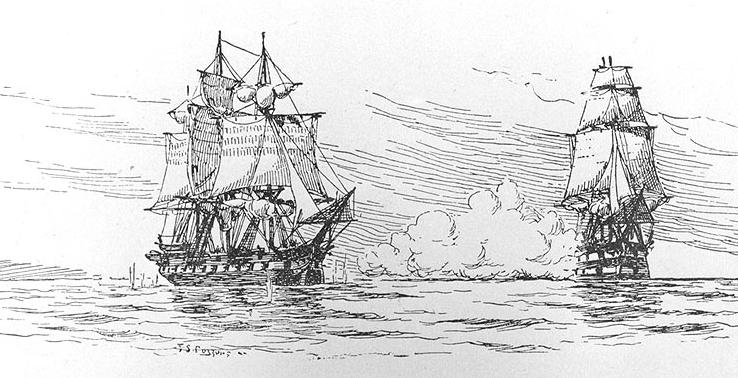
The Chesapeake–Leopard affair. HMS Leopard (right) fires on USS Chesapeake.

The Royal Navy had been having significant problems with men deserting their ships whilst in American ports, and then joining ships of the US Navy. Berkeley had been made aware of deserters from several ships who had joined the crew of the heavy frigate USS Chesapeake, and on 1 June 1807 he issued an order that Chesapeake be stopped at sea and searched for deserters.^{[b]} Apprehending them in town proved impossible as the men were under the protection of the magistrates. Berkeley directed that in return, the American captain was permitted to search British vessels for American deserters. Sent to enforce Berkeley's order, Captain Humphreys located Chesapeake off Norfolk, Virginia on 22 June and sent a lieutenant across to request permission to search her. Chesapeake's commander, Commodore James Barron, refused to allow this and ordered his men to prepare for an action. Faced with Barron's refusal, Humphreys bore up and opened fire on her, hitting her with several broadsides. The unprepared Chesapeake fired a single shot in reply, and then struck her colours. Humphreys sent a party across to search the ship, and found four deserters, Daniel Martin, John Strachan, and William Ware, run from HMS Melampus; and Jenkin Ratford, run from HMS Halifax.^{[c]} They were taken aboard Leopard, which then departed, Humphreys having refused to accept Barron's offer to consider Chesapeake a prize. Chesapeake had three men killed, eight men badly wounded, and ten slightly wounded.

Though his conduct was approved of by Berkeley, it caused outrage amongst the Americans and became a major political incident. Anxious to appease the Americans, an Order in Council was issued, banning the use of force against foreign warships, Berkeley was recalled and Humphreys too found himself a victim of political movements. He returned to Britain in 1808 and was not offered any further commands. He was given the title of rear admiral in 1837.

== Life ashore ==
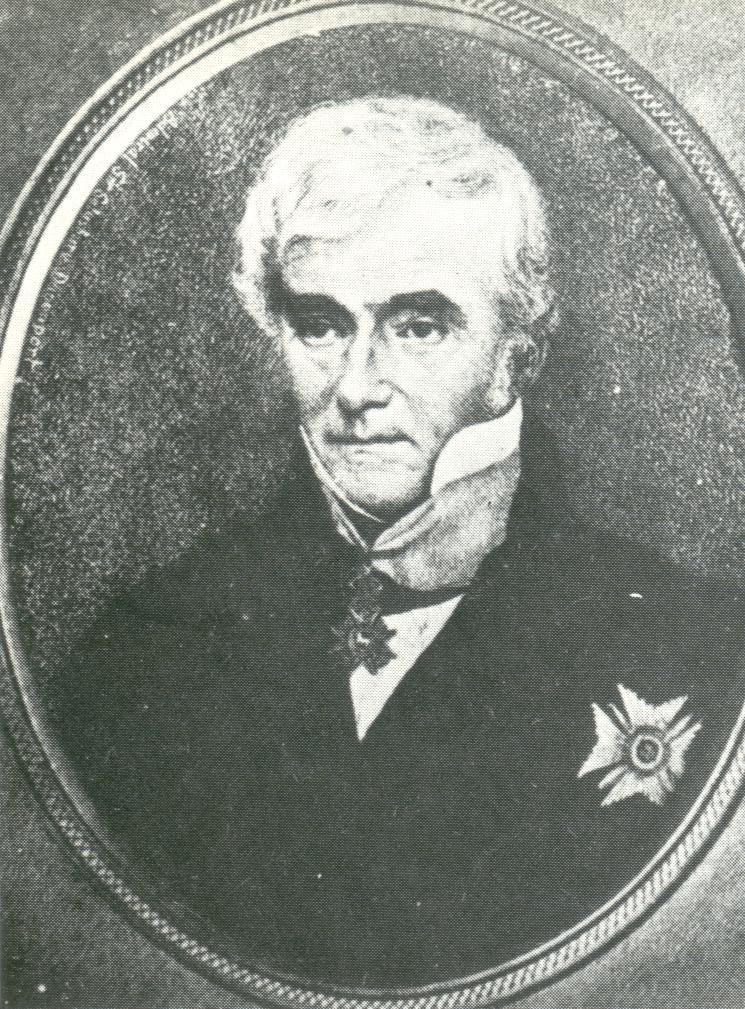
Rear Admiral Sir Salusbury Davenport in later life

Humphreys spent the remainder of the war ashore on half-pay, finding occupation in civil duties, serving as a Justice of the Peace for Buckingham, Chester and Lancaster. His wife Jane died in September 1808, and Humphreys remarried on 31 May 1810, to Maria Davenport, of Bramall Hall. The couple had five sons and two daughters together.

After the wars had ended he was put on the list of superannuated captains, but achieved some recompense when he was made a Companion of the Bath on 26 September 1831, on the occasion of King William IV's Coronation Honours. He received a further honour when he was nominated a Knight Commander of the Guelphic Order of Hanover in February 1834, and was promoted to rear admiral on 10 January 1837. He assumed the surname of Davenport when his wife inherited the Davenport estates at Bramall in 1838, and was restored to the active list on 17 August 1840. He settled at Bramall and had become widely respected in the Stockport area prior to his wife's inheritance, but following his succession to the estate there were disputes from other members of the Davenport family who claimed a right to the property. He moved with Maria to Cheltenham in 1841, most likely because living at Bramall had become expensive or because of health concerns. He died there on 17 November 1845 at the age of sixty-six and was buried in Leckhampton.

== See also ==
- O'Byrne, William Richard (1849). "Davenport, Salusbury Pryce" . A Naval Biographical Dictionary . John Murray – via Wikisource.

== Notes ==
a. Crash was a former British ship, which had run aground off Vlieland on 26 August 1797 and was captured by the Dutch.

b. Among the ships Berkeley reported that men had run from were the 74-gun ships HMS Bellona, HMS Belleisle and HMS Triumph, the store-ship HMS Chichester, the sloop HMS Halifax and the cutter HMS Zenobia.

c. Ratford, the only British citizen of the four, was executed. The remaining three were American citizens and were sentenced to 500 lashes each, though this was later commuted.
