= Adam Mackenzie =

Royal Navy officer (c.1760s–1823)

- Born: c.1760s
- Died: 13 November 1823
- Burial place: Stoke, Staffordshire
- Military career
- Allegiance: Great Britain; United Kingdom
- Branch: Royal Navy
- Service years: c.1778–1823
- Rank: Captain
- Commands: HMS Pylades; HMS Brilliant; HMS Magicienne; HMS Prince of Wales; HMS President; HMS Armada; HMS Creole; HMS Superb
- Conflicts: American Revolutionary War; Battle of Ushant; Battle of Grenada; Battle of Cape St. Vincent; Battle of Martinique; Relief of Gibraltar; French Revolutionary Wars; Glorious First of June; Napoleonic Wars; Battle of San Domingo; Battle of Copenhagen
- Awards: Order of the Tower and Sword

Captain Adam Mackenzie (died 13 November 1823) was a Royal Navy officer who served in the American, French Revolutionary and Napoleonic Wars, being present at numerous fleet actions, as well as serving as successful ship captain.

== Biography ==
=== Early career ===
Mackenzie was present as a midshipman in several actions between the British and French during the American War: under Augustus Keppel at Ushant in 1778; under John Byron at Grenada in 1779; under Rodney at Cape St. Vincent and Martinique in 1780; and the relief of Gibraltar under Earl Howe in 1782. He was eventually commissioned as a lieutenant on 3 March 1790, and was present as the first lieutenant of the frigate Southampton at the Glorious First of June in 1794.

=== HMS Pylades ===
Promoted to commander on 22 June 1796, he appointed to command of the 16-gun sloop Pylades. In May 1797 he was sent by the Port Admiral at Sheerness to negotiate with the mutineers at the Nore, and also assisted in securing the dockyard from any attempt by the mutineers to capture it.

Pylades was then stationed principally off the Dutch coast, where Mackenzie greatly distinguished himself.

- In July 1797 he recaptured the Thetis, Ocean, John, and Swan.
- In April and May 1798 he captured the fishing vessels Staadt Altona and De Hoop.
- On 27 March 1799 he captured the Noyt Gedacht and Goode Hoop.
- On 12 May 1799 Pylades and Ranger captured the Vrow Etje.
- Pylades was part of a squadron led by Captain Frank Sotheron in the frigate Latona, composed of the frigate Astraea, the brig-sloop Cruizer, the sloops Ranger and Busy, the hired cutters Courier, Fox and Diligent, and the hired lugger Speculator, that captured six Dutch ships between March and May 1799. Pylades received a share of the prize money paid for three of them; Vinnern (5 May), Jonge Picter (7 May) and Ferwagting (14 May), but after deductions for the cases of six other ships (presumably disallowed by the prize court), Mackenzie's share came to only £31 13s 0d.
- On 10 July 1799, he led an attack by boats near the island of Ameland, bringing out three valuable merchantmen, and burnt a galliot, loaded with ordnance stores.

Mackenzie's most notable action during this time took place on 11 August 1799, when Pylades, accompanied by the 14-gun sloop Espiegle, under Captain James Boorder, and the 12-gun hired cutter Courier, under Lieutenant Thomas Searle, reinforced with men and boats from the frigates Latona and Juno, were sent to recapture the Crash, a former British gun-brig, which lay moored between the island of Schiermonnikoog and the mainland of Groningen. The Courier, faster and smaller than her companions, was sent ahead to engage the Crash, despite being heavily outgunned, with Courier mounting only twelve 4-pounder guns, while Crash was armed with eight 18-pounders, two 24-pounders and two 32-pounders, all carronades. Sailing into the wind in the narrow and shallow channel delayed the arrival of Pylades and Espiegle, however they eventually arrived to within pistol-shot of Crash, which surrendered after a determined resistance. At the same time the boats of Pylades, Latona and Juno pursued a large armed schooner, forcing her to run ashore to avoid capture, before capturing a schuyt. Lieutenant James Slade of the Latona was given command of Crash, and Lieutenant Salusbury Pryce Humphreys of Juno that of the schuyt, which Mackenzie armed with two 12-pounder carronades and named Undaunted.

Two days later, on the afternoon of the 13th, the British returned to attack a shore battery of six guns on Schiermonnikoog, and the schooner Vengeance, armed with two long 24-pounders, four guns of smaller calibre, and 70 men, which was lying with a large row-boat, and several merchant vessels, near the island. Crash and Undaunted, accompanied by the launches of the Latona and Pylades, each mounting a 12-pounder carronade, and several smaller boats armed with swivels and muskets, all under the command of Lieutenant Slade, approached to attack. Unfortunately, Crash grounded too far out to aid to Lieutenant Humphreys in Undaunted, who steered towards the Vengeance, arriving alongside just after her crew had abandoned her. The strong tide, and the tumblehome of both ships prevented Humphreys jumping aboard, so he attempted to swim across with a rope, but was defeated by the strong current and was hauled back to the Undaunted. This was fortunate, for he had only just returned to his own ship when the Vengeance exploded, her crew having left a fuze burning in the magazine. In the meantime the boats had landed on Schiermonnikoog, captured the battery and spiked the guns. Assisted by Undaunted they then brought off two brass field pieces, the row-boat, and twelve schuyts. In 1847 the Admiralty authorised the issue to the surviving claimants of the Naval General Service Medal with clasp "Schiermonnikoog 12 Augt. 1799".

=== Frigate captain ===
Mackenzie was then present at the capture of the Dutch fleet of Vice-Admiral Samuel Story on 30 August 1799, and was promoted to post-captain on 2 September. He remained on half-pay until October 1801, when was appointed to the 28-gun Brilliant, commanding her until March 1802, when the Treaty of Amiens brought a temporary peace.

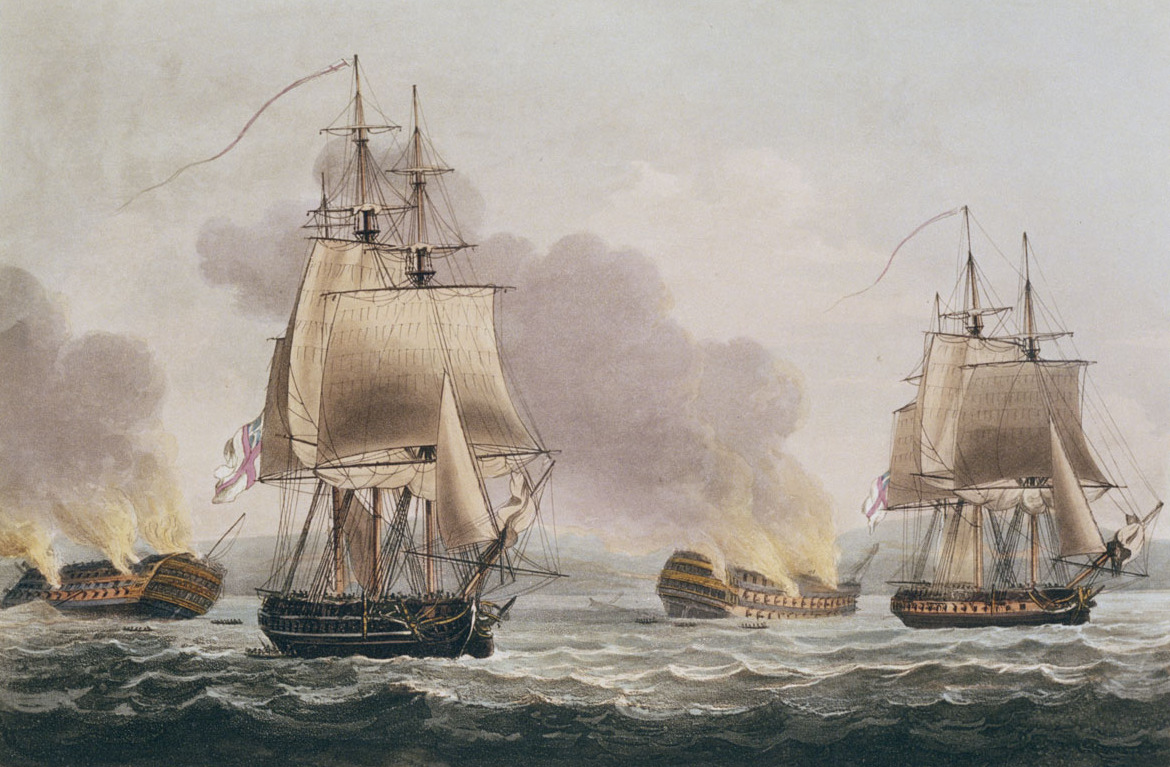
"Acasta and Magicienne at the Battle of San Domingo" by Thomas Whitcombe.

At the renewal of the war in May 1803, Mackenzie was given command of the frigate Magicienne, and was employed in the blockade of the enemy's coast into the following year. He then escorted vessels taking 10 troops of horse and 1,000 infantry to the West Indies, where he had several skirmishes with the enemy's batteries, and destroyed many vessels. On 25 January 1806, in the Mona Passage, Magicienne and the sloop Penguin captured the Spanish packet El Carmen after a chase lasting 12 hours. The Spaniard was pierced for 14 guns, but mounted only two, and had a crew of 18 men. Magicienne also formed part of the squadron under Sir John T. Duckworth at the Battle of San Domingo on 6 February 1806. Mackenzie was subsequently ordered to escort a convoy from Jamaica to England. Soon after leaving the Gulf of Mexico, a hurricane struck, sinking twenty vessels, and obliging him to sail for Bermuda to repair damage.

=== Ship of the line ===
In 1807 Mackenzie was 2nd Captain of the Prince of Wales, the flagship of Admiral James Gambier, at the Battle of Copenhagen. On his return he was appointed to the frigate President, and soon after ordered to Brazil; from where Sir W. Sidney Smith sent him to negotiate with the Viceroy of Buenos Aires Santiago de Liniers for the opening of the South American ports to English commerce. On his return, he served under Rear-Admiral Michael de Courcy, who sent his ship to Rio de Janeiro, to attend upon and afford protection to the Portuguese royal family. Before his departure, Mackenzie received the insignia of the Portuguese Order of the Tower and Sword. From August 1810 until January 1812 he commanded the 74-gun Armada in the Channel and North Sea.

=== Post-war career ===
On 13 May 1820, Mackenzie was appointed to command of the frigate Creole, and in January 1821 to the ship Superb to serve on the coast of South America. He rounded Cape Horn into the Pacific a few months later, during the southern winter, to protect British interests and property during the Wars of Independence. Superb was stationed as a guard ship at Plymouth by mid-1822.

=== Death ===
Mackenzie died in November 1823 and was buried at Stoke, his funeral attended by over 300 sailors and Royal Marines. The event was controversial, as after his death a woman had emerged claiming to be Mackenzie's secret wife and laying claim to his inheritance. The local vicar, Mr. Ley, carried out an investigation and determined that the woman had once been a mistress of Captain Mackenzie. Upon the end of their relationship she had conducted a marriage with a shipwright named George Condy, who had posed as Captain Mackenzie. Condy was confronted about the accusations and committed suicide, while the woman was arrested for attempting to fraudulently lay claim to Mackenzie's military pension.
