= Hired armed cutter Courier =

British cutter

His Majesty's hired armed cutter Courier appears twice in the records of the British Royal Navy. The size and armament suggests that both contracts could represent the same vessel, but other information indicates that the second Courier had been captured from the French in the West Indies. On the first contract the captain and crew were awarded clasps to the Naval General Service Medal, one for a boat action and one for a single ship action in which they distinguished themselves.

== First contract ==
The first contract for Courier was from 6 June 1798 to 1 November 1801. She was of 11638/94 tons (bm) and carried an armament of twelve 4-pounder guns. She had a crew of 40 men.

In 1799 she was under the command of Lieutenant Thomas Searle, in the North Sea. On 15 April he recaptured the Nelly from the French privateer Vengeur. On 16 April, Courier was in company with Latona, Astraea and Cruizer when they captured the Prussian hoy Dolphin.

Then on 2 May, Ranger, with Courier in company, captured Vreeda. (Note: The prize money for an Able Seaman was £1 14s 1d.)

On 12 May, while off Winterton on the coast of Norfolk, Courier engaged a French 16-gun privateer. The French brig was attacking a British merchant sloop when Courier intervened. The brig was armed with 16 guns, mixed 6 and 9-pounders. After an hour and forty minutes of fighting, the privateer chose to take advantage of the wind and her better sailing qualities and escaped in the darkness and thick weather. Courier tried to chase her but lost her after midnight. Courier had five men wounded in the action. Latona and Ranger assisted in the action.

The next day Courier captured the French brig's consort, the privateer schooner Ribotteur, off the Texel. Ribotteur had a crew of 26 men and was pierced for six guns but carried four 3-pounders, having thrown two overboard during the chase. Ribotteur did not resist. (Note: On 15 February 1800 prize and head money resulting from the capture of Rebotteur was due for payment.) During the action Courier observed another privateer, a lugger, in the distance, that remained aloof from the action.

On 26 June Courier and Circe captured Twee Gesisters.

On 1 July, Courier captured the brig Frederick. (Note: On 7 Apr 1801 an advance of prize money was due for the capture of Frederick.) Then on 10 July Courier was a part of a small squadron consisting of Circe, Pylades, Espiegle, and the hired armed cutter Nancy, all under the command of Captain R. Winthrop of Circe. The boats of the squadron rowed for 15 or 16 hours into the Watt at the back of Ameland. There they captured three merchant vessels carrying sugar, wine, and brandy, and destroyed a galliot loaded with ordnance and stores.

Between 18 July and 1 August, Courier, Circe, Pylades, Espiegle, and Nancy captured Marguerita Sophia, Twee Gesister, Twee Gebroders (Master, Vink) Twee Gebroders (Master, Nolholt), Jussrow Maria Christina, Vrow Henterje Marguaritha, Stadt Oldenburg, Vrow Antje, Vrow Gesina, Endraght, and Frederick. (Note: The prize money to an able seaman on Courier for these vessels plus the June Twee Gesister, amounted to £3 17s 6d. This would have amounted to about a month's wages.)

Between 11 and 12 August, Pylades, a 16-gun sloop under the command of Adam Mackenzie, accompanied by the 16-gun brig-sloop Espiegle, and Courier, attacked the former British gun-brig Crash, moored between the island of Schiermonnikoog and Groningen. Courier started the action, which resulted in Crash surrendering after the two sloops joined in. Pylades lost one man killed and two wounded. Crash had a crew of 60 men and was armed with 12 carronades. The British also captured a schooner, which MacKenzie armed with two carronades and named Undaunted. The boats of the squadron, now including boats and men from Latona and Juno, then attacked the 6-gun Dutch schooner Vengeance and a battery on Schiermonnikoog. The British were able to burn the schooner on the second attempt and to spike the guns of the battery. The squadron's boats also captured a number of Dutch schuyts. During the attack Courier grounded and was only saved with some difficulty. (Note: On 31 March 1801 prize money for the vessels captured at Shiermonnikoog was due to be paid. The vessels were the galliot Vier Vendou, Crash, Waarwrick, galliot Jonge Gessina, and a galliot of unknown name.) In 1847 the Admiralty authorized the issue to the surviving claimants of the Naval General Service Medal with clasp "Schiermonnikoog 12 Augt. 1799".

Latona, Astrea, Cruizer, Pylades, Ranger, Busy, Courier, hired armed lugger Speculator, and the hired armed cutters Fox and Diligent captured Aeolus, Jonge Picter , Vrow Alyda, Verwagting, Vinnern, and Almindeligheden. The same British vessels were also involved in the capture of Neptunus, Sen Soskende, Bornholm, Fabius, Zee Star, and Frou Eagle. (Note: This time the prize money for a seaman on Courier was only 1s 9¼d.)

On 21 November, Courier sailed from Yarmouth and on the afternoon of the following day saw a suspicious sail stopping a bark. Searle passed the bark, which reported that the other vessel was an enemy. Courier gave chase and came up with her the next morning 10 or 12 leagues off Lowestoft. After a close action of 50 minutes Courier captured the French privateer cutter Guerrier. Guerrier carried fourteen 4-pounder guns, had a crew of 44 men, and was commanded by Citizen Felix L. Sallemand. During her five days out of Dunkirk she had captured Nile, a brig from London carrying coal. Courier lost her master, Mr Stephen Marsh, who was killed at the start of the action, and also had two seamen wounded. The French had four killed and six wounded. Searle later received a promotion to Commander dated 23 November. (Note: On 24 May 1800 prize and head money due from the capture of Guerrier was due for payment.) In 1847 the Admiralty authorized the issuance of the Naval General Service Medal with clasp "Courier 23 Novr. 1799" for this action.

In December 1800 Courier was obliged to quit her station between the Humber and Flamborough Head after an action with a French privateer a few days earlier.

== Second contract ==
The contract for this Courier was from 23 July 1804 to 18 August 1806. She was a cutter of 11457/94 tons burthen and carried twelve 4-pounder guns.

Her commander throughout the contract was Lieutenant James Boxer. Courier served off Boulogne, Ushant and Rochester. At the end of her contract she was returned to her owners.

On 12 December 1804 Courier was with the hired armed cutter Countess of Elgin and the hired armed schooner Charlotte, when they recaptured the ship New Concord. (Note: The total net prize money available for distribution for New Concord was £74 4s 10d.) Then on 2 September 1805, Courier alone captured the French schooner Angelique.

During the second half of 1805, Courier returned to the Downs in a battered state after having engaged a shore battery. While on patrol, she had recovered a warship's boat, together with a lieutenant and 16 men. Shortly thereafter she spotted a French privateer lugger sheltering under the protection of a shore battery. Courier attempted to cut out the lugger but came under fire from the battery's 24-pounders and a 12-pounder field piece on shore. Because of the shallowness of the water and the lack of wind, Courier was unable to proceed further. Having sustained serious damage she gave up the attempt. During the action Lieutenant Nainby from the sloop Megaera was killed, as were two other men, and one man was wounded. (Presumably the men that Courier had earlier recovered were from Megaera).

== Letters of marque ==
Three letters of marque were issued to a ship or ships named Courier. The first may have been the same vessel as the first contract hired armed cutter Courier. The second and third letters of marque appear to have been issued to the same vessel, which however was neither the first letter of marque nor the hired armed cutter of the second contract above. For all three letters below, the vessel is described as being armed with twelve 3-pounders.

- Of 12 guns and 122 tons burthen, Arthur Threlful, master; letter of marque dated 22 November 1798.
- Of 12 guns and 106 tons burthen, William Adamson, master; letter of marque dated 3 November 1804.
- Of 12 guns and 106 tons burthen, Thomas Pratt, master; letter of marque dated 22 February 1805.
