= James Smith Barron =

American politician (1875–1941)

Member of the Virginia Senate for Norfolk City, Virginia
- In office January 9, 1924 – January 12, 1932 Serving with John A. Lesner
- Preceded by: position created
- Succeeded by: John W. Eggleston

Personal details
- Born: December 3, 1875 Warsaw, Richmond County, Virginia
- Died: January 12, 1941 (aged 65) Princess Anne County, Virginia
- Spouse: Catherine Massie Ryan
- Children: son and daughter
- Relatives
- Education: College of William & Mary; University of Virginia School of Law
- Occupation: lawyer, politician

James Smith Barron (December 3, 1875 – January 12, 1941) was a lawyer and politician aligned with the Democratic Party who represented Norfolk City for two terms in the Virginia Senate.

== Early life and education ==
Born in Warsaw (the county seat of Richmond County) in 1875, to the former Agnes Muse Smith (1846–1914) and her husband Samuel Barron (1836–1892), who had served as a Confederate naval lieutenant and clerk for his father Samuel Barron (1809–1888) before becoming a farmer in the Northern Neck of Virginia (where his father died during this boy's youth). That grandfather had held the rank of commodore in the Confederate Navy as well as in the United States Navy, and had continued the family's long history of naval service as well as overseeing shipbuilding. Two earlier generations of men had been shared the same name as well as long careers as U.S. Naval officers. This man's great-grandfather, commodore Samuel Barron (1765–1810) had served in the Revolutionary War under his father, as well as in the First Barbary War before commanding the Gosport Navy Yard in Portsmouth in Virginia's Hampton Roads area, and his younger brother had been James Barron who was notorious for killing Stephen Decatur in a duel, but whose long U.S. Navy career included command of several famous ships as well as of the Gosport Navy Yard and Philadelphia Navy Yard. Their father, Captain James Barron was a merchant captain before serving as commodore of the Virginia State Navy in the Revolutionary War, and his brother Captain Richard Barron had also served in that conflict (after jointly established a shipyard in Elizabeth City County). Their father (this man's great-great-great-grandfather) was Captain Samuel Barron, who had defended Old Point Comfort until a hurricane in 1749 undermined the fort (but he was able to evacuate the garrison and their families).

In addition to an elder brother named Samuel Barron Jr. (or V) (1874–1903) and a younger brother Armistead B. Barron (1879–1912), his family included sisters Sallie H. Barron, Imogen Barron Denny (1875–1955), and Agnes Newton Barron Segar (1876–1948). In 1892, their father moved the family to Norfolk, where he opened a ship brokerage firm Samuel Barron & Co., but soon died. Nonetheless, this boy was educated at William & Mary College nearby in Williamsburg, then traveled to Charlottesville where he studied law at the University of Virginia School of Law, receiving an LLB. degree in 1902. While at the University of Virginia, Barron was president of his senior law class and of the Jefferson Literary Society, as well as participated in Kappa Sigma and Phi Delta Phi.

== Career ==
Admitted to the Virginia State bar, Barron established a private legal practice in Norfolk and was president of the Norfolk-Portsmouth Bar Association. He also served as a justice of the peace of the police court in 1912–1914. Barron participated in Democratic politics and attended at least two Democratic National Conventions. In one he helped notify New York Governor Al Smith as the party's nominee. Barron also participated in Democratic National Convention in Chicago in 1932 that nominated Franklin Delano Roosevelt.

Norfolk voters elected him and John A. Lesner as their representatives in the state senate in 1924, as the city's growth had added a second position in the 2nd district. Barron sponsored the Virginia Anti-Lynching Act, and also was a leader of the fight against the 18th Amendment (Prohibition) and later for its repeal. His successor in the Virginia Senate, John W. Eggleston would later become Chief Justice of the Virginia Supreme Court.

== Personal life ==
Barron married Catherine Massie Ryan (1886–1963) of Virginia Beach to the south in Princess Anne County, Virginia, who survived him by two decades. The couple had a son (James Smith Barron Jr.) and a daughter (Sally Chilton Barron).

== Death and legacy ==
Barron died aged 65 at his home in Princess Anne County, after an illness of three weeks.
