= Senator Corbett (disambiguation) =

Henry W. Corbett (1827–1903) was a U.S. Senator from Oregon from 1867 to 1873. Senator Corbett may also refer to:

- Alfred H. Corbett (1915–2000), Oregon State Senate
- Danny Corbett (1949–2016), Alabama State Senate
- Ellen Corbett (1954–2024), California State Senate
- Henry L. Corbett (1881–1957), Oregon State Senate

== See also ==
- Leo Corbet (1936–2019), Arizona State Senate
- William C. Corbitt (1854–1922), Virginia State Senate
