= James Barron =

United States Navy officer (1768–1851)

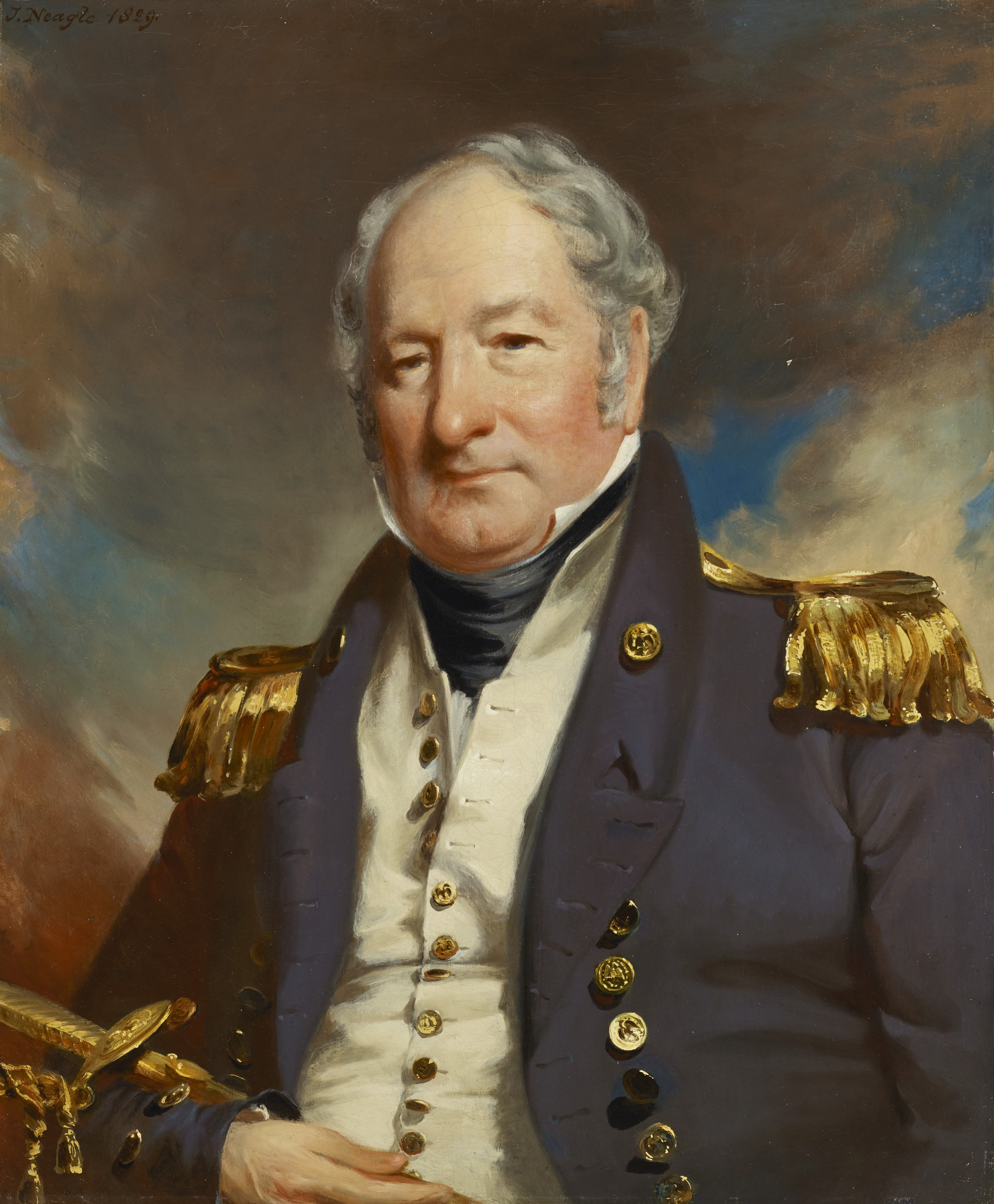
- Portrait by John B. Neagle, 1829
- Born: September 15, 1768; Hampton, Virginia, British America
- Died: April 21, 1851 (aged 82); Norfolk, Virginia, US
- Burial place: Trinity Episcopal Church Cemetery, Portsmouth, Virginia, US
- Military career
- Allegiance: United States
- Branch: United States Navy
- Service years: 1798–1851
- Rank: Commodore
- Commands: USS Warren; USS Essex; USS President; USS Chesapeake
- Conflicts: Quasi-War; First Barbary War

Commodore James Barron (September 15, 1768 – April 21, 1851) was a United States Navy officer. (Note: He was the younger brother of Samuel Barron, who was also a naval officer.) He served in the Quasi-War and the Barbary Wars, during which he commanded a number of famous ships, including USS Essex and USS President. As commander of the frigate USS Chesapeake, in 1807 he was involved in the Chesapeake–Leopard affair, which led to the surrender of his ship to the British and resulted in his court-martial for his actions during the incident. After criticism from some fellow officers, the resulting controversy led Barron to a pistol duel with one of the officers who had presided over his court-martial, Stephen Decatur, resulting in Decatur's death. Suspended from command for failure to prepare the Chesapeake for battle, he pursued commercial interests in Europe during the War of 1812. Barron finished his naval career on shore duty, becoming the Navy's senior officer in 1839.

== Early life ==
Barron was born in Hampton, Virginia in 1768, the son of a merchant captain named James Barron who became Commodore of the tiny Virginia State Navy during the American Revolution, and fought with distinction defending not only Hampton but also Charleston, South Carolina. His grandfather Samuel Barron commanded the fort at Old Point Comfort, built to defend the town but which was destroyed during a hurricane in 1749. Capt. Barron saved the entire garrison and their families, before establishing a residence for his family across Mill Creek. This boy's father and his brother (this boy's uncle) Richard Barron owned considerable property in Hampton and established a shipyard which built ships for the Virginia Navy. His elder brother Samuel Barron served in the Virginia navy during the American Revolutionary War, then joined the U.S. Navy.

== Military career ==
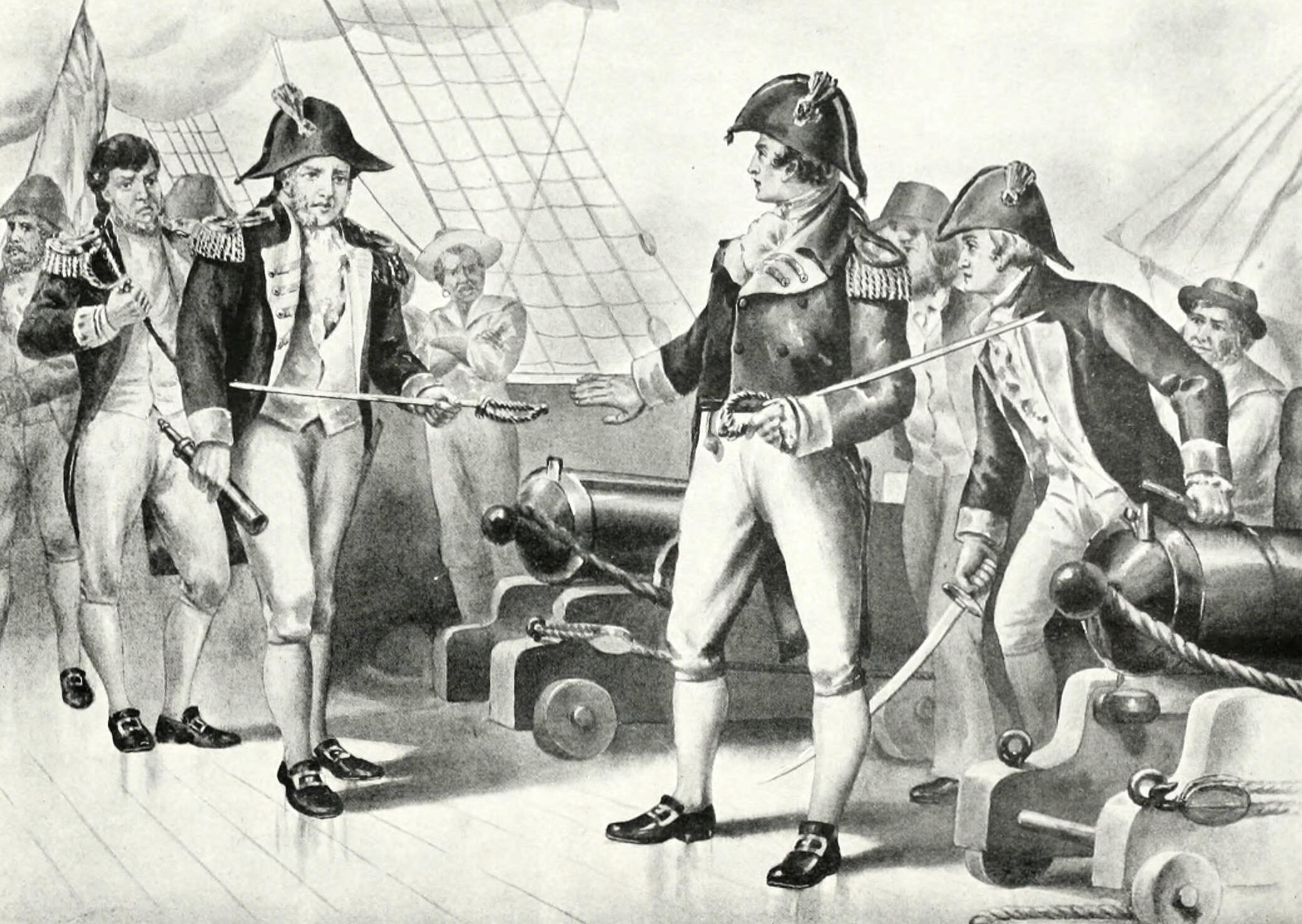
Barron surrendering his sword to Salusbury Pryce Humphreys during the Chesapeake–Leopard affair

As a boy, Barron apprenticed on his father's ships for several years, and on March 9, 1798, he was commissioned in the newly created United States Navy as a lieutenant. He served aboard the frigate United States under John Barry. For his exceptional ability and service Barron was promoted to captain in 1799. He commanded the sloop-of-war Warren during the final months of the Quasi-War with France.

=== Barbary wars ===
In a letter dated 13 August 1802 Barron was ordered to take command of USS New York at the Washington Navy Yard.

Early in 1804 Barron supervised the building of gunboats at Hampton, Virginia. During the First Barbary War, Barron was given command of USS Essex on April 11, 1804, and sailed to the Mediterranean to serve in the squadron commanded by his brother, Commodore Samuel Barron, protecting American merchantmen and blockading the Tripolian harbor until May 22, 1805. Health problems caused him to relinquish command of the squadron to Commodore John Rodgers.

On June 25, 1805, Barron, along with Stephen Decatur and others, presided over the court of inquiry, held aboard USS Constitution at Syracuse, which looked into William Bainbridge's grounding and loss of USS Philadelphia near Tripoli's harbor.

On April 15, 1806, Barron was appointed to command the Mediterranean Squadron. Promoted to the rank of commodore on April 22, he was assigned command of the frigate USS Chesapeake the following year. Chesapeake was berthed at Norfolk and was being outfitted for her upcoming mission in great haste, with a green crew and equipment that was below standards.

Commodore Barron and the Chesapeake on June 22, 1807, became involved in the Chesapeake–Leopard affair. The Royal Navy ship of the line HMS Leopard hailed his frigate outside of Hampton Roads and asked to search for British deserters. Barron refused, and Leopard then opened fire on Chesapeake, killing three crewmen and wounding eighteen. Caught completely unprepared for battle, Barron struck his colours, acknowledging defeat. A boarding party from Leopard boarded his ship and removed four deserters.

In January 1808, a court-martial was held. Barron was convicted of not preparing his ship in advance for possible action, and suspended for five years without pay. John Rodgers was the president of the court-martial, and Stephen Decatur was a member.

=== Duel between Barron and Decatur ===
After being away for six years, Barron finally returned from Copenhagen seeking reinstatement, but he remained controversial and was criticized by some of his fellow officers. Commodore Stephen Decatur, a former subordinate, was one of the most vocal. Embittered towards Decatur, Barron challenged him to a duel with pistols, which they fought on March 22, 1820.

Barron's challenge to Decatur occurred during a period when duels between officers were so common that it was creating a shortage of experienced officers, forcing the War Department to threaten to discharge those who attempted to pursue the practice.

Bainbridge and Jesse Elliott arranged the duel in such a way that made the wounding or death of both duelists very likely. The duelists would be standing face to face in proximity to each other; there would be no back-to-back pacing away and turning to fire, the practice of which often resulted in the missing of one's opponent. After taking their places Barron and Decatur were instructed by Bainbridge, "I shall give the word quickly – 'Present, one, two, three' – You are neither to fire before the word 'one', nor after the word 'three'." Now in their positions, each duelist raised his pistol, cocked the flintlock and waited for the call. When Bainbridge then called out, 'One', Decatur and Barron both fired before the count of 'two'. Decatur's shot hit Barron in the lower abdomen and ricocheted into his thigh. Barron's shot hit Decatur in the pelvic area, severing arteries. Both duelists fell almost at the same instant. Decatur, mortally wounded, clutched his side and exclaimed, "Oh, Lord, I am a dead man." Also lying wounded, Commodore Barron proclaimed that the duel was carried out properly and honorably, and told Decatur that he forgave him from the bottom of his heart. Decatur died from his wounds at approximately 10:30 pm that night while Barron survived his.

== Personal life ==
Barron married Mary Ann Wilson, and they had two daughters. His eldest daughter, Jane, married Wilton Hope, and became the mother of lawyer, Confederate officer and poet James Barron Hope, the official poet of the Jamestown 250 celebration, and later first commander of the Pickett-Buchanan camp of the United Confederate veterans. In 1830, this man's household included three slaves, one man and two women.

== Later service, death and legacy ==
Following the War of 1812, Barron was restored to duty, and in 1820 was placed in command of the Philadelphia Navy Yard. He also had the honor or receiving General LaFayette during his return visit in 1824. Barron remained in the Navy on shore duty, including commands at various times of the Gosport Naval Yard and Philadelphia naval asylum, and became the Navy's senior officer in 1839.

He died in Norfolk, Virginia, on April 21, 1851 and was buried at historic Trinity Episcopal Church cemetery in Portsmouth. His widow survived him for decades and would be buried at the city's Cedar Grove cemetery in 1884. His personal papers, which primarily relate to the Chesapeake–Leopard affair, can be found in the Special Collections Research Center at the College of William & Mary. A distant relation born 25 years after his death and the son of Samuel Barron IV, James Smith Barron may have been named in his honor, and while he did not pursue a naval career (becoming a lawyer instead) became the only man of the family to serve in the Virginia General Assembly, twice winning elections to represent Norfolk in the Virginia Senate.

== See also ==
- Bibliography of early American naval history
- List of naval battles in the American Revolution
- List of single-ship actions
- Glossary of nautical terms (A-L)
- Glossary of nautical terms (M-Z)

== Bibliography ==
- Allen, Gardner Weld (1905). Our Navy and the Barbary Corsairs.
  Houghton Mifflin & Co., Boston, New York and Chicago. p. 354. OCLC 2618279. Url
- Guttridge, Leonard F (2005). Our Country, Right Or Wrong: The Life of Stephen Decatur.
  Tom Doherty Associates, LLC, New York, NY, 2006. p. 304. ISBN 978-0-7653-0702-6. Url
- Harris, Thomas (1837). The life and services of Commodore William Bainbridge, United States navy.
  Carey Lea & Blanchard, Philadelphia. p. 254. ISBN 978-0-945726-58-6. Url1 Url2
- Heidler, David Stephen; Heidler, Jean (2004). Encyclopedia of the War of 1812.
  Naval Institute Press, Annapolis, Md., 2004. p. 636. ISBN 1-59114-362-4. Url
- Hickey, Donal R. (1989). The War of 1812, A Forgotten Conflict.
  University of Illinois Press, Chicago and Urbana. ISBN 0-252-01613-0. Url
- Lewis, Charles Lee (2004). The Romantic Decatur.
  Ayer Publishing, 1937. p. 296. ISBN 0-8369-5898-5. Url
- Mackenzie, Alexander Slidell (1846). Life of Stephen Decatur: A Commodore in the Navy of the United States.
  C. C. Little and J. Brown. p. 443. Url
- Toll, Ian W. (2006). Six frigates: the epic history of the founding of the U.S. Navy.
  W. W. Norton & Company, New York. pp. 592. ISBN 978-0-393-05847-5. Url
- Tucker, Spencer; Reuter, Frank Theodore (1996). Injured honor: the Chesapeake-Leopard Affair, June 22, 1807. Naval Institute Press. p. 268. ISBN 978-1-55750-824-9. Url
- Watson, Paul Barron (1942). The tragic career of Commodore James Barron, U.S. Navy (1769-1851).
  Coward-McCann, Inc. p. 84.
