= Samuel Montague =

Samuel Montague may refer to:

- Samuel L. Montague (1829–1869), Massachusetts politician
- Samuel S. Montague (1830–1883), American railroad executive
- Samuel Montagu, 1st Baron Swaythling (1832–1911), British banker and philanthropist
- Samuel T. Montague (1868–1939), member of the Virginia Senate
