= USS Baltimore (1798) =

Sailing frigate

History
- Builder: Joseph Caverly
- Laid down: 1798
- Acquired: 23 May 1798
- Decommissioned: 1801
- Fate: Sold

General characteristics
- Type: Frigate
- Displacement: 422 tons
- Length: 103.8 ft (31.6 m)
- Beam: 30.7 ft (9.4 m)
- Complement: 180
- Armament: 18 × 9-pounders, 6 × 4-pounders

USS Baltimore was a ship of the United States Navy.

This 20-gun ship was built in 1798 by Joseph Caverly in Baltimore, Maryland, as Adriana. She was purchased with funds donated by the citizens of Baltimore to the Navy on 23 May 1798, renamed Baltimore, and placed under the command of Captain Isaac Phillips.

In August 1798 the Baltimore was ordered to join the Constellation and convoy a fleet of merchantmen home from Havana, Cuba. Late in 1798, Baltimore and Constitution were escorting a large convoy to Havana, when the latter sprung her bowsprit and returned home. Baltimore later, off Havana, Cuba, fell in with a British squadron consisting of HMS Carnatic(74), HMS Thunder(reportedly a 74 gun ship-of-the-line, but only Thunder in service at the time was an 8 gun vessel), HMS Queen(98), HMS Maidstone(32), HMS Greyhound (28) on 16 November 1798, who impressed 55 of her crew (50 were returned). Some of the escorted merchantmen were captured. On his return to the United States, Captain Phillips was dismissed for permitting an "outrage to the American flag". The incident also created much anti-British feeling among the Americans. Capt. Phillips was temporarily replaced as captain by Lt. Josias M. Speake with letter dated 10 January, 1799. Samuel Barron became her captain mid-March 1799.

During 1799 Baltimore took two prizes, and the following year three more, as well as recapturing three American vessels which had fallen into French hands. Sometime just before 11 June, 1799, she and USRC Eagle captured a prize, probably French ship "Siren". In a letter dated 17 July Secretary of the Navy Benjamin Stoddert stated that her gun deck was so low that in a good wind her guns were useless. On 20 December, 1799 under command of Master Commandant William Cowper (pronounced Cooper), she captured French brig L'Esperance 9-10 leagues west north west of Basse-Terre, Guadaloupe, prize was towed to St Christophers. On 12 January, 1800 she captured privateer "Le Bullant Jeunesse" (19°40′N 60°12′W). The next day she had an exchange with a French vessel, damaging it, but broke off the engagement fearing losing the prize ship. On 26 March, 1800 she captured French schooner "Brilliant Jeunesse". On 21 June she captured Polacre "Emmanuel". The next day she recaptured schooner "Jolly Robbins" and about the same time recaptured "Sea Flower". On 12 July, 1800 she captured armed schooner "La Quinolla". On 30 September she was ordered home by Guadalupe Station Commander Thomas Truxton due to poor condition and her crew's enlistment having expired. She arrived at Norfolk, and was then ordered to Baltimore on 21 October. On 19 November Navy Secretary Benjamin Stoddert issued Orders for her to be sold. At the close of the Quasi-War with France, she carried the ratified peace treaty to France. Upon her return, Baltimore was sold at Philadelphia in 1801.
