= Chesapeake–Leopard affair =

1807 naval incident between UK and US

- Part of the events leading to the War of 1812
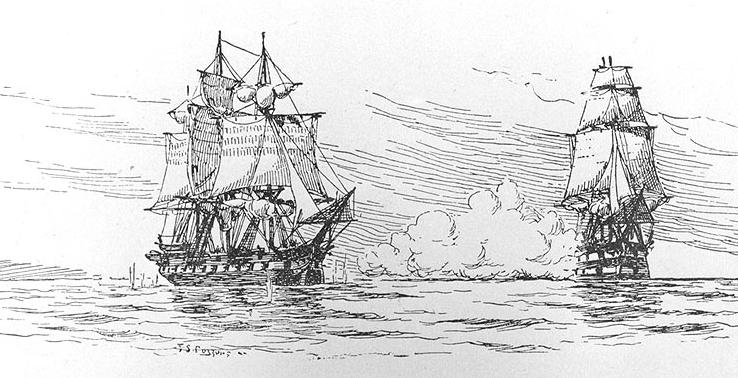
- HMS Leopard (right) fires upon USS Chesapeake
Date	June 22, 1807
Location	off Norfolk, Virginia
Result	British victory

Belligerents
United Kingdom	United States

Commanders and leaders
Salusbury Humphreys	James Barron

Strength
4th rate Leopard	Frigate Chesapeake

Casualties and losses
None	Chesapeake damaged; 4 killed; 17 wounded

The Chesapeake–Leopard affair was a naval engagement off the coast of Norfolk, Virginia, on June 22, 1807, between the British fourth-rate HMS Leopard and the American frigate USS Chesapeake. The crew of Leopard pursued, attacked, and boarded the American frigate, looking for deserters from the Royal Navy. Chesapeake was caught unprepared and after a short battle involving broadsides received from Leopard, the commander of Chesapeake, James Barron, surrendered his vessel to the British. Chesapeake had fired only one shot.

Four crew members were removed from the American vessel and were tried for desertion, one of whom was subsequently hanged. Chesapeake was allowed to return home, where James Barron was court martialed and relieved of command.

The Chesapeake–Leopard affair created an uproar among Americans. There were strident calls for war with the United Kingdom, but these quickly subsided. President Thomas Jefferson initially attempted to use this widespread bellicosity to diplomatically threaten the British government into settling the matter. The United States Congress backed away from armed conflict when British envoys showed no contrition for the Chesapeake affair, delivering proclamations reaffirming impressment. Jefferson's political failure to coerce the UK led him toward economic warfare: the Embargo of 1807.

== Background ==
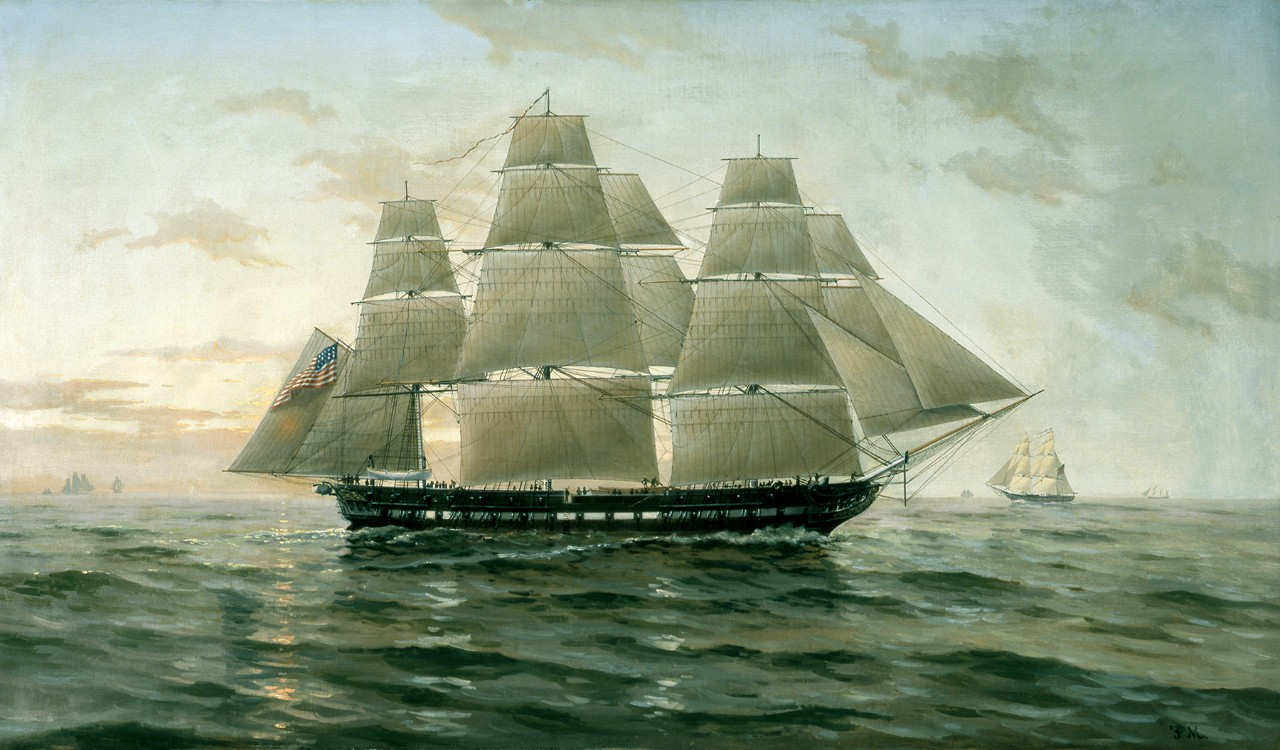
USS Chesapeake, depicted in a c. 1900 painting by F. Muller

On June 22, 1807, during the Napoleonic Wars, several British naval vessels were on duty on the North American Station, blockading two French third-rate warships in Chesapeake Bay. A number of Royal Navy seamen had deserted from their ships and local American authorities gave them sanctuary. One of the deserters, a Londoner named Jenkin Ratford, joined the crew of USS Chesapeake. Ratford had made himself conspicuous to British officers by shouting at them on the streets of Norfolk, Virginia.

Other deserters were reported to be at the Gosport Navy Yard, then commanded by Stephen Decatur. Decatur received a letter from the British consul ordering him to turn over three men alleged to have deserted from HMS Melampus. The consul claimed the men had enlisted in the U.S. Navy, which was recruiting a crew for Chesapeake, then at the Washington Navy Yard outfitting for a voyage to the Mediterranean.

Vice-Admiral Sir George Berkeley dispatched his flagship, the fourth-rate warship HMS Leopard, with written orders authorizing him to board and search the United States warship to recover any deserters. Berkeley ordered Leopard's captain to search for deserters from HMS Belleisle, HMS Bellona, HMS Triumph, HMS Chichester, HMS Halifax, and the cutter HMS Zenobia.

== Attack and search ==
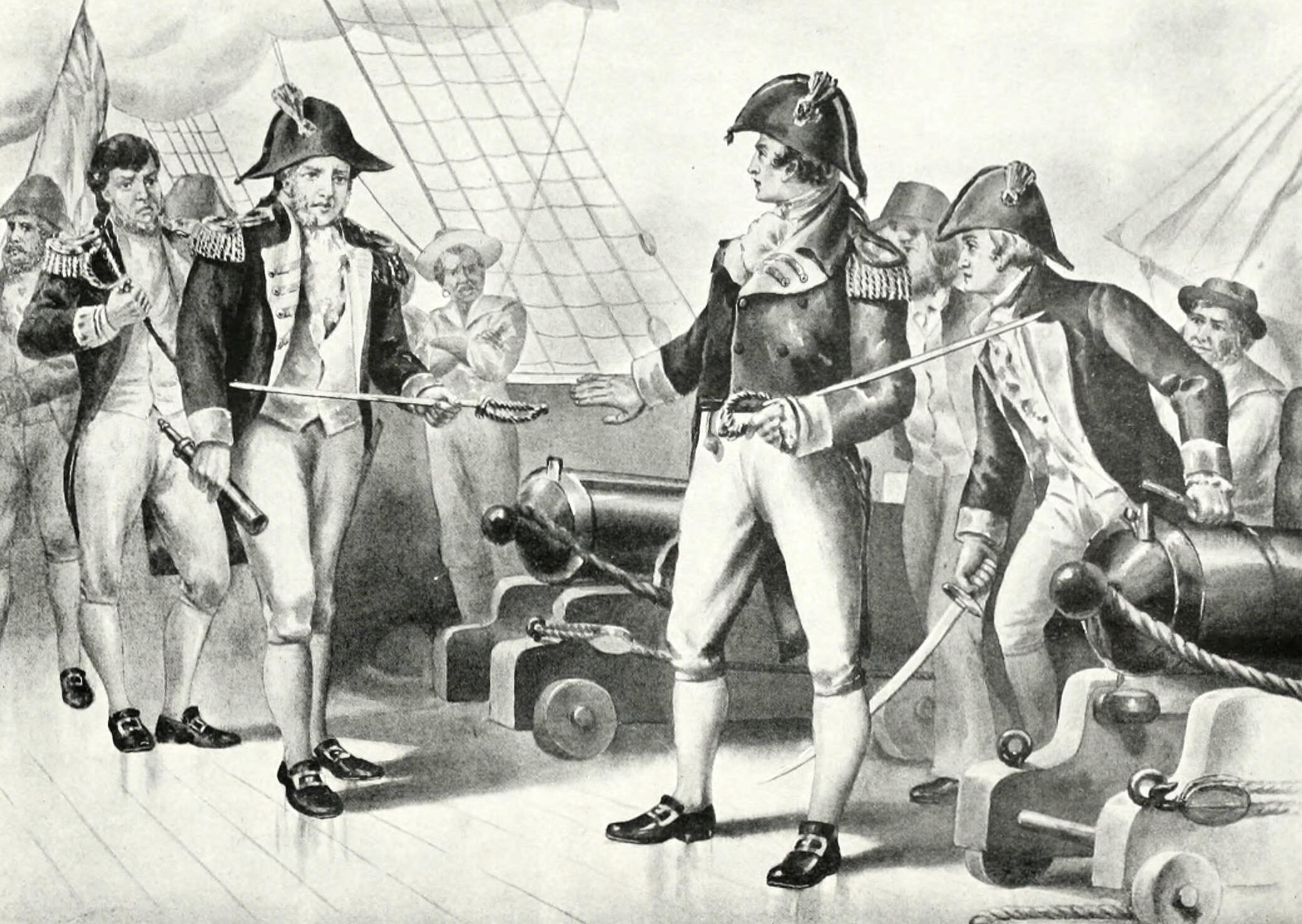
Barron offering his sword to Humphreys onboard Chesapeake

Chesapeake was off the coast of Norfolk, Virginia, commanded by Commodore James Barron, when Leopard, under Captain Salusbury Pryce Humphreys, encountered and hailed her. Barron was not alarmed, and received Lieutenant John Meade on board, who presented Barron with the search warrant. After an inconclusive discussion, Meade returned to Leopard. Captain Humphreys, using a hailing trumpet, ordered the American ship to submit. When Chesapeake did not, Humphreys fired a round across her bow. This was followed immediately by Leopard firing broadsides into the American ship. Her guns unloaded and her decks cluttered with stores in preparation for a long cruise, Chesapeake managed to fire only a single gun in reply. The humiliated Barron struck his colors and surrendered. Three of Chesapeake's crew had been killed and 18 wounded, including Barron, by the attack. However, Humphreys refused the surrender and sent a boarding party to Chesapeake to search for deserters.

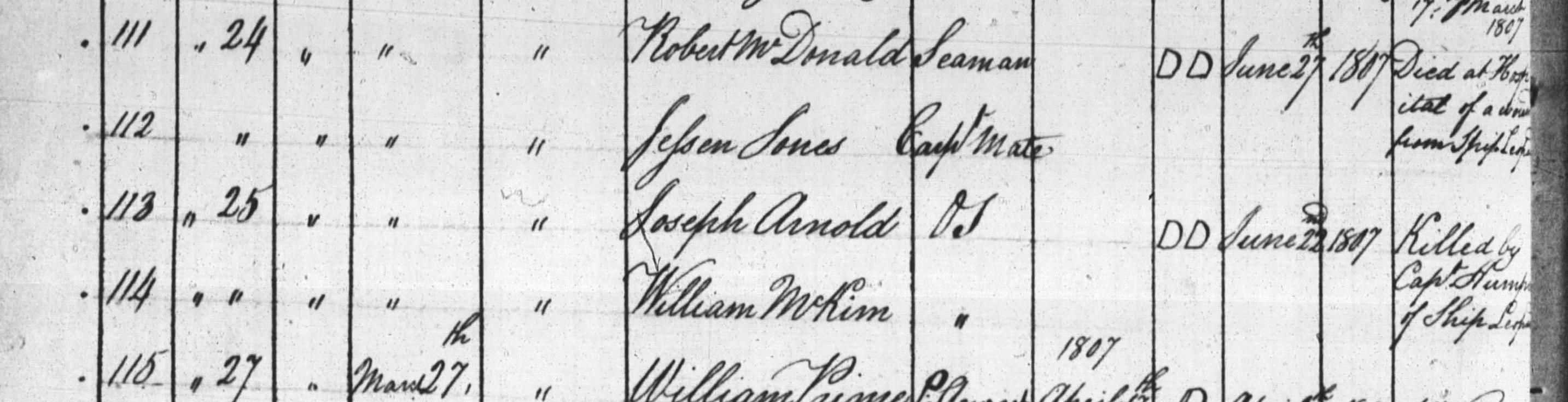
1807 USS Chesapeake, muster listing crewmen Robert McDonald & Joseph Arnold as killed by Capt S. Humphreys

Scores of British nationals had signed on as crewmen of Chesapeake, but Humphreys seized only the four Royal Navy deserters: Daniel Martin, John Strachan and William Ware all from HMS Melampus, and Jenkin Ratford, formerly on HMS Halifax. Only Ratford was British-born. The others were American residents, but had been serving on British warships. Daniel Martin, for instance, claimed he was born in Westport, Massachusetts; he was described as age 24, 5 feet 5 1/2 inches (166 cm) high with "woolly hair", black eyes and dark yellow complexion and a small scar over his right eyebrow. Prior to serving on Chesapeake, Martin served on the merchant vessel Caledonia and was described as "a colored man." Newspaper accounts of the time state Martin was not born in the United States but brought to Massachusetts, (possibly enslaved) when he was six years old by mariner William Howland, from Buenos Aires.

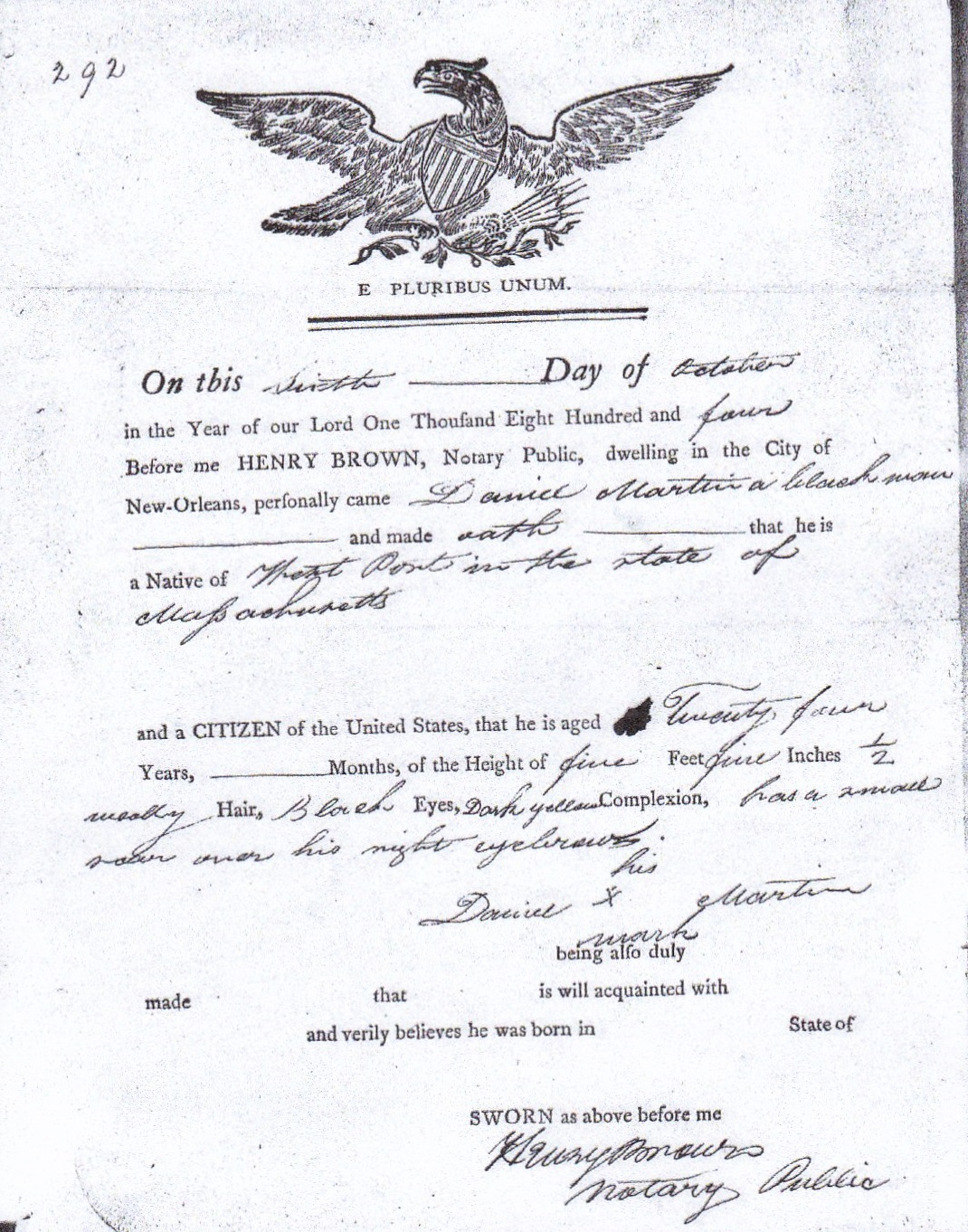
Seaman's protection certificate issued in New Orleans, to Daniel Martin on 6 Oct. 1804

The brig Columbine brought the first dispatches to Halifax in early July. Leopard followed with her prisoners for trial. Jenkin Ratford, the sole British citizen, was sentenced to death and was hanged from the yardarm of Halifax on August 31, 1807. The three American deserters received sentences of 500 lashes each, but the sentences were later commuted.

The bloody encounter caused a storm of protest from the U.S. government, and the British government eventually offered to return the three American residents and to pay reparations for the damage to Chesapeake. After over 5 years spent in bonded service with the Royal Navy, the last two deserters were returned to Boston, Massachusetts by the schooner HMS Bream, one month after the outbreak of the War of 1812.

== Aftermath ==
The incident outraged American public opinion, and many felt the country's "sense of honor" had been violated. Americans of every political stripe spoke of the need to uphold national honor, and to reject the dismissal of the United States by the British as a third-class nonentity. Americans talked incessantly about the need for force in response. President Thomas Jefferson noted: "Never since the Battle of Lexington have I seen this country in such a state of exasperation as at present, and even that did not produce such unanimity." James Monroe, then a foreign minister acting under instructions from U.S. Secretary of State James Madison, demanded British disavowal of the deed, the restoration of the four seamen, the recall of Admiral Berkeley, the exclusion of British warships from U.S. territorial waters, and the abolition of impressments from vessels under the United States flag.

The event raised tensions between the two countries and, while possibly not a direct cause, was one of the events leading up to the War of 1812. Many Americans demanded war because of the attack, but President Jefferson turned to diplomacy and economic pressure in the form of the ill-fated Embargo Act of 1807.

The Federal government began to be concerned about the lack of war material. Their concerns led to the establishment of a tariff protecting the manufacturers of gunpowder, which helped ensure the fortunes of the DuPont company.

The incident had significant repercussions for the U.S. Navy. The public was shocked that Chesapeake had not been able to put up any resistance and surrendered so quickly, questioning the ability of the Navy to defend the country in the case of a war with the United Kingdom, despite the expensive and controversial frigate-building program. A court-martial blamed Barron and suspended him from service for five years as punishment.

In 1820, Commodore Barron challenged and mortally wounded Commodore Stephen Decatur in a duel over remarks Decatur had made about Barron's conduct in 1807 (Barron had also been wounded). Decatur had served on the court-martial that found Barron guilty of being unprepared and barred him from command for five years.

Chesapeake herself was captured during the War of 1812, when on June 1, 1813, after a series of naval engagements with the Royal Navy, the British frigate HMS Shannon captured Chesapeake in a single-ship action near Boston. The Royal Navy commissioned Chesapeake, but put her up for sale at Portsmouth in July 1819. Her timbers are now part of the Chesapeake Mill in Wickham, England.

== In fiction ==
The fallout from the Chesapeake–Leopard affair features prominently in two novels of the Aubrey–Maturin series by Patrick O'Brian. It is first mentioned in the fourth novel “Mauritius command” fifth novel, Desolation Island, when the fictional Captain Jack Aubrey is given command of Leopard (which he privately refers to as the "horrible old Leopard") a few years after the incident. Though the United States and the United Kingdom are at peace at the time, and neither he nor any member of his crew had any direct involvement with the affair, he is met with mistrust and hostility from American whalers due to their negative association with the ship. The subsequent capture of Chesapeake during the War of 1812 features prominently in the sixth Aubrey–Maturin novel, The Fortune of War, as Aubrey is aboard HMS Shannon during the engagement.

The Chesapeake–Leopard affair is mentioned in the Boston Jacky novel of the Bloody Jack adventures series by L.A. Meyer.

== See also ==
- Little Belt affair
- Bibliography of early United States naval history
- Attacks on the United States

== Bibliography ==
- Cooper, James Fenimore (1826). History of the navy of the United States of America. Stringer & Townsend, New York. p. 508. OCLC 197401914.
- Dickon, Chris (2008). The enduring journey of the USS Chesapeake: ... The Hickory Press, Charleston, SC. p. 157. ISBN 978-1-59629-298-7.
- Guttridge, Leonard F (2005). Stephen Decatur American Naval Hero, 1779–1820. New York: Tom Doherty Associates, LLC. p. 304. ISBN 978-0-7653-0702-6.
- Ivie, Robert L. "The metaphor of force in prowar discourse: The case of 1812." Quarterly Journal of Speech 68#3 (1982) pp. 240–253.
- James, William (1824). The Naval History of Great Britain, from the Declaration of War by France in 1793, to the Accession of George IV. Vol. 4. London: Baldwin, Chadock and Joy.
- Mackenzie, Alexander Slidell (2005) [1846]. Life of Stephen Decatur: a commodore in the Navy of the United States. C. C. Little and J. Brown.
- McMaster, John Bach (1901). A History of the People of the United States: From the Revolution to the Civil War. Vol. III: 1803–1812. New York: D. Appleton and Company – via Internet Archive.
- Perkins, Bradford (1974) [1968], Levy, Leonard (ed.), "Embargo: Alternative to War (Chapter 8 from Prologue to War: England and the United States, 1805–1812, University of California Press)", Essays on the Early Republic 1789–1815, Dryden Press
- Risjord, Norman K. "1812: Conservatives, War Hawks and the Nation's Honor." William and Mary Quarterly: A Magazine of Early American History (1961): 196–210. in JSTOR
- Toll, Ian W (2006). Six Frigates: The Epic History of the Founding of the US Navy. New York: W. W. Norton. ISBN 978-0-393-05847-5. OCLC 70291925.
- Tucker, Spencer; Reuter, Frank Theodore (1996). Injured honor: the Chesapeake-Leopard Affair, June 22, 1807. Naval Institute Press. ISBN 1-55750-824-0. OCLC 70291925.
