= Joseph T. Deal =

American politician

Joseph Thomas Deal
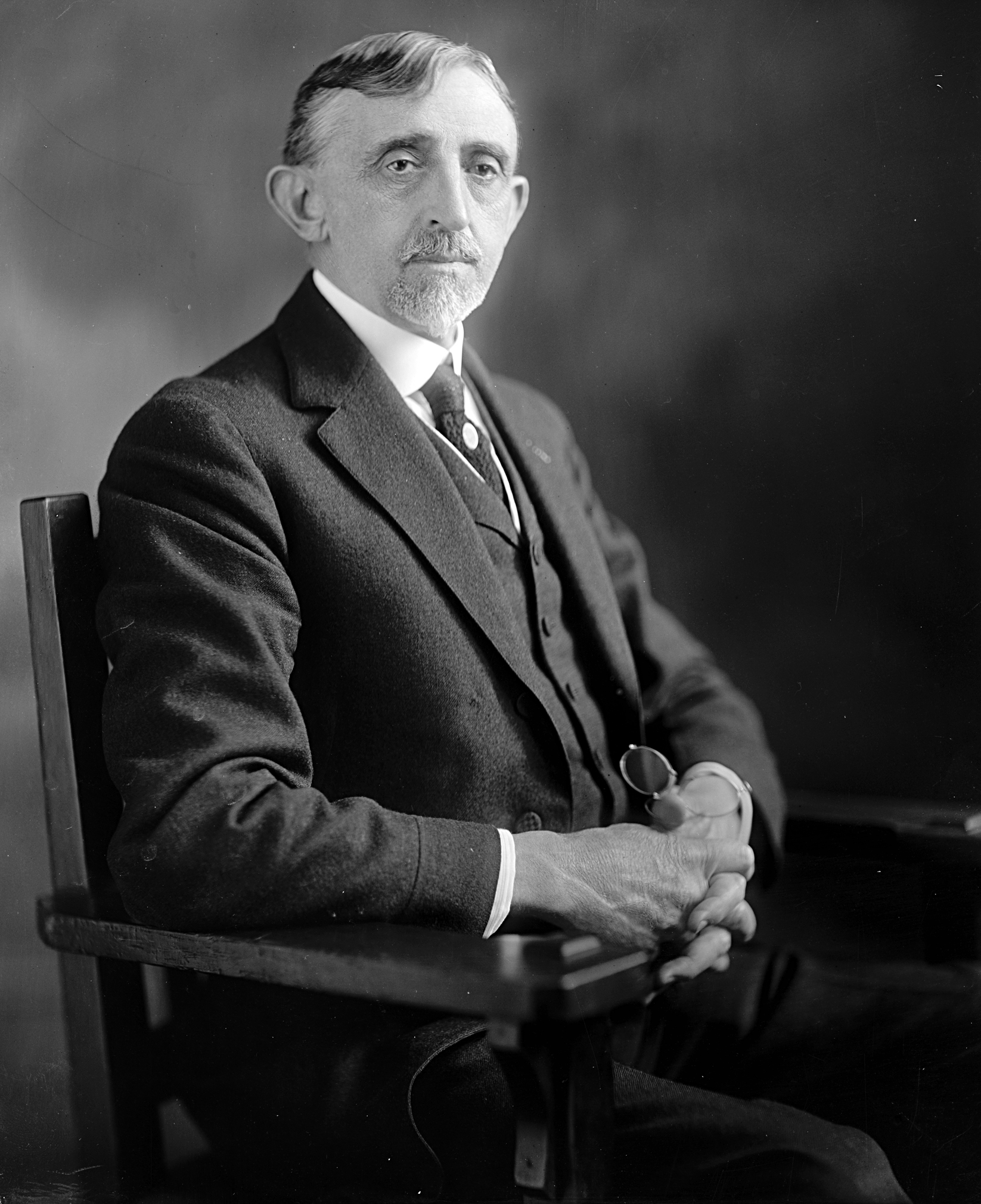

Member of the U.S. House of Representatives from Virginia's 2nd district
- In office March 4, 1921 – March 3, 1929
- Preceded by: Edward E. Holland
- Succeeded by: Menalcus Lankford

Member of the Virginia Senate from the 31st district
- In office January 14, 1920 – March 4, 1921
- Preceded by: Earl C. Mathews
- Succeeded by: E. Griffith Dodson

Member of the Virginia House of Delegates from Norfolk City
- In office January 12, 1910 – January 10, 1912
- Preceded by: William W. Old, Jr.
- Succeeded by: Daniel Coleman

Personal details
- Born: November 19, 1860 Surry, Virginia, U.S.
- Died: March 7, 1942 (aged 81) Norfolk, Virginia, U.S.
- Party: Democratic
- Education: Virginia Military Institute
- Profession: civil engineer, businessman

Joseph Thomas Deal (November 19, 1860 – March 7, 1942) was an American businessman and politician who served four terms as a U.S. representative from Virginia from 1921 to 1929.

== Biography ==
Born near Surry, Virginia, Deal attended the public schools. He was graduated from Virginia Military Institute at Lexington in 1882. He engaged in civil engineering and lumber manufacturing in Surry County, Virginia in 1883. He moved to Norfolk, Virginia, in 1891. He served as chairman of the Improvement Board of Norfolk in 1905–1910. He served as delegate to the Democratic National Convention in 1908. He served as member of the Virginia House of Delegates during the period 1910–1912. He served in the Senate of Virginia in 1919.

=== Congress ===
Deal was elected as a Democrat to the Sixty-seventh and to the three succeeding Congresses (March 4, 1921 – March 3, 1929).

He was an unsuccessful candidate for reelection in 1928 to the Seventy-first Congress, and also an unsuccessful candidate for the Democratic nomination for Governor in 1933, gaining only 21.25 percent of the primary vote against Byrd Democrat George Campbell Peery.

=== Later career and death ===
He resumed his activities in the lumber business until his death in Norfolk, Virginia, on March 7, 1942. He was interred in Forest Lawn Cemetery.

== Elections ==
- 1920; Deal was elected to the U.S. House of Representatives defeating Republican Menalcus Lankford and Independent Colin F. Munro, winning 73.59% of the vote.
- 1922; Deal was re-elected defeating Republicans P.S. Stephenson and W.W. Foreman, winning 86.54% of the vote.
- 1924; Deal was re-elected defeating Republican Lankford, winning 65.75% of the vote.
- 1926; Deal was re-elected defeating Republican L.S. Parsons, winning 65.41% of the vote.
- 1928; Deal was defeated for re-election by Republican Lankford.

== Sources ==
- United States Congress. "Joseph T. Deal (id: D000169)". Biographical Directory of the United States Congress.

U.S. House of Representatives
Preceded by Edward E. Holland	Member of the U.S. House of Representatives from Virginia's 2nd congressional district 1929–1933	Succeeded by Menalcus Lankford
