= E. Griffith Dodson =

American politician (1884–1969)

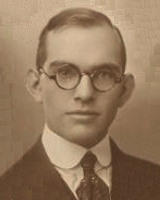

17th Clerk of the Virginia House of Delegates
- In office November 24, 1934 – January 10, 1962
- Preceded by: John W. Williams
- Succeeded by: George R. Rich

Member of the Virginia Senate from the 31st district
- In office January 11, 1922 – February 28, 1923
- Preceded by: Joseph T. Deal
- Succeeded by: John A. Lesner

Member of the Virginia House of Delegates from Norfolk City
- In office January 9, 1918 – January 11, 1922
- Preceded by: W. P. Cousins
- Succeeded by: Israel Brown

Personal details
- Born: Edward Griffith Dodson; April 30, 1884 Norfolk, Virginia, U.S.
- Died: April 8, 1969 (aged 84) Norfolk, Virginia, U.S.
- Party: Democratic
- Spouse: Harriotte Jones Winchester
- Education: University of Virginia (LL.B.)

Edward Griffith Dodson (April 30, 1884 – April 8, 1969) was an American lawyer and Democratic politician who was Clerk of the Virginia House of Delegates from 1934 to 1962, and author of much-used biographical compilations of Virginia public officials.

== Early and family life ==
Born in Norfolk, Virginia on April 30, 1884, to Robert Adolphus Dodson (1861–1913) and Julia Edwards Griffith Dodson (1861–1916), Dodson was educated in the local public schools and received a law degree from the University of Virginia in 1907. His brother Gustavus Pfeltz Dodson (1893–1915) died not long after Dodson married Harriotte Jones Winchester of Macon, Georgia on January 29, 1913. Their son Edward Griffith Dodson Jr. later followed in his father's footsteps at the University of Virginia, as a lawyer and as a delegate from Roanoke, Virginia in the Virginia General Assembly from 1938 to 1954 (while his father served as its clerk).

== Career ==
A lifelong Democrat and member of what became the Byrd Organization, Dodson's elective career began on the Norfolk Board of Alderman (1912 to 1918). He was a member of the Democratic State Central Committee from 1916 to 1938, and served as campaign manager in Norfolk for Harry F. Byrd in his successful run for Governor against G. Walter Mapp in 1925. Dodson was a member of the State Commission on Conservation and Development from 1926 to 1934, and helped start Virginia's program of historical markers, advocating preserving and using the Commonwealth's historic resources to foster tourism. He participated in developing historic Jamestown, Virginia and the British goodwill tour on the 350th anniversary of the colony's founding in 1955. He was also director of Norfolk's Seaboard Citizens National Bank.

Dodson was twice elected to the Virginia House of Delegates (1918 to 1920) to represent Norfolk. He also served briefly in the Virginia State Senate (1922–1923), succeeding Joseph T. Deal, who was elected to the U.S. House, until John A. Lesner resumed his state senate seat.

Serving as Clerk of the Virginia House of Delegates (1934 to 1962) facilitated Dodson's compilations of Virginia history: The Capitol of the Commonwealth of Virginia at Richmond (1937), The General Assembly of the Commonwealth of Virginia, 1885–1918 (1960),The General Assembly of the Commonwealth of Virginia, 1919–1939 (1939), Speakers and Clerks of the Virginia House of Delegates, 1776–1955 (1956) and The General Assembly of the Commonwealth of Virginia 1940–1960 (1961).

== Death and legacy ==
Dodson died in Norfolk, Virginia, on April 8, 1969, and was buried at the city's Elmwood cemetery.

His papers (and those of his son E. Griffith Dodson Jr., who died in 2001) are held by the Library of Virginia. His son served in the U.S. Navy commanding a submarine chaser in the Pacific Ocean during World War II, became the first president of the Roanoke Jaycees, and served as President of the Virginia State Bar 1961-62 (and as chair of its Senior Lawyers Section in 1996–97) after representing Roanoke in the Virginia House of Delegates before the Massive Resistance crisis began.

Virginia House of Delegates
Preceded by W. P. Cousins	Virginia Delegate for Norfolk City; 1918–1922; Served alongside: John W. Cherry	Succeeded by Israel Brown
Preceded by John W. Williams	Clerk of the House of Delegates; 1934–1962	Succeeded by George R. Rich
Senate of Virginia
Preceded by Joseph T. Deal	Virginia Senator for the 31st District; 1922–1923	Succeeded by John A. Lesner
