= HMS Prospero (1803) =

History

Great Britain
- Name: Albion
- Namesake: Albion— an archaic name for Great Britain
- Builder: Nicholson, Horn & Blenkinsop, South Shields
- Launched: 1800
- Fate: Sold 1803

United Kingdom
- Name: HMS Prospero
- Namesake: Prospero
- Acquired: 1803 by purchase
- Fate: Wrecked 1807

General characteristics
- Tons burthen: 400 (bm)
- Length: 107 ft 0 in (32.6 m) (overall); 81 ft 3 in (24.8 m) (keel)
- Beam: 30 ft 5 in (9.3 m)
- Depth of hold: 13 ft 6 in (4.1 m)
- Propulsion: Sail
- Complement: 67 (HMS)
- Armament: 1 × 13in + 1 × 10in mortar + 8 × 24-pounder carronades

HMS Prospero was the mercantile Albion, launched at South Shields in 1800. The British Royal Navy purchased her in 1803 and converted her to a bomb vessel. She foundered in 1807 with the loss of almost her entire crew.

== Albion ==
It has not proved possible to identify Albion in either Lloyd's Register or the Register of Shipping. Both show an Albion, of 412 tons (bm), launched at Shields in 1800. However, both also show this Albion as still trading with the West Indies as late as 1809.

Year	Master	Owner	Trade	Source
1809	W. Meek	Taylor & Co.	London—Antigua	Lloyd's Register
1809	W. Meek	Tayler & Co.	London—Jamaica	Register of Shipping

This information could be stale. The registers were only as current and accurate as owners chose to keep them.

== HMS Prospero ==
The Navy renamed Albion HMS Prospero as it had just launched a 74-gun HMS Albion. Prospero underwent fitting out at Deptford Dockyard between 5 November 1803 and 24 February 1804. Prospero, Hecla, and Meteor came into Portsmouth on 28 December 1803 to be fitted as bomb vessels, which work was to be done expeditiously.

Commander Salusbury Pryce Humphreys commissioned her in January 1804. In June Commander Charles Jones replaced Humphreys. On 9 April 1806 Prospero sent a vessel under American colours into the Downs.

Commander Gustavus Stupart then commanded Prospero in the Downs between 19 June 1805 and 25 August 1806. On 5 June 1806 she recaptured Autumn, Philip Pank, master.

Commander William King assumed command in September 1806.

== Fate ==
Prospero was caught in a storm and wrecked near Dieppe on 18 February 1807. Only six members of her crew survived.
