= Menalcus Lankford =

American politician (1883–1937)

Mack Lankford

Member of the U.S. House of Representatives from Virginia's 2nd district
- In office March 4, 1929 – March 3, 1933
- Preceded by: Joseph T. Deal
- Succeeded by: District abolished Colgate Darden after district re-established in 1935

Personal details
- Born: Menalcus Lankford; March 14, 1883 Bowers Plantation, Franklin, Southampton County, Virginia
- Died: December 27, 1937 (aged 54) Norfolk, Virginia
- Resting place: Forest Lawn cemetery, Norfolk
- Party: Republican
- Spouse: Nancy Waddill
- Education: University of Richmond; University of Virginia School of Law
- Profession: lawyer

Military service
- Branch/service: United States Navy aviation
- Rank: Ensign
- Battles/wars: World War I

Menalcus ("Mack") Lankford (March 14, 1883 – December 27, 1937) was a Virginia lawyer, naval aviator and Republican politician who served two terms as U.S. Representative from Virginia's 2nd congressional district, whose largest city is Norfolk.

== Early and family life ==
Born in 1883 on the Bowers plantation near Franklin in Southampton County to Mary Conway Burnley (1851-1895) and her husband, Dr. Livius Lankford (1854-1917), Lankford had an elder brother, Dr. Burnley Lankford (1880-1926) who also survived to adulthood. The family moved to Norfolk when he was a child, and he attended schools there and graduated from the (segregated) Norfolk High School. Lankford traveled to the state capital for higher studies, graduating from the University of Richmond in 1904, and from the law department of the University of Virginia at Charlottesville in 1906.

In 1909 Lankford married Nancy Waddill, one of the daughter of Congressman and judge Edmund Waddill Jr., and granddaughter of Edmund Waddill, who served as clerk of the Charles City County circuit court for decades.

== Career ==
After admission to the Virginia bar the same year, Lankford began his legal practice in Norfolk, Virginia. During the First World War, he served as an ensign in the aviation service of the United States Navy.

Returning to Norfolk, Lankford attempted to revitalize the Republican party in Tidewater Virginia. He ran for Congress in both 1920 to the Sixty-seventh Congress and in 1924 to the Sixty-ninth Congress, but lost.

Lankford won election as a Republican in 1928 (the first Republican elected in the district in three decades), and re-election, so he served in both the Seventy-first and Seventy-second Congresses (March 4, 1929 – March 3, 1933). He secured a new post office and courthouse for Norfolk. Because U.S. District Judge D. Lawrence Groner ruled for the black plaintiffs in two voting rights cases, some thought that after President Herbert Hoover (a fellow Republican) promoted Judge Groner to the U.S. Court of Appeals for the District of Columbia Circuit, Lankford would receive the nomination as District Court judge for the Eastern District of Virginia, where his father-in-law had served. However, the 1930 elections only gave the Republicans a slim majority in the House, so Lankford's vote became crucial. Lankford worked for the nomination of his former campaign manager and Assistant U.S. Attorney, Luther B. Way, to the district court vacancy. However, as the Great Depression deepened, Virginia (following the lead of the Byrd Organization) in 1932 held an at-large election for all Congressional districts, leading to a Democratic sweep, despite Lankford's having secured almost $2 million in construction contracts for federal buildings in Norfolk. When individual districts were again established in 1934, Colgate Darden of Southampton County (who had been elected at-large to the Seventy-third Congress) was elected to the re-established 2nd congressional district. Lankford was a delegate to the Republican National Conventions in both 1932 and 1936.

Following Lankford's at-large election loss, President Hoover appointed Lankford Referee in Bankruptcy of the Norfolk division, United States District Court, Eastern District of Virginia. He served until his death, reporting to District Judge Way, whom he had sponsored.

== Death and legacy ==
Lankford died at his Norfolk home of a heart attack, aged 54, on December 27, 1937. Following a very-well-attended funeral in his Baptist church, he was interred in Norfolk's historic Forest Lawn Cemetery.

== Electoral history ==
- 1928; Lankford was elected to the U.S. House of Representatives defeating Democrat Joseph T. Deal and Independent E.L. Breden, winning 55.89% of the vote.
- 1930; Lankford was re-elected defeating Democrat Deal, winning 54.41% of the vote.
- 1932; Lankford was defeated for re-election by the at-large Democratic ticket.

U.S. House of Representatives
Preceded by Joseph T. Deal	Member of the U.S. House of Representatives from Virginia's 2nd congressional district 1929–1933	Succeeded by District abolished Colgate Darden after district re-established in 1935
