= John A. Lesner =

American politician

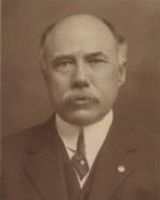
- Official portrait, 1912

Member of the Virginia Senate
- In office February 28, 1923 – July 5, 1938
- Preceded by: E. Griffith Dodson
- Succeeded by: Ralph H. Daughton
- Constituency: 31st district (1923‍–‍1924); 2nd district (1924‍–‍1938)
- In office January 10, 1912 – January 12, 1916
- Preceded by: William Wilson Sale
- Succeeded by: Earl C. Mathews
- Constituency: 31st district
- In office January 8, 1908 – January 10, 1912
- Preceded by: John C. Niemeyer
- Succeeded by: Samuel T. Montague
- Constituency: 33rd district

Personal details
- Born: John Adam Lesner; June 26, 1868 Norfolk, Virginia, U.S.
- Died: July 5, 1938 (aged 70) Norfolk, Virginia, U.S.
- Party: Democratic
- Spouse: Rose Isaac Creekmur

John Adam Lesner (June 26, 1868 – July 5, 1938) was an American Democratic politician who served twice as a member of the Senate of Virginia, from 1908 to 1916 and from 1923 until his death in 1938. The district had two senators from 1924 until 1932, and lawyer James Smith Barron was the other senator until census-based reapportionment also changed the district number.

The Lesner Bridge in Virginia Beach, Virginia is named after him.

Senate of Virginia
Preceded by John C. Niemeyer	Virginia Senator for the 33rd District; 1908–1912	Succeeded by Samuel T. Montague
Preceded by William W. Sale	Virginia Senator for the 31st District; 1912–1916; 1923–1924	Succeeded by Earl C. Mathews
Preceded by E. Griffith Dodson	Virginia Senator for the 31st District; 1912–1916; 1923–1924	Succeeded by Thomas J. Downing
Preceded by J. Frank Sergent	Virginia Senator for the 2nd District; 1924–1938; Served alongside: James S. Barron, John W. Eggleston, Vivian L. Page	Succeeded by Ralph H. Daughton
