= Lesner Bridge =

- Coordinates: 36°54′27″N 76°05′30″W
- Carries: US 60
- Crosses: Lynnhaven River
- Locale: Virginia Beach, Virginia
- Official name: John A. Lesner Bridge
- Owner: City of Virginia Beach

The Lesner Bridge in Virginia Beach, Virginia connects the bay area to the Virginia Beach shore via Shore Drive (U.S. Route 60) — crossing the Lynnhaven Inlet at the mouth the Chesapeake Bay. The bridge lies approximately three miles from the southern terminus of the Chesapeake Bay Bridge-Tunnel. The first bridge in the same location, a draw-bridge, had been constructed in 1928, replaced in 1958 by what are now the eastbound lanes of a dual span. Westbound lanes were constructed as a parallel span in 1967.

The Lesner Bridge was named after John A. Lesner, a Democratic Virginia State Senator who had earlier represented Norfolk County and the City of Norfolk, beginning in 1908.

In February 2016, a move was afoot, supported by the local newspaper, to rename the bridge in honor of US Navy Admiral Jeremiah Denton or change it to its commonly known name of Lynnhaven Inlet Bridge. Local residents and the Lesner family oppose the change and a public poll resulted in no support for the name change.

Stephen Mansfield wrote in the book "Princess Anne County and Virginia Beach, A Pictorial History," (page 151) that the General Assembly voted to name the bridge after State Senator John A. Lesner in recognition for his service on the State Highway Commission.

== Bridge replacement ==
In 2014 the City of Virginia Beach began a project to replace the Lesner Bridge with expanded spans that each have two travel lanes and a 10 feet (3.0 m) wide multi-use path. The new bridge will be capable of six total lanes in the future. Construction on the new westbound span started in June 2014, and was opened to traffic in November 2016.

In December 2016, eastbound traffic shifted to the new westbound bridge while the existing spans were demolished and construction began on the new eastbound bridge.

On December 12, 2018, the new Lesner Bridge was officially opened to the public.
