= John W. Williams (legislative clerk) =

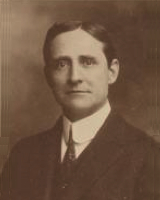

16th Clerk of the Virginia House of Delegates
- In office December 4, 1901 – November 15, 1934
- Preceded by: Thomas H. Bigger
- Succeeded by: E. Griffith Dodson

Personal details
- Born: John William Williams; March 23, 1869 Pearisburg, Virginia, US
- Died: November 15, 1934 (aged 65) Richmond, Virginia, US
- Party: Democratic
- Spouse: Annie Johnston Snidow
- Education: Roanoke College; University of Virginia

John William Williams (March 23, 1869 – November 15, 1934) was an American lawyer who served as Clerk of the Virginia House of Delegates from 1901 to his death in 1934. He served as that body's journal clerk from 1895 to 1901.

Virginia House of Delegates
Preceded by Thomas H. Bigger	Clerk of the Virginia House of Delegates; 1901–1934	Succeeded by E. Griffith Dodson
