= HMS Bermuda (1805) =

Bermuda-built UK naval sloop 1805–1808

- Bermuda

History

United Kingdom
- Name: HMS Bermuda
- Ordered: 1803
- Launched: 1805
- Commissioned: October 1805
- Fate: Wrecked on 22 April 1808

General characteristics
- Class & type: Bermuda-class sloop
- Tons burthen: 399 (bm)
- Length: 107 ft (32.6 m)
- Beam: 29 ft 11 in (9.12 m)
- Draught: 14 ft 8 in (4.47 m)
- Propulsion: Sails
- Complement: 121
- Armament: 16 × 24-pounder carronades + 2 × 9-pounder bow chasers

HMS Bermuda was an 18-gun sloop of the Royal Navy.

Bermuda was built in Bermuda of Bermuda cedar in 1805, as the lead ship of her class. The Bermudas were modified versions of the Dasher-class sloop of 1797, and eventually consisted of six ships. She was launched in 1805, and commissioned in October that year under the command of William Henry Byam, who transferred from Busy, which was then on the North America Station. Bermuda only spent three years in service before being wrecked on Memory Rock in the area known as Little Bahamas Bank, Bahamas on 22 April 1808.

Bermuda was searching for a rich Portuguese ship when she hit a reef during the night. Next morning Byam sighted a ship aground about five miles away. She proved to be Concepcion, the vessel they were looking for Bermuda could not be freed from the reef, but Conception could be. Byam and his crew captured the Portuguese ship, which they sailed on 26 April to New Providence, arriving on 4 May. Before they sailed they left a lieutenant, a midshipman, and six seamen to guard the stores. (Five men also took the opportunity to desert in Bermuda's jolly boat.) Rescuers returned to the wreck, salvaging what they could, before abandoning the wreck on 3 June. The court martial attributed the loss to an excessively strong current.

Captain Byam went on to command HMS Opossum.
