= HMS Crash (1797) =

Brig of the Royal Navy

History

Great Britain
- Name: HMS Crash
- Ordered: 7 February 1797
- Builder: Mrs Frances Barnard & Co, Deptford
- Laid down: February 1797
- Launched: 5 April 1797
- Commissioned: April 1797
- Captured: 26 August 1798

Batavian Republic
- Name: de Crash
- Acquired: by capture 26 August 1798
- Captured: 11 August 1799

Great Britain
- Name: HMS Crash
- Acquired: By capture 11 August 1799
- Fate: Sold September 1802

General characteristics
- Class & type: Acute-class gun-brig
- Tons burthen: 16047/94 (bm)
- Length: Overall:75 ft 3 in (22.94 m); Keel:61 ft 10 1/2 in (18.860 m)
- Beam: 22 ft 1 in (6.73 m)
- Depth of hold: 7 ft 11 1/2 in (2.426 m)
- Sail plan: Brig
- Complement: 50
- Armament: 12 × 18-pounder carronades + 2 × 24-pounder bow chasers

HMS Crash was a 12-gun Acute-class gun-brig. She was launched in April 1797 as GB No. 15 and received the name Crash in August. She served against the French and Dutch in the Napoleonic Wars, though after her capture in 1798 she spent a year in the service of the Batavian Republic before the British recaptured her. She was sold in 1802.

== Design ==
John Henslow designed the Acute-class gun-brigs. They were initially given numbers only, but on 7 August they all received names.

== Initial service ==
GB No. 15 was commissioned in April 1797 under Lieutenant James Anderson. (Note: The letters "GB" were never stated to be an abbreviation for "gunboat". Certainly by 1797 the term "gun-brig" was used, and the letters "GB" more likely represented that title, but still the letters were not explicitly an abbreviation.)

Under Lieutenant Bulkeley Mackworth Praed, who took command in early 1797, Crash participated in operations under Sir Home Popham against the locks and sluice gates of the Bruges canal in May 1798.

== Loss to capture ==
On 23 August she was in company with Ariadne but they separated in bad weather that worsened as it continued. Crash did not handle the weather well despite the crew having thrown her guns overboard. On 26 August she anchored near land but the anchors did not hold and on 26 August she grounded at Vlieland. Her crew holed her bottom and threw their remaining arms and ammunition overboard before they went ashore. There Dutch soldiers took them prisoner. (Note: The Dutch released Praed and by 21 August 1799 he was commander of the 16-gun sloop Firm. He eventually became a rear-admiral.) The Dutch took possession of Crash and were able to return her to service.

== Recapture ==
Almost a year after her capture, on 11 August 1799, the 16-gun sloop Pylades, under Captain Adam Mackenzie, the 16-gun brig-sloop Espiegle, under Captain James Boorder, the 12-gun hired cutter Courier, and Juno and Latona, which sent their boats, mounted an attack on Crash, which was moored between the island of Schiermonnikoog and Groningen. At the time of attack, Crash was armed with eight 18-pounders, two 24-pounders and two 32-pounders, all carronades, and had a crew of 60. She was under the command of Lieutenant Bibel.

Pylades and Espiegle engaged Crash, which surrendered after a strong resistance. MacKenzie immediately put Crash into service under Lieutenant James Slade, Latona's first lieutenant. In the attack, Pylades lost one man killed and three wounded. Juno lost one man killed when the boats attacked a gun-schooner.

The next day the British captured one schuyt and burnt a second. MacKenzie put Lieutenant Humphreys of Juno on the captured schuyt after arming her with two 12-pounder carronades and naming her Undaunted.

On 13 August the British attacked the Dutch schooner Vengeance (or Weerwrack or Waarwrick), of six cannons, two of them 24-pounders, and a battery on Schiermonnikoog. The British were able to burn Vengeance and spike the battery's four guns. They also captured a rowboat with 30 men and two brass 4-pounder field pieces, and spiked another 12-pounder. Courier grounded but was saved. Excluding Undaunted, the British captured three schuyts or galiots – Vier Vendou, Jonge Gessina, and one other. The battle would earn those seamen who survived until 1847 the Naval General Service Medal with clasp "Schiermonnikoog 12 Augt. 1799".

Dutch accounts report that Lieutenant van Maaren burnt his ship rather than surrendering it. They further report that the British moved towards the village but that Lieutenant Broers, with 26 men, put up such a defense that after two hours the British withdrew.

== Return to British service ==
Crash was recommissioned under Lieutenant James Slade, who was promoted to commander for his part in the attack. Her hull was coppered in June 1801 and she was recommissioned in August under Lieutenant David Hamline.

== Fate ==
She was sold in September 1802.
