= Samuel Barron (1765–1810) =

American Commodore

- Born: September 25, 1765; Hampton, Virginia
- Died: October 29, 1810 (aged 45)
- Alma mater: College of William & Mary
- Military career
- Allegiance: United States of America
- Branch: United States Navy
- Service years: 1798–1810
- Rank: Commodore (USN)
- Commands: USS Augusta; USS President; Gosport Shipyard
- Conflicts: Quasi-War; First Barbary War

Samuel Barron (September 25, 1765 – October 29, 1810) was a United States Navy officer. He was an older brother of Commodore James Barron, also a US Navy officer.

== Early life ==
Samuel Barron was born in Hampton, Virginia, the son of a merchant captain named James Barron who became Commodore of the tiny Virginia State Navy during the American Revolution. Barron studied at the College of William & Mary, and received his early training at sea from his father. He became a midshipman on the frigate Dragon and served in the Virginia Navy during the latter part of the Revolutionary War. After a number of years as a merchant captain, he joined the fledgling United States Navy.

== Military career ==
In 1798, Barron took part in the Quasi-War with France. He became Captain of the new built brig USS Richmond, originally planned to a merchantman to be called Aurora, in December, 1798. He became Captain of USS Baltimore mid-March 1799. With the resignation of Capt. Thomas Truxton from the Navy he was notified of becoming Captain of the USS Constellation in a letter from Navy Secretary Benjamin Stoddert dated 2 August, 1799. He became Captain of USS Chesapeake in May, 1800. During the First Barbary War, he commanded the President and relieved Edward Preble near Tripoli. During the winter of 1804-1805, yellow fever left Barron laid up. In November 1804, he was transferred to recover on shore but, at his request, retained his command in the hopes of recovering. On 22 May, 1805 he sent a letter to John Rodgers, turning over command of his squadron, and one to the Secretary of the Navy informing him of the change. He returned to the United States due to poor health. He was then assigned command of the Gosport Shipyard in Virginia. His health never fully recovered and on 29 October 1810 Lt. Robert Henley, his executive officer, reported to the Secretary of the Navy "I have the painful duty to inform you of the death of Commodore Samuel Barron. In apparent good health, he was attacked while at dinner yesterday in Hampton with an apoplectic fit and expired about 10 o'clock this morning." Commodore Barron was buried at Hampton Virginia age 45.

Samuel Barron's son, Samuel Barron (1809–1888), served with distinction in the United States Navy, until he resigned his commission in April 1861 to join the Confederate States Navy during the American Civil War.
