= USS Warren (1799) =

Sloop-of-war of the United States Navy

History

United States
- Name: USS Warren
- Namesake: Dr. Joseph Warren (1741-1775), doctor and soldier killed at the Battle of Bunker Hill
- Builder: Webster
- Cost: 34702 dollars
- Launched: 26 september 1799
- Commissioned: Probably November or December 1799
- Fate: Sold by 1 June 1801

General characteristics
- Type: Sloop-of-war
- Tonnage: 360 or 385
- Propulsion: Sails
- Sail plan: Ship-rigged
- Complement: 160
- Armament: 20 guns

The third USS Warren was a sloop-of-war that served in the United States Navy from 1799 to 1801. She was named for Founding Father and American Revolutionary War hero Joseph Warren.

== Construction and commissioning ==
Warren was a copper-sheathed sloop-of-war contracted for at Newburyport, Massachusetts, but actually built by an association of shipbuilders at Salisbury, Massachusetts. On 6 July 1799, while she was still under construction, Secretary of the Navy Benjamin Stoddert ordered Master Commandant Timothy Newman to take command of Warren. The ship was fitted out there, into the winter of 1799, and probably was commissioned in either November or December of 1799.

== Voyage to the Caribbean ==
Assigned the duty of protecting American commerce in Cuban waters against the possible incursions of French warships or privateers during the "Quasi War" with France, Warren set sail for Havana, Cuba, on 31 December 1799, escorting the schooner Trio. Trio was laden with stores for the American men-of-war on the Havana station. As the ships stood out of Nantasket Roads, near Boston, Massachusetts, Sailing Master Joseph Whitmore, in Warren, penned fervently in his journal, "God send us safe to our orders End in our Lawfull (sic) Ways in supporting our Independence."

Trio was separated from Warren about 4 January 1800 or 5 January 1800, and Warren proceeded on independently. The passage proved uneventful until the 17 January 1800, when six men came to Master Commandant Newman's cabin door at 18:30 hours, swearing that "they would not do Duty and . . . would go aboard the first British Man-of-War they could see." According to Whitmore's journal, one of the men wielded the cook's hatchet and all apparently "used other Mutenous (sic) language." As a reward for their behavior, the six were promptly clapped in irons, to stand trial later.

At 13:00 hours on 19 January 1800, Warren spoke with the sloop Mary, 18 days out of Philadelphia, Pennsylvania, and bound for Cuba. Mary needed assistance, and Warren provided her with rigging and the ship's foretopmast stay sail. Three hours later, Warren met the schooner Lucy, 25 days out of Providence, Rhode Island, and took her into the convoy. Warren later passed a hawser to Mary and took her in tow. The three ships remained in company for five days before Warren lost sight of the two merchantmen.

== Caribbean operations ==
Warren reached Havana early in the afternoon of 29 January 1800. Over ensuing days, she supplied the brig USS Norfolk and assisted the brig Fanny, of Salem, Massachusetts, on 11 February 1800. On the morning of 16 February 1800, Warren got underway in company with Norfolk to escort a convoy of 19 merchantmen out of the coastal waters off Havana. Warren remained at sea until 8 March 1800, when she dropped anchor at Matanzas, Cuba, for upkeep and to take on fresh water. She returned to patrol duties off the coast of Cuba at sunrise on 13 March 1800. On 23 March she captured an unidentified American slave ship.

After a week at sea, Warren returned to Havana on 20 February 1800 and waited for a fleet of merchantmen to emerge from the harbor and form a convoy. That evening, a dozen ships sailed, and Warren joined them as they emerged from the harbor and gave them routing instructions as they headed for the United States. Warren remained at sea, on patrol, for another week thereafter, and returned to Havana on 28 February 1800. She stood out to sea again on the morning of 2 April 1800 and proceeded to Matanza where she arrived on 5 April 1800.

Warren joined man-of-war USS Ganges and a convoy of 22 merchantmen on 21 April 1800 and sailed with them for a time before returning to Havana early in May 1800. Sailing again on 5 May 1800, Warren patrolled off the Cuban coast until she arrived at Havana on 23 May 1800.

== Epidemic ==
Warren operated locally between Havana and Matanzas until mid-June 1800 and anchored in Havana harbor on the 15 June 1800. On 24 June 1800, the ship's doctor sent Quarter Gunner William Dogget ashore to the hospital at Havana, the man suffering from a fever—later determined to be yellow fever. Ominously, Dogget's case signified only the beginning of what would become a terrible ordeal for the sloop-of-war Warren.

During Warren's stay at Havana, her crew — hitherto "in general, healthy, and robust" — began to have "evident symptoms of an increasing universal debility." Warren, departing Havana in company with the frigate USS General Greene and 12 merchantmen, sailed for Veracruz, Mexico, on 26 June 1800.

Gunner Dogget, convalescent in the hospital at Havana, was spared seeing the agony of many of his shipmates. For the remainder of June 1800, an average of 15 men per day were incapacitated for performing ship's work. The first fatality occurred shortly before dawn on 30 June 1800, when young Midshipman Jonathan Greenleaf died. Nineteen men, recorded Whitmore, who survived the yellow fever epidemic, were then down with "the fever."

Thirteen more, including the doctor's mate, died before Warren reached Veracruz on 13 July 1800. Warren sent 20 men ashore there, but four died in the ensuing days. Warren ultimately departed Veracruz on 23 July 1800, having had an average of 20 to 24 sick men ashore in the hospital and 25 on board unfit for duty. Whitmore noted on 25 July 1800 that two dozen men were sick but noted optimistically that there were "many mending."

Warren headed back to Havana. Two men died on 27 July 1800, three on the 28 July 1800, and one on 1 August 1800. On 2 August 1800 at 10:00 hours, the captain's only son, John Newman, along on the voyage as a midshipman, died. Warren subsequently anchored at Havana on 15 August 1800, dropping her hook at 11:00 hours. Four hours later, Master Commandant Newman succumbed to the illness that had decimated his crew and killed his only son, when he, too, died. His remains were accordingly sent ashore and interred at Havana. Lieutenant Joseph Strout then took command and took the ship northward, bound for the United States leaving Havana on 17 August, crew very sickly.

Meanwhile, as Warren sailed homeward, Secretary of the Navy Stoddert ordered Captain James Barron to take command of the ship as soon as possible after she arrived, with expressed instructions to "relieve the sick; recruit men to fill the deficiency; cleanse, reprovision, rewater, and prepare her for another cruise with the most dispatch." Stoddert later instructed Barron to provide "all the protection in your power to the vessels which sail under your convoy, and see that as many as may be practicable to their destined ports."

== Later operations ==
Warren arrived at Boston by 23 September, 1800. She subsequently fitted out for another cruise and sailed for the West Indies, where she operated, on patrol and escort duties primarily off Saint Martin and Saint Barthélemy, near Guadeloupe and Haiti, until the "Quasi-War" with France ended early in 1801.

== Decommissioning and disposal ==
Warren returned to the United States to Boston in the spring of 1801 at Boston. In a letter dated 20 February, 1801 to Josiah Parker, Chaiman of the Committee on Naval Affairs, Navy Secretary Stoddert recommended selling her. She was sold in Boston, June 1801 for $19,747.

== See also ==
- List of sailing frigates of the United States Navy
- Naval tactics in the Age of Sail
