= HMS Halifax (1806) =

Sloop of the Royal Navy

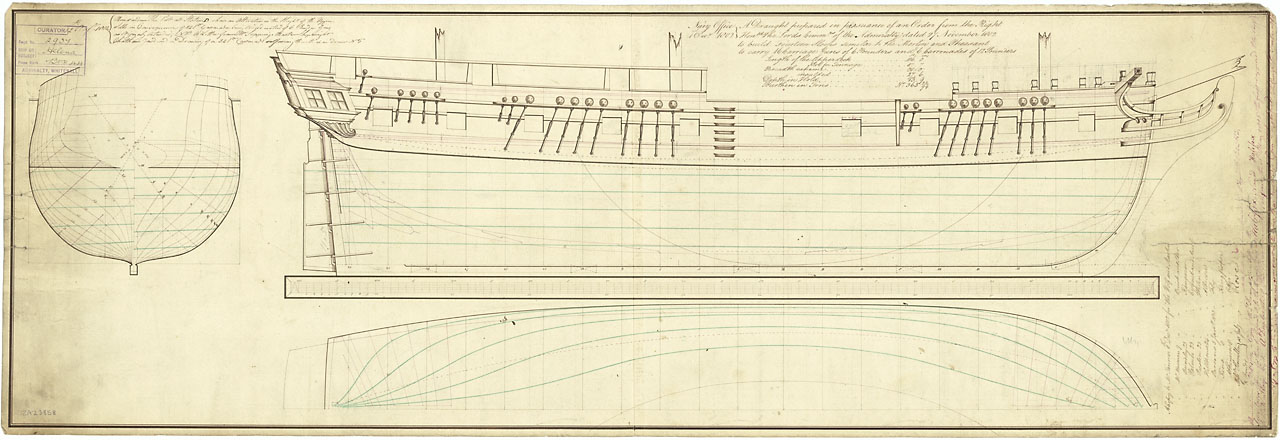
- Halifax

History

United Kingdom
- Name: HMS Halifax
- Namesake: Halifax, Nova Scotia
- Ordered: 27 November 1802
- Builder: Halifax Naval Yard, Master Shipwright William Hughes
- Launched: 11 October 1806
- Fate: Broken up 1814

General characteristics
- Class & type: Merlin-class ship sloop
- Tons burthen: 365 32/94 bm
- Length: 106 ft (32.3 m) (gundeck); 87 ft 7 in (26.7 m) (keel)
- Beam: 28 ft (8.5 m)
- Depth of hold: 13 ft 9 in (4.19 m)
- Sail plan: Full-rigged ship
- Complement: 121
- Armament: 16 × 32-pounder carronades + 2 × 6-pounder bow chasers

HMS Halifax was a ship-rigged sloop of the Merlin class built in 1806 for the British Royal Navy at the Naval Yard in Halifax, Nova Scotia. Built to fill a pressing need for coastal patrol sloops on the North American Station, Halifax was one of the few warships built at Halifax Naval Yard in the Age of Sail as the yard's primary function was supply and refit.

== Service ==
Halifax was commissioned under Commander John Nairne, for the Halifax Station. In November 1806 Commander Lord James Townshend assumed command. A deserter from HMS Halifax, Jenkin Ratford, was one of the men seized from USS Chesapeake in 1807 during the controversial Chesapeake-Leopard Affair. Ratford was hanged from the yardarm of Halifax on 31 August 1807.

Halifax arrived in Plymouth on 16 January 1808 to make good defects. Townshend was promoted to post-captain on 2 January 1809. On 2 March, Halifax, still under Townshend's command, captured a fast, new French schooner, Caroline, which was subsequently commissioned as HMS Caroline. Commander John Thompson replaced Townshend, and then in 1810 Commander Alexander Fraser replaced Thompson, still at Halifax.

== Fate ==
Halifax was laid up in ordinary at Portsmouth from 1812 to 1814. She was broken up in January 1814.
