= William C. Corbitt =

American politician (1854–1922)

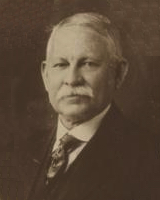
- Corbitt (c. 1916)

Member of the Virginia Senate from the 33rd district
- In office January 13, 1915 – April 22, 1922
- Preceded by: Samuel T. Montague
- Succeeded by: Samuel T. Montague

Personal details
- Born: William Carr Corbitt; March 8, 1854 Suffolk, Virginia, U.S.
- Died: April 22, 1922 (aged 68) Richmond, Virginia, U.S.
- Party: Democratic
- Spouse(s): Nannie Barclay; Jessie Bosworthy Ross

William Carr Corbitt (March 8, 1854 – April 22, 1922) was an American Democratic politician who served as a member of the Virginia Senate from 1915 until his death in 1922.

Senate of Virginia
Preceded by Samuel T. Montague	Virginia Senator for the 33rd District; 1915–1922	Succeeded by Samuel T. Montague
