= Samuel T. Montague =

American politician

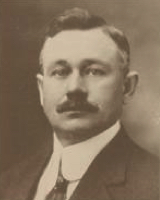

Member of the Virginia Senate from the 33rd district
- In office February 28, 1923 – January 9, 1924
- Preceded by: William C. Corbitt
- Succeeded by: Robert H. Stubbs
- In office January 10, 1912 – June 25, 1914
- Preceded by: John A. Lesner
- Succeeded by: William C. Corbitt

Personal details
- Born: Samuel Tilden Montague; January 12, 1868 Portsmouth, Virginia, U.S.
- Died: September 13, 1939 (aged 71) Portsmouth, Virginia, U.S.
- Party: Democratic
- Spouse: Alma Lorena Grimes

Samuel Tilden Montague (January 12, 1868 – September 13, 1939) was an American Democratic politician who served as a member of the Virginia Senate.

He resigned in 1914 to become postmaster of Portsmouth, Virginia but was selected to fill a vacancy in the seat in 1923 upon the death of his successor, William C. Corbitt.

Senate of Virginia
Preceded by John A. Lesner	Virginia Senator for the 33rd District; 1912–1914	Succeeded by William C. Corbitt
