= HMS Busy (1797) =

Sloop of the British Royal Navy

History

Great Britain
- Name: HMS Busy
- Ordered: 19 December 1796
- Builder: Joseph Graham, Harwich
- Laid down: March 1797
- Launched: 20 November 1797
- Commissioned: December 1797
- Fate: Foundered December 1806

General characteristics
- Type: Brig sloop
- Tons burthen: 33658/94 (bm)
- Length: 96 ft 1 in (29.3 m) (overall); 75 ft 3 in (22.9 m) (keel)
- Beam: 29 ft 0 in (8.8 m)
- Depth of hold: 12 ft 9 in (3.9 m)
- Sail plan: Brig
- Complement: 121
- Armament: 16 × 32-pounder carronades + 2 × 6-pounder chase guns

HMS Busy was launched in 1797 as the only member of her class of brig-sloops. She captured one French privateer and numerous small merchantmen, but spent most of her career escorting convoys to and from the West Indies. She foundered in 1806 while serving on the Halifax, Nova Scotia, station.

== Design ==
Busy was the sole vessel of her class. Her designer was John Henslow, and she was identical with his contemporaneous Echo except that Busy was a brig-sloop and Echo was a ship-sloop. Henslow's designs were in competition with Sir William Rule's designs for a brig-sloop (Cruizer) and a ship-sloop (Snake). Rule's brig-sloop design won as the Admiralty ultimately ordered 106 Cruizer-class brig-sloops.

== Career ==
In December 1797 Commander John Ackworth Ommanney (or Ommaney) commissioned Busy for the North Sea.

On 7 August 1798 Speedwell and Busy intercepted off Goree in the North Sea a Swedish convoy under the escort of HSwMS Ulla Fersen. The British vessels demanded that the Swedes come into port to have their cargo inspected for enemy (French) cargo. Although Sweden was neutral, Ulla Fersen's captain acceded to this demand as the two British vessels out-gunned Ulla Fersen and he wanted to avoid loss of life. As Busy was escorting the Swedish vessels into The Downs they encountered a British squadron that had been searching for the Swedes. Ommanney then turned the convoy over to the British squadron. The Swedish merchant vessels were inspected, one was seized, and the rest departed. The vessel that was seized was Adelarde, and Busy ended up sharing the prize money with at least ten other vessels.

On 29 July 1799 Busy was in company with the hired armed lugger Fox when they captured Der Winter. Then on 2 August they captured Vrow Rica and Neutralitrie and two days later Elizabeth. On 10 August they detained Maximilan Fredericks.

On 16 September 1799 Busy captured the French privateer lugger Dragon, of Dunkirk, as Dragon was coming from Norway. After a short chase along the Dutch coast, Ommaney drove her to anchor in heavy surf about five miles from Egmont. Ten men of her crew that were British subjects tried to escape in one of her boats but eight of the men drowned when the boat upset in the surf. Dragon, Citizen Liard, master, was armed with two with two 12-pounder carronades and fourteen 4-pounder guns, eight of which she had thrown overboard during the chase. (Note: Dragon had been commissioned in July 1798.) Ommaney sent Dragon into Yarmouth.

Then Busy took part in the Anglo-Russian invasion of Holland in 1799. On 28 August 1799, the fleet captured several Dutch hulks and ships in the New Diep, in Holland. Babet was listed among the vessels qualifying to share in the prize money. Similarly, Busy was present at the subsequent Vlieter Incident on 30 August.

Between November and December Busy was back with her builders who were making good defects in her construction that had been discovered.

On 7 February 1800 Busy arrived at Portsmouth with a large convoy from The Downs. Then on 13 February Busy sailed for the Leeward Islands as one of the escorts for a fleet of 150 merchantmen.

While Ommanney was on the Leeward Island's Station, Busy captured or recaptured five vessels:

Sometime after 22 April she captured American ship "Gadsden" under pretense of carrying illicit cargo and was sent to St. Kitts, where she was released.

- 26 April: sloop Lover, of 98 tons (bm) and 7 men. She was of Saint croix and was sailing from Guadeluope to saint Croix with sugar and wine when busy captured her.
- 10 May: schooner Wheel of Fortune, of 34 tons (bm) and 6 men. She was sailing from Saint Bartholomew to Sandy Point, st Kitts, with a cargo of sundries.
- 12 May: schooner Confiance, of 52 tons and 11 men. She was of and from Saint Bartholomew and was sailing to Cayenne with naval stores.
- 26 May: ship Britannia, of 220 tons (bm) and 11 men. She was of and from New Brunswick and before Busy recaptured her she had been captured while sailing to Jamaica with lumber.
- 19 June: schooner Industry, of 69 tons (bm) and 6 men. She was of Middleton, North America, and before Busy recaptured her she had been sailing from New London to Martinique with a cargo of cattle when she had been captured.

By July Ommanney's health had deteriorated and he returned to England. The homeward fleet of 170 merchant vessels sailed from Jamaica on 1 August under escort by HMS Queen, Busy, and two frigates. Lieutenant Viscount Falkland assumed command of Busy in September. He received promotion to commander in January 1801. He captured San Telmo, which was condemned at Martinique and sold at Trinidad on 21 September.

Circa 25 May 1802 Lieutenant G. Chamberlayne of Theseus, was appointed to command Busy pro tempore. However, Chamberlyne died. A letter from Antigua dated 21 November reported that he had succumbed to yellow fever and that Lieutenant Thomas Church, of Excellent had replaced him in command of Busy.

Following the Peace of Amiens in March 1802, there was an announcement on 21 July that when they arrived from Jamaica, eight sail of the line, four frigates, and five sloops, including Busy, would be laid up at Plymouth Dockyard.

On 22 March 1803 Lieutenant Timothy Clinch was promoted to commander. He assumed command of Busy, either in conjunction with his promotion or not long thereafter. Her role was the protection of the trade to Halifax, Nova Scotia, and Newfoundland.

Still, on 4 May 1803 Busy arrived at Barbados from Antigua. She sailed from there on 1 August as escort for the Leeward Islands convoy. On the way the convoy encountered a gale. The ships Eagle and Stanley were lost, though their crews were saved. Busy parted from the convoy and there were reports that she too had been lost. However, on 4 October The Times of London reported that Busy had arrived at Cork.

On 24 October Busy, with the convoy for Newfoundland and Halifax, got under weigh at Portsmouth but brought to again when the wind dropped. They all sailed the following day with Diligente in company.

Busy returned to Portsmouth on 28 November. She sailed for a cruise off Cherbourg with Tribune and Pluto on 27 January 1804 and returned on 12 February.

Captain Clinch sailed from Portsmouth for West Indies station on 13 April 1804. On 10 June he arrived at Barbados from Falmouth, having escorted about 46 vessels. On the 25th of June Busy recaptured an English ship with a cargo of sundries.

On 4 September 1804 Lieutenant William Henry Byam, of Osprey received a promotion to commander and on 1 December he took command of Busy on the Halifax station. At the same time Commander Timothy Clinch moved to Osprey. Byam left Busy in October 1805 for Bermuda.

Busy remained on the Halifax station and from 1806 she was under the command of Lieutenant Richard Keilly.

== Fate ==
Busy, Lieutenant Richard Keilly, parted from a convoy on 4 December 1806, having left Halifax the previous day. She was not seen again and was presumed to have foundered with all hands.
