= Timeline of the John Adams presidency =

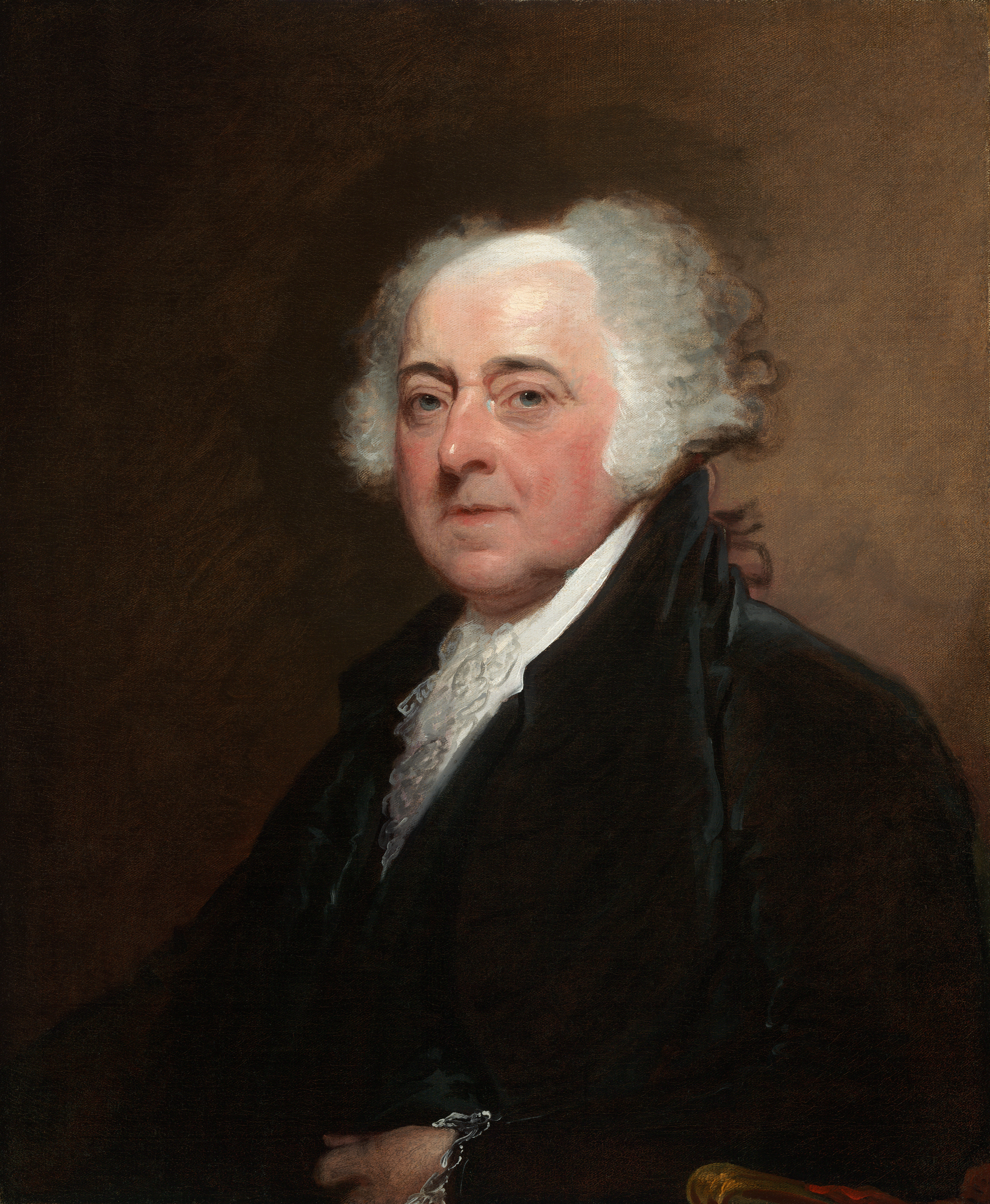
John Adams

The presidency of John Adams began on March 4, 1797, when John Adams was inaugurated as the 2nd president of the United States, and ended on March 4, 1801. The first year of his presidency focused on negotiations with the French government to avoid armed conflict as relations between France and the United States deteriorated, but negotiations failed when French officials demanded bribes from the delegation in what became known as the XYZ Affair. The Quasi-War, a series of skirmishes between France and the United States, occurred in 1798. Adams implemented the Alien and Sedition Acts that placed restrictions on foreign nationals and criminalized criticism of his administration. He faced growing backlash from both the opposing Democratic-Republican Party and the High Federalist faction within his own Federalist Party. While the conflict was ongoing, Adams established relations with the French colony of Saint-Domingue under the rule of Toussaint Louverture.

Adams organized a new delegation to France in 1799. His cabinet underwent changes in 1800 when his Secretary of War, James McHenry, resigned, and Adams removed his Secretary of State, Timothy Pickering. These actions, along with the dissolution of an army led by his rival Alexander Hamilton, effectively ended Hamilton's influence in government. Adams lost the 1800 presidential election to Thomas Jefferson and spent his final month as president reshaping the federal judiciary by issuing a large number of nominations to judicial positions through the Judiciary Act of 1801.

== 1797 ==
=== March 1797 ===
- March 4 – John Adams is inaugurated as the 2nd president of the United States by Chief Justice Oliver Ellsworth in Congress Hall. He retains the cabinet members of his predecessor, George Washington. Thomas Jefferson becomes vice president of the United States.
- March 5 – Adams suggests to his treasury secretary Oliver Wolcott Jr. that they work with Thomas Jefferson and James Madison to form a bipartisan commission to negotiate with France. This causes an argument between Adams and Wolcott.
- March 8 – George Washington departs from Philadelphia, Pennsylvania, then the capital of the United States.
- March 14 – Adams learns that diplomat Charles Cotesworth Pinckney had not been accepted by the French Directory. He meets with his cabinet to discuss the United States' response.
- March 21 – Adams moves into what was then the presidential residence in Philadelphia. He finds its condition and budget significantly below what he considers necessary.
- March 25 – Following French attacks on American ships, Adams schedules a special session of the United States Congress for May 15 to address deteriorating relations between France and the United States. The Democratic-Republican Party protests, fearing that Adams intends to declare war on France.
- March 29 – The United States enters into a treaty with the Mohawk people.

=== April 1797 ===
- April 14 – Adams initiates a new discussion with his cabinet regarding a response to France's attacks against American ships.
- April 21 – Adams's mother Susanna Boylston dies.

=== May 1797 ===
- May 10
  - Adams's wife Abigail Adams arrives in Philadelphia.
  - The USS United States, the first of the original six frigates authorized for the United States Navy, launches at Philadelphia.
- May 15 – The 5th United States Congress convenes for its first session.
- May 16 – Adams addresses a joint session of Congress to discuss defense of the East Coast from French attack. The speech is criticized by the Jeffersonians and their Democratic-Republican Party, who see it as warmongering and as demonstrating sympathies toward the British. France later demands an apology for Adams's criticism of the nation.
- May 31 – Adams nominates Francis Dana, John Marshall, and Charles Cotesworth Pinckney as a delegation to France.

=== June 1797 ===
- June 5 – The United States Senate confirms Adams's nominations for the Pinckney delegation to France.
- June 7 – French philosopher Constantin François de Chassebœuf, comte de Volney, an ally of Thomas Jefferson, flees the United States.
- June 10 – The Treaty of Peace and Friendship between the United States and Tripoli, which had been signed during Washington's presidency, enters into force.
- June 12 – Adams delivers a message to Congress recommending the establishment of Natchez as a separate territory. It will eventually be created as the Mississippi Territory.
- June 20
  - Adams nominates Elbridge Gerry for the Pinckney delegation to France after Dana declines.
  - William Vans Murray becomes Minister Resident to the Netherlands, succeeding Adams's son John Quincy Adams.
- June 22 – The Senate confirms Gerry's appointment to the Pinckney delegation.
- June 24 – Adams signs a bill allowing him to command state governments to raise militias of 80,000 men.

=== July 1797 ===
- July 4 – William Blount is expelled from the United States Senate.
- July 10 – The 5th United States Congress adjourns from its first session. Several members of the Federalist Party express reservations about Adams's proposed defense initiatives, and the session ends without their passage despite the Federalists' majority.
- July 19 – Adams departs from Philadelphia for the summer. He goes to his home in Quincy, Massachusetts.
- July 20 – Marshall departs from Philadelphia on his way to France.
- July 22 – Adams establishes the United States Mint and ends the recognition of foreign currencies as legal tender.
- July 23 – Gerry departs from Boston, Massachusetts, on his way to France.
- July 25 – David Humphreys ends his tenure as Minister Resident to Portugal.
- July 26 – Adams's son John Quincy Adams marries Louisa Catherine Johnson, though Adams is not informed of this for another two months.

=== August 1797 ===
- August 28 – The United States and Tunis enter into a commerce treaty.

=== September 1797 ===
- September 4 – A coup takes place in France, replacing the government with one more hostile to the United States.
- September 7 – The USS Constellation, the second of the original six frigates authorized for the United States Navy, launches at Baltimore.
- September 8 – William Loughton Smith becomes Minister Plenipotentiary to Portugal.
- September 10 – David Humphreys, former minister to Portugal, becomes Minister Plenipotentiary to Spain.
- September 15 – The United States enters into a treaty with the Seneca people.
- September 27 – Marshall and Pinckney arrive in Paris to negotiate with the French government.

=== October 1797 ===
- October – Adams departs from Quincy, but he is forced to stop upon learning of an outbreak of yellow fever in Philadelphia. He stays with his daughter Nabby over the following weeks.
- October 4 – Gerry arrives in France to meet with the other members of the Pinckney delegation.
- October 8 – The Pinckney delegation informally meets with French foreign minister Charles Maurice de Talleyrand-Périgord.
- October 18 – In what came to be known as the XYZ Affair, Baron Jean-Conrad Hottinguer solicits a bribe from the Pinckney delegation if they are to be allowed to negotiate with Talleyrand.
- October 20 – Hottinguer and his associate Pierre Bellamy meet with the Pinckney delegation and they insist on a bribe.
- October 21
  - Discussion resumes in France where Bellamy proposes that the United States accept a loan from the Dutch in addition to his request of a bribe. Gerry convinces his fellow diplomats to keep negotiating and they decide that, in exchange for the end of French hostilities, they are willing to inform the United States of the loan offer.
  - The USS Constitution, the third of the original six frigates authorized for the United States Navy, launches at Boston.
- October 22 – The Pinckney delegation sends its first messages back to the United States reporting on the status of negotiations.
- October 28 – Gerry meets with Talleyrand and his associate Lucien Hauteval. Hauteval insists on a bribe if the Pinckney delegation is to stay in France. They refuse when it is made clear that French hostilities would continue even if the bribe was paid.

=== November 1797 ===
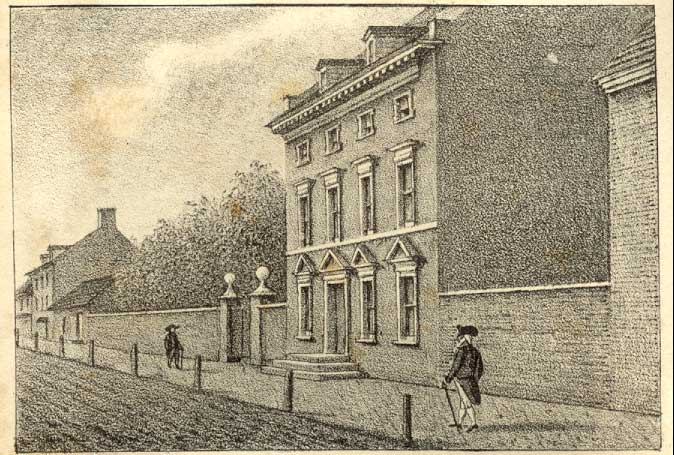
The President's House in Philadelphia

- November – Adams arrives in Philadelphia. He is afflicted by a cold and rests for a week as a precautionary measure.
- November 13 – The 5th United States Congress convenes for its second session.
- November 22 – Adams delivers the 1797 State of the Union Address. He talks about national defense and says it should be funded by taxes instead of loans.
- November 28 – Adams formally expresses his belief to the Senate that a merchant navy should be established.

=== December 1797 ===
- December 5 – Adams's son John Quincy Adams becomes Minister Plenipotentiary to Prussia.
- December 6 – Adams addresses Congress in another controversial call to action against France that is criticized by the Jeffersonians.

== 1798 ==
=== January 1798 ===
- January 8 – The Eleventh Amendment to the United States Constitution is ratified, granting states sovereign immunity in federal court.
- January 17 – Adams forms a commission to negotiate a treaty with the Cherokee Nation.
- January 18 – France issues a decree to take a hostile stance toward American shipping.
- January 24 – Adams sends requests to his cabinet members, seeking advice as to whether the United States should align with the Kingdom of Great Britain in the event of war with France.
- January 31 – Marshall sends a formal message to the French foreign office, co-signed by the other two members of the Pinckney delegation, laying out the grievances of the American government and expressing a desire to avoid war. The message is dated January 17, but Gerry's reservations had caused a delay in its signing.

=== February 1798 ===
- February – Adams reports to Congress that a French privateer attacked a British merchant ship in Charleston Harbor.
- February 15 – Secretary of War James McHenry sends a peace plan to Adams. The plan was written by Hamilton, but McHenry presents it as his own.

=== March 1798 ===
- March 2 – The Pinckney delegation is able to meet with Talleyrand.
- March 4 – Adams receives letters from the Pinckney delegation to France describing the XYZ affair.
- March 5 – Adams delivers the initial uncoded letter about the XYZ affair to Congress. Coded messages have yet to be decoded.
- March 6 – The Pinckney delegation meets with Talleyrand for the final time.
- March 12 – The final letter to Adams about the XYZ affair is decoded.
- March 13 – Adams consults with his cabinet to decide whether to share the full news of the XYZ affair with Congress and whether to propose a declaration of war.
- March 15 – A treaty is signed with Great Britain amending article 5 of the Jay Treaty.
- March 19
  - Adams reports to Congress that negotiations with France were unsuccessful. He does not disclose the nature of the XYZ affair. In his speech, he argues that the problems in France are Europe's concern and that the United States should not become involved.
  - Talleyrand responds to the Pinckney delegation's list of grievances by issuing a public statement to the American people denouncing the Adams administration.
- March 23 – Adams sends an order that the Pinckney delegation should return if negotiations had not begun.
- March 27 – The Democratic–Republican Party introduces the Sprigg Resolutions in an effort to limit American military activity against France, but they are unsuccessful.
- March 30 – Congressman William Branch Giles introduces a resolution demanding release of the Pinckney delegation's reports.

=== April 1798 ===
- April 2 – Representative Albert Gallatin, leader of the Democratic-Republicans, speaks in the House of Representatives to demand Adams release the Pinckney delegation's messages. The House votes to approve Giles' resolution ordering the release of its reports as well as its original instructions, with 65 in favor and 27 opposed.
- April 3 – Adams reports the XYZ affair to Congress, detailing attempts by the French government to solicit bribes from the Pinckney delegation. He uses the letters W, X, Y, and Z to describe the French officials instead of identifying them by name.
- April 6 – The House of Representatives votes to release the communications associated with the XYZ affair.
- April 7 – Adams signs a bill to create the Mississippi Territory and ban the importation of foreign slaves into the territory. He names Natchez as its capital and appoints Winthrop Sargent as its governor.
- April 8 – Representative Samuel Sewall introduces a bill that would implement Adams's desired naval defenses and a provisional army.
- April 11 – Adams nominates John Sloss Hobart to serve on the U.S. District Court for the District of New York.
- April 24 – Marshall departs from Bordeaux on a return trip to the United States.
- April 25 – The performer Gilbert Fox premieres the song "Hail, Columbia" by Joseph Hopkinson in a theater on Chestnut Street. Abigail Adams is in attendance, and John Adams attends a performance a few days later.
- April 27 – Congress permits Adams to organize a fleet of 12 gunboats.
- April 30 – Adams signs a bill creating the Department of the Navy.

=== May 1798 ===
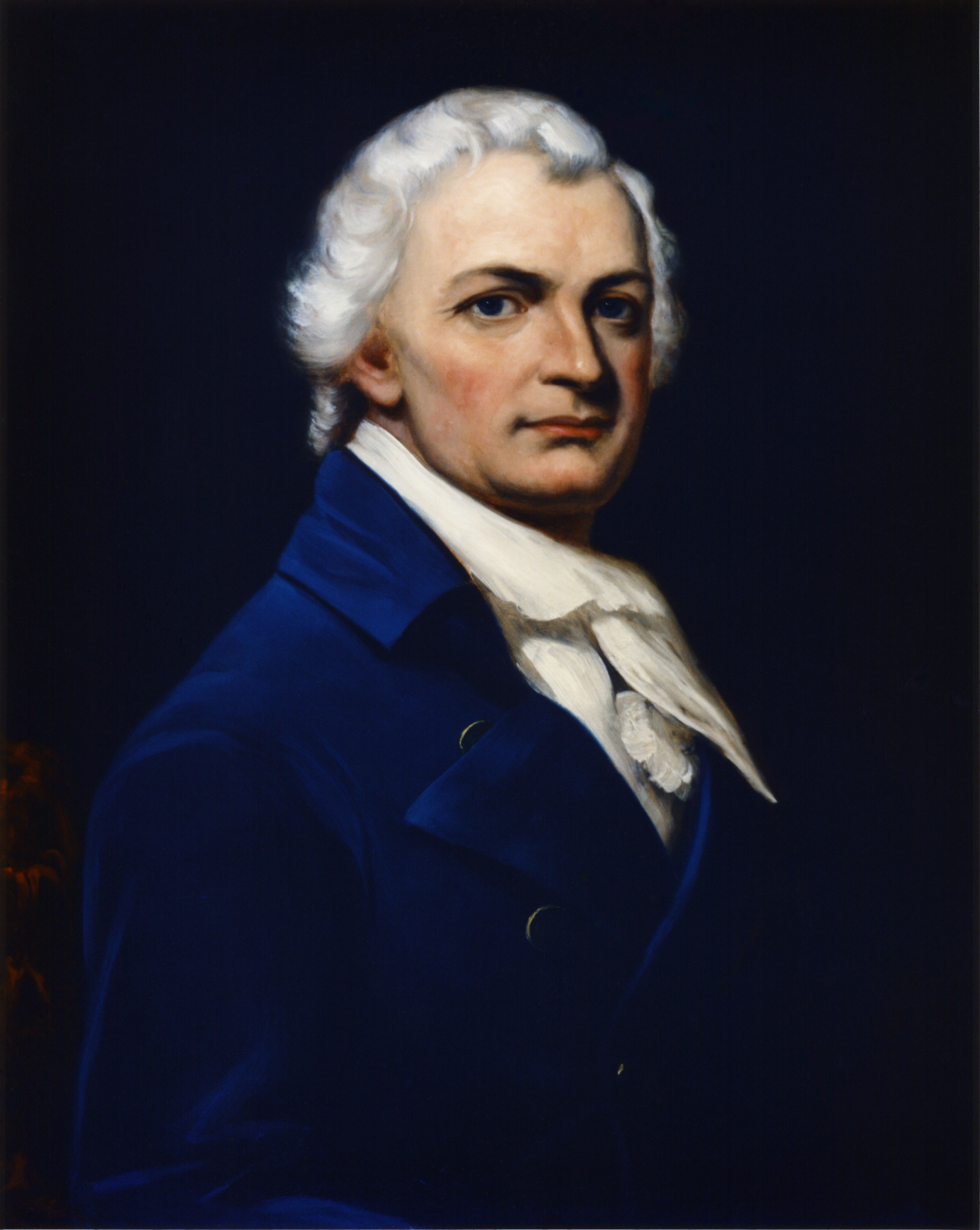
Benjamin Stoddert was confirmed as the first Secretary of the Navy on May 21, 1798.

- May – Congress and the public increasingly support the creation of an army as rumors spread that France is building an invasion force and engaging in covert actions within the United States.
- May 3
  - Adams appoints Benjamin Stoddert as the first Secretary of the Navy.
  - The Navy purchases the frigate USS Baltimore and the man-of-war USS Ganges.
- May 4
  - A Senate committee releases a report proposing the creation of what became the Alien and Sedition Acts.
  - A law is passed authorizing the procurement of weapons for the military.
- May 5 – The Navy purchases the USS Delaware, which was previously a merchant ship.
- May 9 – A National Day of Prayer is held at Adams's request.
- May 15 – France bans American ships from French military ports.
- May 21 – The Senate confirms the appointment of Stoddert as Secretary of the Navy.
- May 24 – The man-of-war USS Ganges is sent to protect the coast against French attack. No combat takes place.
- May 27 – French newspapers report that the XYZ affair has been made public in the United States, effectively ending negotiations between the countries.
- May 28
  - Adams is authorized to raise a federal army of 10,000 men in the event of an invasion. He is also granted the power to authorize seizure of French vessels that attack American merchantmen.
  - The French government receives the XYZ affair correspondences.

=== June 1798 ===
- June 1 – The United States enters into a treaty with the Oneida people.
- June 12
  - Adams receives a letter from his Minister Resident to the Netherlands, William Vans Murray, reporting that Elbridge Gerry had stayed in Paris to continue negotiations after the other two members of the Pinckney delegation, John Marshall and Charles Cotesworth Pinckney, had left.
  - George Logan departs from the United States in secret to negotiate with France on behalf of the United States as a private citizen.
- June 13 – A law is passed making it illegal for Americans to engage in trade with France, effective July 1.
- June 18
  - Adams signs the first of four Alien and Sedition Acts: the Amendments to the Naturalization Act of 1795. This requires that non-citizen residents must register themselves and bars citizenship for people from nations at war with the United States. It sets naturalization requirements that residents must live in the United States and declare their intention to seek citizenship for five years before they are eligible.
  - Benjamin Stoddert takes his position as first Secretary of the Navy.
- June 19 – John Marshall arrives in Philadelphia after leaving France.
- June 21 – Adams delivers a message to Congress, declaring that he "will never send another minister to France without assurances that he will be received, respected, and honored as the representative of a great, free, powerful, and independent nation". Adams's rival High Federalists see this as provoking war.
- June 25
  - Adams signs the second of four Alien and Sedition Acts: the Alien Act. This gives him the power to deport any non-citizen resident he deems a threat to the United States.
  - A law is passed authorizing American merchant ships to carry weapons and defend themselves from French attack.
  - Adams and Pickering condemn Gerry for negotiating unilaterally after the other members of the Pinckney delegation had departed from France.
- June 26
  - William Vans Murray meets informally with French diplomat Louis-André Pichon in The Hague.
  - Newspaper editor Benjamin Franklin Bache is arrested for libel against the president. He will die before reaching trial.
  - The Navy purchases the USS Montezuma, which was previously a merchant ship.

=== July 1798 ===
- July – Journalist John Daly Burk is arrested for libel against the president. He is released on the condition that he leaves the country, but he goes into hiding in Virginia for the remainder of Adams's term.
- July 1 – The Federalists try and fail to gain the votes for a declaration of war against France.
- July 2 – Adams nominates George Washington to be lieutenant general and commander-in-chief of the army. Adams also submits the names of other political figures to be generals, including Aaron Burr, Alexander Hamilton, and William Stephens Smith.
- July 3 – The Senate confirms Washington's appointment as commander-in-chief of the army.
- July 4 – Federalists in Congress meet to discuss whether they should push for a declaration of war against France, but they lack the votes when moderate Federalists choose not to support it.
- July 6 – Adams signs the third of four Alien and Sedition Acts: the Alien Enemies Act. This legalizes the arrest or deportation of men from nations that are enemies of the United States.
- July 7
  - The USS Delaware captures the French schooner Croyable. The Croyable is renamed to the USS Retaliation.
  - Adams signs a bill voiding all treaties between France and the United States.
  - Adams formally names Washington commander-in-chief of the army.
- July 9
  - The Quasi-War begins when Adams signs a bill granting all American vessels legal authority to capture armed French vessels anywhere in the ocean.
  - The French government places an embargo on American ships in French ports.
- July 11 – The United States Marine Corps is established.
- July 13 – Washington accepts Adams's nomination as commander-in-chief.
- July 14
  - Adams signs the fourth and final of the Alien and Sedition Acts: the Sedition Act. This criminalizes false or malicious statements about the government, obstruction of government operations, and incitement of insurrection or unlawful assembly. It enables the Adams administration to penalize criticism against it.
  - Adams signs a bill setting taxes on dwellings, land, and slaves so as to fund military preparation amid tensions with France.
- July 16
  - Adams signs a bill expanding the army.
  - The 5th United States Congress convenes from its second session.
- July 17 – Congress convenes for a two-day special session.
- July 18 – Adams appoints 14 officers to the army. This includes his rival Alexander Hamilton, whom he appoints inspector general.
- July 22 – Talleyrand requests further negotiations with Gerry, giving up previous requests of a loan and an explanation of Adams's criticism of France.
- July 25 – Adams departs from Philadelphia for the summer.
- July 26 – Gerry departs from Paris.
- July 31 – The French government reverses its policy against American shipping.

=== August 1798 ===
- August 7 – George Logan arrives in Paris to negotiate with the French government.
- August 8
  - John and Abigail Adams arrive in Quincy. Abigail had become seriously ill amid an outbreak of yellow fever and would require rest over the following months. John continues working in the room across the hall.
  - Gerry departs from Le Havre to return to the United States.
- August 14 – Adams declines Hamilton's request to call him and Henry Knox into duty as generals, citing issues of seniority that had yet to be resolved.
- August 16 – The French government lifts its embargo against American ships.
- August 23 – The USS United States and the USS Delaware capture the French schooner Sans Pareil off the coast of Martinique.
- August 29 – Logan departs from Paris to return to the United States.

=== September 1798 ===
- September 5 – The USS United States and the USS Delaware capture the French sloop Jaloux off the coast of Puerto Rico.
- September 9 – The brig USS Norfolk is declared ready for sea except for the officers besides its captain.
- September 29 – Adams places Bushrod Washington on the Supreme Court through a recess appointment to succeed James Wilson.

=== October 1798 ===
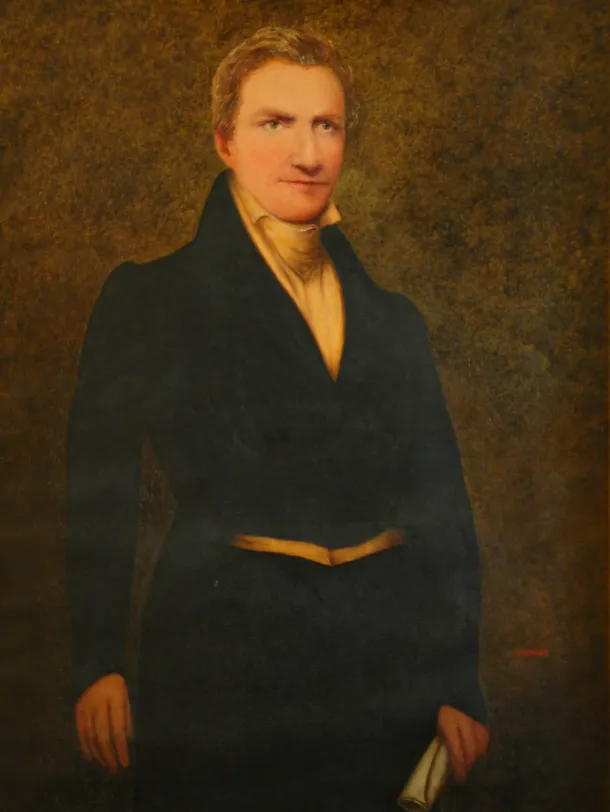
Congressman Matthew Lyon was arrested under the Sedition Act for his criticism of John Adams.

- October 1 – Elbridge Gerry returns to the United States from France. He reports that France is open to peace.
- October 2 – The United States enters into a treaty with the Cherokee Nation.
- October 4 – Adams and Gerry have a meeting in Quincy.
- October 6 – Congressman Matthew Lyon is arrested for violating the Sedition Act.
- October 8 – Adams receives a letter from George Washington, in which Washington demands the ability to select his own general staff if he is to remain commander-in-chief of the army. Adams sends a letter accepting these terms despite his displeasure with Washington's choice of Hamilton as inspector general.
- October 9 – Congressman Lyon is sentenced to four months in prison and ordered to pay $1,000 (equivalent to $19,355 in 2025) plus court costs. Despite being imprisoned during the election, he will be re-elected to Congress.
- October 12
  - The Navy purchases the USS George Washington, which was previously a merchant ship.
  - The USS Merrimack launches at Newburyport, Massachusetts.
- October 20 – Adams requests input from his cabinet on whether to seek peace or war with France.
- October 25 – Commissioners appointed by Great Britain and the United States define the St. Croix River boundary between Maine and Nova Scotia, ending a dispute that began in 1764.

=== November 1798 ===
- November 6 – Toussaint Louverture, the autonomous leader of the French colony Saint-Domingue, guarantees protection to American ships engaging in commerce in Saint-Domingue despite the French embargo.
- November 10
  - Thomas Jefferson anonymously publishes the Kentucky Resolution condemning the Sedition Act as abuse of power.
  - George Washington arrives in Philadelphia in his capacity as commander-in-chief of the army.
  - Logan returns to Philadelphia following his attempt to negotiate with France as a private citizen.
- November 12 – Adams departs from Quincy with his nephew William Smith Shaw while Abigail remains behind to recover from her illness.
- November 16
  - The government of Kentucky adopts the Kentucky Resolution.
  - The British HMS Carnatic intercepts and searches the USS Baltimore sloop-of-war. Adams dismisses the ship's captain, Isaac Phillips, for allowing the search to take place without resistance.
- November 20 – The French frigates L'Insurgente and Volontaire capture the American schooner USS Retaliation (previously the French Croyable) off the coast of the Leeward Islands.
- November 25 – Adams returns to the capital in Philadelphia. He meets with his cabinet to consider whether a new delegation should be sent to France or if war should be declared.
- November 26 – Adams meets with Logan to discuss his negotiations with France.

=== December 1798 ===
- December – The brig USS Richmond departs from Hampton Roads after being purchased by the Navy while under construction.
- December 3 – The 5th United States Congress convenes for its third session.
- December 4 – George Washington departs from Philadelphia.
- December 8 – Adams delivers the 1798 State of the Union Address. Congress's failure to reach a quorum prevented him from delivering the speech five days before.
- December 19
  - Adams nominates his recess appointee Bushrod Washington to a permanent seat on the Supreme Court.
  - Adams hosts Joseph Bunel, a diplomat from Saint-Domingue, to negotiate trade despite the French embargo. Bunel is the first black man to dine with an American president.
- December 21 – James Madison anonymously publishes the Virginia Resolution condemning the Alien and Sedition Acts as abuse of power.
- December 24 – The government of Virginia adopts the Virginia Resolution.

== 1799 ==
=== January 1799 ===
- January – Federal tax collectors are forcefully resisted by the people of Bucks County, Pennsylvania.
- January 15 – Adams reunites with his son Thomas Boylston Adams after the latter spent five years in Europe. He brings news to his father about the ongoing negotiations in France.
- January 18 – Congress receives the diplomatic letters of Elbridge Gerry.
- January 21 – The frigate USS General Greene launches at Warren, Rhode Island.
- January 24 – Over a period of four days, William Duane, a journalist critical of Adams, publishes Gerry's diplomatic letters in the Philadelphia Aurora to advocate for peace between the United States and France.
- January 30 – As a response to Logan's unauthorized trip to France, Adams signs the Logan Act into law, making it a crime to negotiate with foreign governments on behalf of the United States as a private citizen.

=== February 1799 ===
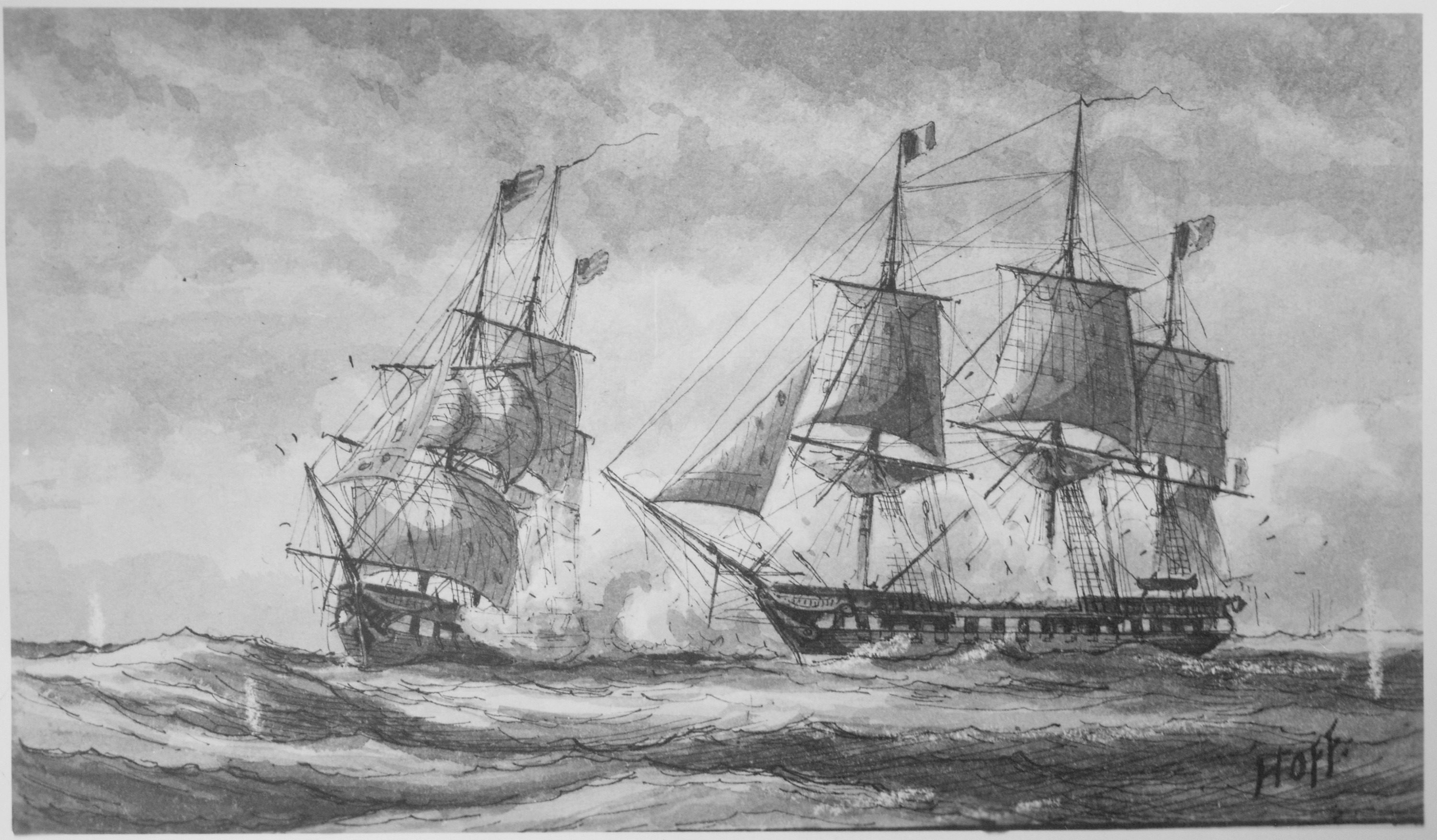
The USS Constellation engages in combat with L'Insurgente

- February 2 – Adams releases the report from Elbridge Gerry about the diplomatic situation in France.
- February 3 – The USS United States captures the French schooner L'Amour de la Patrie off the coast of Martinique.
- February 4 – The USS United States captures the French privateer Tartuffe in the Saint Lucia Channel.
- February 6 – The United States' commerce treaty with Sweden expires. Its partial renewal will not take place until 1816.
- February 9
  - The USS Constellation, commanded by Thomas Truxtun, wins a battle and captures the French L'Insurgente. L'Insurgente had previously attacked several American merchant ships. The battle, taking place off the coast of Nevis, is the first major battle of the Quasi–War. L'Insurgente is renamed as the USS Insurgent.
  - A law is passed authorizing Adams to resume trade with Saint-Domingue at his discretion.
- February 18 – Against the wishes of his party, Adams announces his intention to form a new delegation to France. He nominates William Vans Murray as its leader. Adams decides not to send the Vans Murray delegation until he can confirm that France is open to negotiation.
- February 22 – At the request of Secretary of State Timothy Pickering, the Danish ship Minerva is boarded to investigate French official Matthew Salmon when it reaches Charleston. The ship, with a secret compartment containing French documents, is carrying Salmon and four other French citizens. Pickering argues without evidence that this was part of a French plot to foment a slave rebellion.
- February 23 – Adams meets with a commission of his rival High Federalists, led by Theodore Sedgwick. They negotiate Adams's decision to appoint William Vans Murray in the new delegation to France. Adams agrees to negotiate on the condition that their meeting not be included in the report, fearing that such collaboration might be unconstitutional.
- February 25
  - At the urging of the High Federalists, Adams agrees to nominate Oliver Ellsworth and Patrick Henry to the delegation alongside William Vans Murray. He rejects their original proposal of Alexander Hamilton and George Cabot.
  - Adams signs the nation's first quarantine law. It authorizes the Secretary of the Treasury to regulate cooperation between the government and state health officials, and it sets regulations on how ships and revenue cutters are to respond to epidemics.
  - The necessity of lumber for naval purposes leads to Adams signing the first American law governing forests.
- February 27 – The Senate confirms Adams's nominations for the delegation to France. Henry will later decline the nomination for health reasons and be replaced by William Richardson Davie.

=== March 1799 ===
- March 1 – The USS Montezuma captures the French brigadier Les Amis in the waters south of Puerto Rico.
- March 3
  - A law is passed mandating punishment of French prisoners as retaliation for the conditions of American prisoners in France.
  - The 5th United States Congress adjourns from its third session.
- March 5 – The USS Delaware captures the French schooner Marsouin off the coast of Matanzas, Cuba.
- March 6 – Farmers in the Pennsylvania Dutch community begin Fries's Rebellion, an armed uprising against federal tax collectors in Bucks County, Pennsylvania. Eighteen people are arrested.
- March 7 – John Fries, the leader of Fries's Rebellion, leads 150 men to Bethlehem, Pennsylvania, where they force a marshal to release three people who had been arrested for not paying the federal tax.
- March 10 – Adams holds a cabinet meeting in his home to discuss what terms for peace they would demand from France.
- March 12
  - Adams issues a proclamation declaring the actions of Fries's Rebellion to be treason and orders the rebels to disperse. He authorizes military force to end the rebellion.
  - Adams departs from Philadelphia for his home in Quincy, Massachusetts. The cabinet objects, feeling that Adams is neglecting his duty.
- March 14
  - The USS Constellation captures the French schooner Union off the coast of Guadeloupe.
  - Edme Étienne Borne Desfourneaux, the French governor of Guadeloupe, unilaterally orders that American ships be captured and brought to Guadeloupe.

=== April 1799 ===
- April 18 – Edward Stevens arrives in Cap Francais as the United States's Counsul General to Saint-Domingue. He is tasked with opening trade and helping Saint-Domingue distance itself from France.
- April 20 – The United States and Great Britain negotiate an agreement on their approach to Saint-Domingue.

=== May 1799 ===
- May – Harrison Gray Otis begins publishing the "Envoy" series in Boston to express support for Adams.
- May 5 – William Vans Murray expresses to the French government Adams's intention to reestablish negotiations.
- May 15
  - John Fries and two associates are found guilty of treason for rebelling against federal taxes. Their conviction is later voided by a technicality and a second trial is scheduled.
  - Talleyrand orders that Americans in French ports are not to be taken prisoner.
- May 20 – The frigate USS Boston launches at Boston.
- May 22 – Saint-Domingue accepts the proposal formed by the United States and Great Britain and agrees not to attack or capture American or British possessions.

=== June 1799 ===
- June – The USS Merrimack captures the French schooner Magicienne, which had previously been the French Croyable and the USS Retaliation.
- June 3 – The sloop-of-war USS Maryland launches at Baltimore.
- June 5 – The frigate USS John Adams launches at Charleston, South Carolina.
- June 6 – The USS Connecticut is launched at Middletown, Connecticut.
- June 8 – The frigate USS Adams launches at New York.
- June 18 – A coup takes place in France, replacing the government.
- June 20 – The sloop-of-war USS Patapsco is launched as the USS Chesapeake.
- June 23 – Adams lifts the American embargo on Saint-Domingue.
- June 30 – The brig USS Augusta is launched at Norfolk, Virginia.

=== July 1799 ===
- July 6 – The sloop-of-war USS Warren is given a captain before construction is completed.
- July 7 – Talleyrand orders the release of Americans being held in France.
- July 11 – The Treaty of Amity is signed between Prussia and the United States. This revives the treaty that had expired in 1796.

=== August 1799 ===
- August 6 – Adams receives the final plea for peace from Talleyrand before the latter's replacement by Charles-Frédéric Reinhard.
- August 15 – The USS Congress, the fourth of the original six frigates authorized for the United States Navy, launches at Boston.
- August 22 – The brig USS Pickering, previously a ship of the United States Revenue Cutter Service, departs from Boston on its first cruise for the Navy.

=== September 1799 ===
- September 9 – Three naval squadrons, each made up of one frigate and five brigs, are launched.
- September 30
  - Adams departs from his home in Quincy.
  - The frigate USS Essex launches at Salem, Massachusetts.

=== October 1799 ===
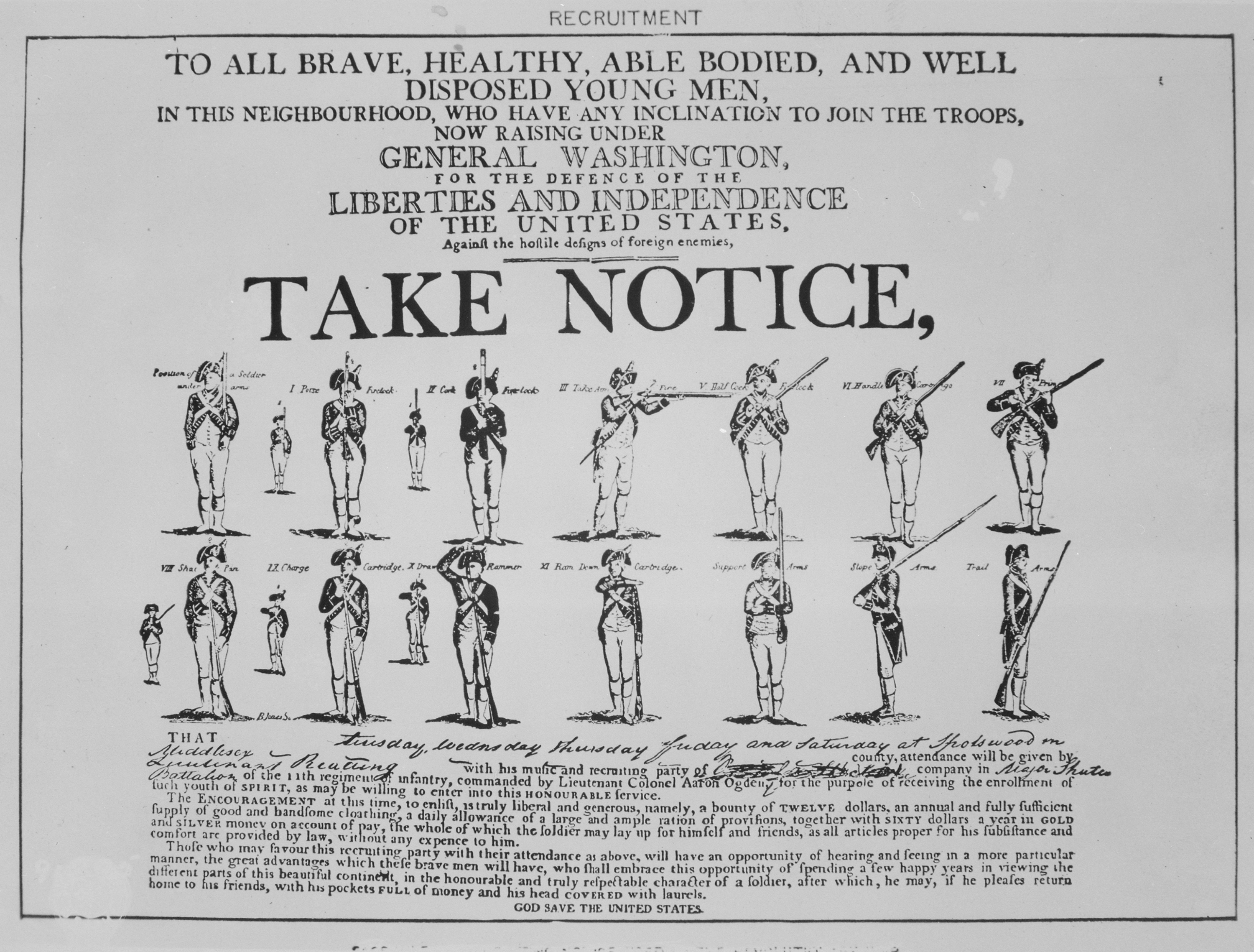
A recruiting notice for the United States Army in 1799

- October – Adams learns that his son Charles has become an alcoholic and decides to "renounce him".
- October 10 – Adams arrives in Trenton, New Jersey, where he meets with his cabinet and the Vans Murray delegation. There is disagreement as to whether the delegation should be sent.
- October 15 – Adams holds an evening meeting with his cabinet that lasts until nearly midnight to consider revising the instructions for the Vans Murray delegation. They determine that any agreement should not involve protection of French territories in the Western Hemisphere but should include a board of commissioners to resolve American claims of damage against France.
- October 16 – Adams announces the creation of the Vans Murray delegation.
- October 31 – Adams places James Winchester on the U.S. District Court for the District of Maryland through a recess appointment.

=== November 1799 ===
- November 3 – The Vans Murray delegation departs from Newport, Rhode Island.
- November 9 – Napoleon carries out a coup in France and seizes power.
- November 22 – Talleyrand is restored as the French foreign minister.
- November 27 – The Vans Murray delegation arrives at Lisbon and they stop to rest on their way to France.
- November 28 – The frigate USS Philadelphia is launched at Philadelphia.

=== December 1799 ===
- December
  - Napoleon ends France's policy of attacking American shipping.
  - Reflecting Adams's increasing strength over the Federalist Party, a Federalist caucus endorses him for president in his reelection campaign.
- December 2
  - The 6th United States Congress convenes for its first session.
  - The USS Chesapeake, the fifth of the original six frigates authorized for the United States Navy, launches at Portsmouth, Virginia.
- December 3 – Adams delivers the 1799 State of the Union Address. Unlike his previous speeches, he uses it to call for peace.
- December 4 – Adams nominates Alfred Moore to the Supreme Court of the United States to succeed James Iredell.
- December 5 – Adams nominates his recess appointee James Winchester to a permanent seat on the U.S. District Court for the District of Maryland.
- December 6 – Adams refers the amity treaty with Prussia to Congress for ratification.
- December 14 – George Washington dies.
- December 17 – The schooner USS Enterprise is sent to patrol the Caribbean for French privateers.
- December 21 – The Vans Murray delegation departs from Portugal to Paris.

== 1800 ==
=== January 1800 ===
- January 10 – The Senate ratifies the Treaty with Tunis, which had been signed in 1797.
- January 17 – Adams signs a bill criminalizing provocative communications with Native American tribes.

=== February 1800 ===
- February – News reaches the United States of Napoleon's seizure of power in France.
- February 1 – The USS Constellation wins a battle against the French ship La Vengeance.
- February 9 – France declares ten days of mourning for George Washington's death.
- February 20 – Adams signs a bill ending enlistment in the army until war between France and the United States takes place.
- February 24 – The United States extends its ban on trade with France to March 3, 1801.

=== March 1800 ===
- March – The sloop-of-war USS Trumbull launches at New London, Connecticut.
- March 2 – The Vans Murray delegation arrives in Paris.
- March 7 – The Vans Murray delegation is received by Napoleon.

=== April 1800 ===
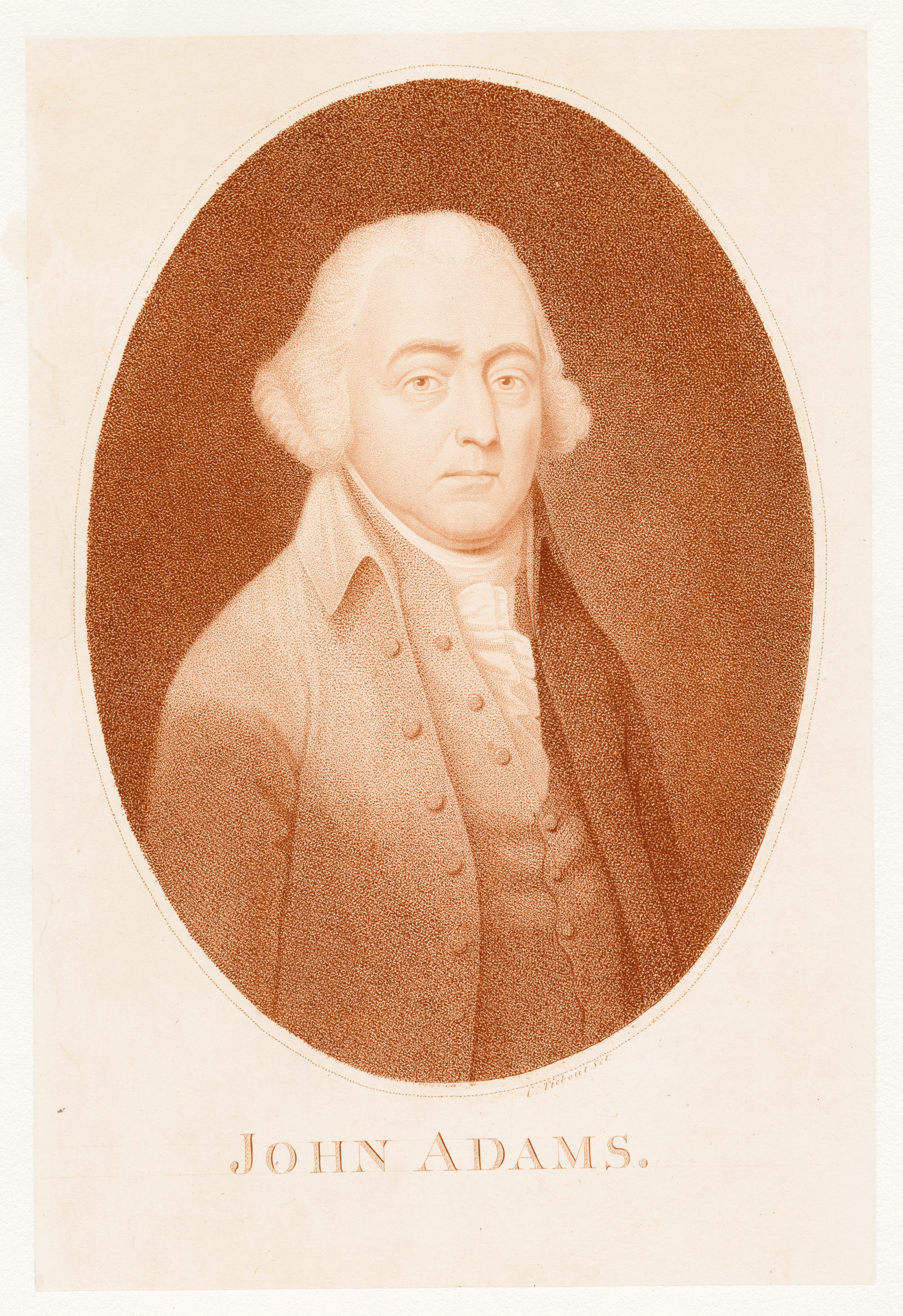
John Adams in 1800

- April 1 – The Vans Murray delegation reaches its deadline to return, but they choose to continue negotiations.
- April 4 – Adams signs the Bankruptcy Act of 1800, offering debt protection to traders. It will be repealed three years later.
- April 10 – The USS President, the sixth of the original six frigates authorized for the United States Navy, launches at New York.
- April 11 – Economist Thomas Cooper is arrested for libeling John Adams in violation of the Sedition Act.
- April 24
  - Adams signs a bill authorizing the creation of a national capital in Washington, D.C., relocating from the previous capital in Philadelphia.
  - A resolution passes to create the Library of Congress. Adams approves $5,000 (equivalent to $117,000 in 2024) in funding.
  - Cooper is sentenced to six months in prison and $500 (equivalent to $9,485 in 2025) plus court costs for libeling the president.
  - The frigate USS New York launches at New York.

=== May 1800 ===
- May 1 – The Democratic–Republicans take control of the New York State Legislature. This effectively guarantees that Adams will not receive its electoral votes in the next presidential election.
- May 3 – The Federalist Party nominates Adams as its candidate for the 1800 presidential election. Charles Cotesworth Pinckney is selected as his running mate.
- May 5 – Adams has a meeting with James McHenry, his Secretary of War, which becomes a heated argument. Adams accuses the cabinet of plotting against him and he unloads his scorn for Hamilton. He later expresses remorse for his comments.
- May 6 – McHenry declares his resignation as Secretary of War, effective June 1.
- May 7 – Adams signs a bill authorizing the creation of the Indiana Territory from part of the Northwest Territory.
- May 10
  - Adams signs the Slave Trade Act of 1800 criminalizing service on slave ships and authorizing the seizure of any ships found to be transporting slaves.
  - Adams signs the Harrison Land Act of 1800 to reform the sale of public land.
  - Adams sends a message to Timothy Pickering, his Secretary of State, suggesting that Pickering resign.
- May 11 – The Democratic-Republican Party chooses Thomas Jefferson as its candidate for the 1800 presidential election with Aaron Burr as his running mate.
- May 12 – Adams receives a reply from Pickering that he will not resign as Secretary of State. Adams dismisses Pickering from the position an hour later. This is the first instance of a president removing a cabinet member. Adams names John Marshall as his new Secretary of State and names Samuel Dexter to be McHenry's replacement as Secretary of War. He also orders that the army, which had been placed under Hamilton's charge, be dissolved. The changes effectively mark the end of Hamilton and the High Federalists having influence in the federal government.
- May 13
  - Samuel Dexter takes office as Secretary of War.
  - Attorney General Charles Lee takes office as interim Secretary of State.
  - Adams appoints William Henry Harrison as governor of the Indiana Territory.
  - Adams signs a bill authorizing the next session of Congress to be held in Washington, D.C.
- May 14
  - The restriction on military enlistment passed in February is expanded to allow for early discharge of officers and enlisted men.
  - The 6th United States Congress adjourns from its first session. The session is ended early so the federal government has time to move to the new capital.
- May 15
  - Adams orders the transfer of the federal government from Philadelphia to Washington D.C.
  - Hamilton's army begins demobilizing.
- May 21 – Adams issues pardons to the leaders of Fries's Rebellion, sparing them the death penalty. This is protested by his new cabinet, the Federalist Party, and the Pennsylvania German community.
- May 27
  - Adams leaves Philadelphia for Washington, D.C., with his steward John Briesler and nephew William Smith Shaw.
  - Journalist James T. Callender posts security after being indicted for libeling the president with his pamphlet The Prospect Before Us.
- May 30 – Connecticut transfers the Connecticut Western Reserve territory to the federal government.

=== June 1800 ===
- June 3 – Adams arrives in Washington, D.C. He takes occupancy in a room at a tavern while construction continues on what would later be called the White House.
- June 4 – Callender is sentenced to nine months in prison for libeling the president and ordered to pay $200 (equivalent to $3,794 in 2025).
- June 5 – Attorney General Charles Lee ends his tenure as interim Secretary of State.
- June 6 – John Marshall takes office as Secretary of State.
- June 11 – Celebrations are held in Washington, D.C., in honor of its new status as capital, and Adams speaks to the public.
- June 14 – Adams departs from Washington, D.C., for Quincy.

=== July 1800 ===
- July 4 – The Indiana Territory is established.

=== August 1800 ===
- August 1 – With American backing, Toussaint Louverture takes full control over Saint-Domingue.
- August 4 – The 1800 United States census begins.
- August 25 – France proposes a compromise to end hostilities with the United States.

=== September 1800 ===
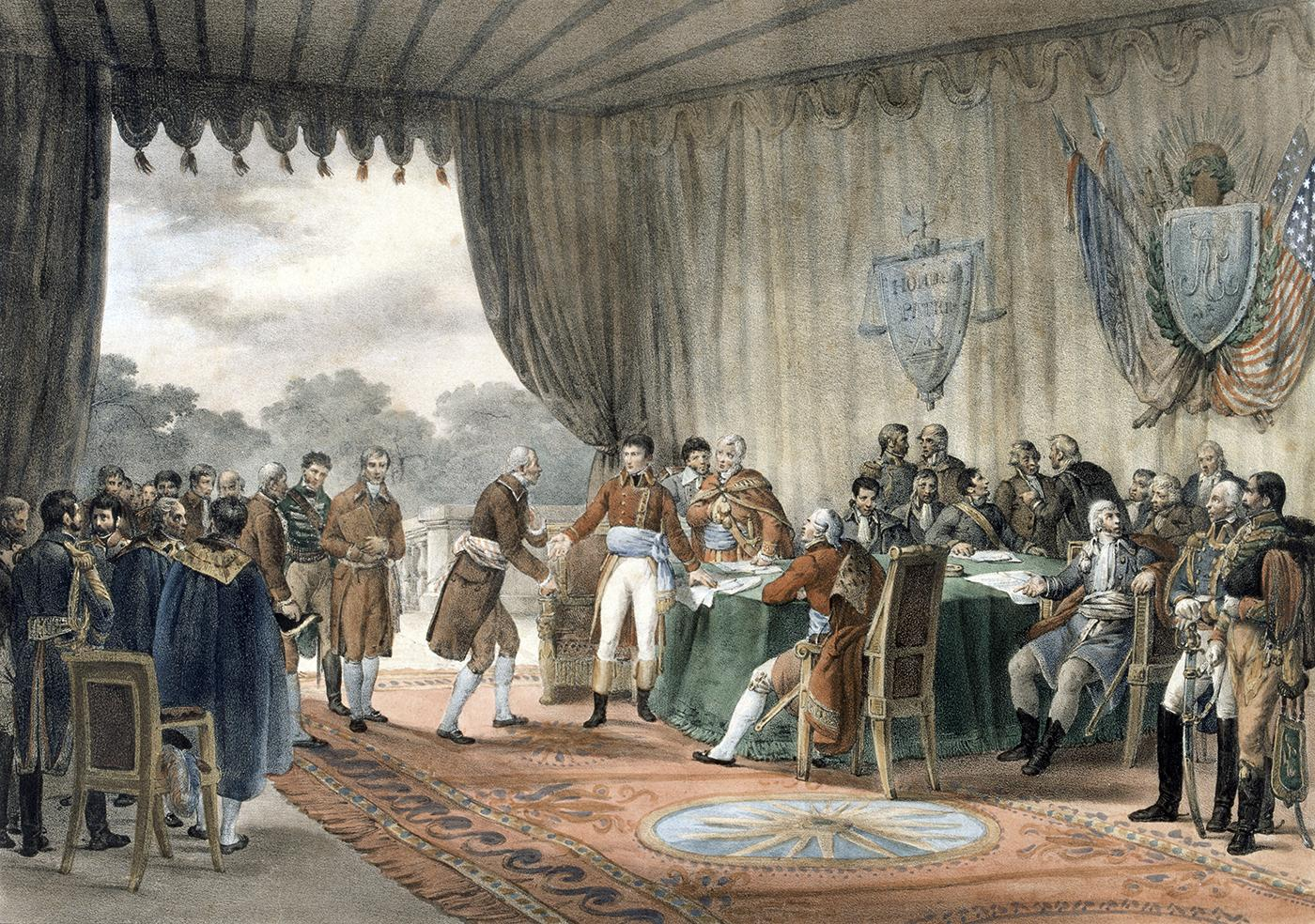
The signing of the Convention of 1800

- September 6 – Adams authorizes American trade with all of Saint-Domingue.
- September 11 – A conference is held between American and French diplomats to begin forming a peace agreement. France encourages the United States to abandon its alliance with Great Britain.
- September 22 – The USS Merrimack and USS Patapsco arrive at Curaçao to assist Great Britain and the Netherlands in defending against a French invasion of the island.
- September 27 – A peace agreement between France and the United States is drafted.
- September 30 – The Convention of 1800 creates peace between France and the United States. The Vans Murray delegation chooses to sign it even though it does not include the American demands of France renouncing the previous treaties or compensating the U.S. Although the physical signing of the document took place at two o' clock in the morning on October 1, September 30 is understood to be the official date. The signing of the treaty effectively ends the Quasi–War.

=== October 1800 ===
- October 1 – The Treaty of San Ildefonso is signed between France and Spain, granting France the territory of Louisiana that borders the United States.
- October 3 – The Convention of 1800 is signed again at a ceremony in Mortefontaine.
- October 12 – The USS Boston engages and captures the French corvette Berceau.
- October 13 – Adams departs from Quincy, Massachusetts, on the way to Washington, D.C. He makes several stops along the way.
- October 25 – The schooner USS Enterprise engages and captures the French brig Flambeau.

=== November 1800 ===
Thomas Jefferson defeated John Adams in the 1800 presidential election.

- November 1 – Adams moves into the White House, then known as the President's House.
- November 7 – News reaches the United States that a peace treaty has been signed with France.
- November 11 – The 1800 elections take place in the United States. Adams loses the presidential election to Thomas Jefferson.
- November 13 – Adams learns he has lost the presidential election after receiving unofficial results from South Carolina.
- November 16 – Abigail Adams arrives in Washington.
- November 17 – The 6th United States Congress convenes for its second session.
- November 22 – Adams delivers the 1800 State of the Union Address to Congress and expresses optimism in regard to relations with France. This is the first joint session of Congress to be held in the United States Capitol.
- November 30 – Adams's son Charles dies of dropsy and possibly cirrhosis.

=== December 1800 ===
- December 2 – Edward Thornton, 1st Count of Cacilhas, succeeds Robert Liston as the British ambassador to the United States.
- December 3
  - The Electoral College meets to confirm the next president.
  - Adams receives news that his son Charles has died.
- December 11 – William Richardson Davie returns to the United States with a copy of the Convention of 1800.
- December 15 – Adams submits the Convention of 1800 to the Senate.
- December 18 – Adams nominates John Jay as Chief Justice of the United States, but he declines.
- December 31 – Oliver Wolcott Jr. resigns as Secretary of the Treasury.

== 1801 ==
=== January 1801 ===
- January 1
  - Secretary of War Samuel Dexter begins working as Secretary of the Treasury.
  - Adams hosts the first White House New Year's Day reception.
- January 20 – Adams nominates John Marshall as Chief Justice of the United States to succeed Oliver Ellsworth.
- January 21 – Adams reports the Convention of 1800 to the Senate and encourages its ratification.
- January 23 – A vote to ratify the Convention of 1800 fails in the Senate with 16 votes in favor and 14 against, falling below the required 20-vote supermajority.
- January 27 – Marshall's nomination as Chief Justice is confirmed by the Senate.
- January 31
  - Marshall receives his commission as Chief Justice of the United States.
  - Samuel Dexter's tenure as Secretary of War ends, but he retains the title as an interim secretary. He retains his seat as Secretary of the Treasury.

=== February 1801 ===
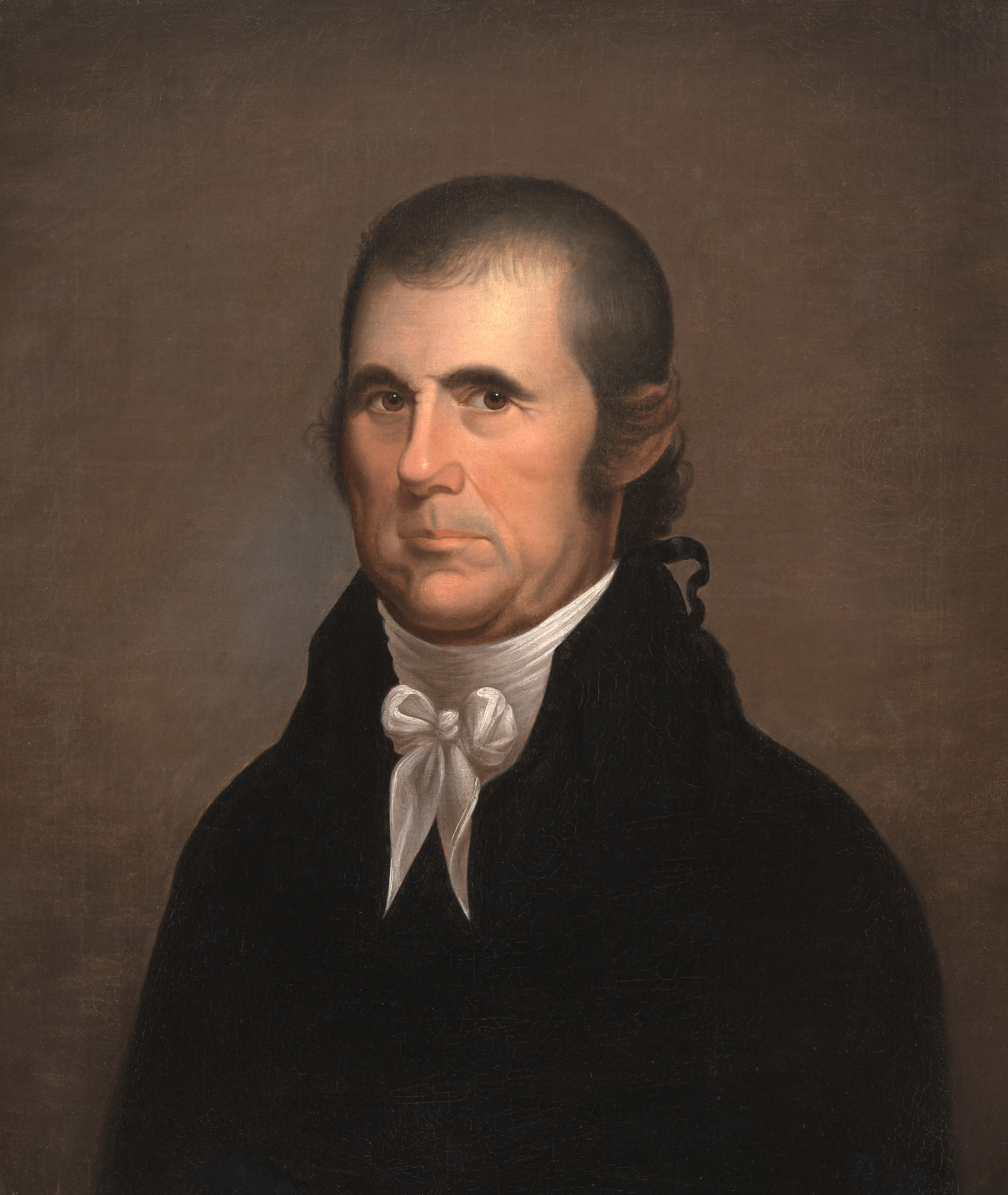
John Marshall became Chief Justice of the United States on February 4, 1801.

- February 3 – The Senate approves the Convention of 1800 with France by a vote of 22 in favor and 9 opposed.
- February 4 – John Marshall accepts his commission as Chief Justice of the United States. His tenure as Secretary of State ends but he retains the title as interim secretary.
- February 11 – Electoral votes are counted in Congress. As electoral ballots made no distinction between presidential and vice presidential votes, Jefferson ties with his vice presidential running mate Aaron Burr.
- February 13
  - Adams signs the Judiciary Act of 1801 to reshape the federal judiciary.
  - Abigail Adams and the Adams's granddaughter Susanna depart from the White House.
- February 16 – Adams holds his final presidential dinner, hosting a delegation of Indians.
- February 17 – The House of Representatives votes to confirm Jefferson as the winner of the presidential election. It takes a total of 36 ballots because Federalist members of Congress continued voting for Jefferson's running mate Burr to keep the presidency from Jefferson.
- February 18
  - Adams nominates Richard Bassett, Egbert Benson, Benjamin Bourne, William Griffith, Samuel Hitchcock, Jared Ingersoll, Philip Barton Key, Charles Lee, John Lowell, Jeremiah Smith, George Keith Taylor, and Oliver Wolcott Jr. to serve as judges on United States circuit courts. Although Greene is confirmed, he is never given his commission. Ingersoll and Lee decline theirs.
  - Adams nominates John Davis to the U.S. District Court for the District of Massachusetts and Ray Greene to the U.S. District Court for the District of Rhode Island.
- February 20 – Adams writes a note for Jefferson in anticipation of the presidential transition.
- February 21
  - Adams nominates Thomas Bee, Joseph Clay Jr., William McClung, and John Sitgreaves to serve on circuit courts. Bee, Clay, and Sitgreaves decline.
  - Adams nominates William Henry Hill to the U.S. District Court for the District of North Carolina and Jacob Read to the U.S. District Court for the District of South Carolina. Read declines and Hill does not receive a commission because the seat was not vacated as expected.
- February 24
  - Adams nominates Elijah Paine to the U.S. District Court for the District of Vermont and Thomas Gibbons to the U.S. District Court for the District of Georgia. Gibbons is not given a commission because the seat was not vacated as expected.
- February 25
  - Adams nominates Philip Barton Key as chief judge of the U.S. Circuit Court for the Fourth Circuit five days after Key was seated as a judge on the court. Adams nominates Charles Magill to take Key's place on the court.
- February 26
  - Adams nominates William Tilghman to be chief judge of the U.S. Circuit Court for the Third Circuit.
- February 27 – Adams signs the District of Columbia Organic Act of 1801 to incorporate federal land to create the District of Columbia. It also establishes judicial bodies for the district.
- February 28 – Adams nominates William Cranch and James Markham Marshall to the U.S. District Court for the District of Columbia, and Thomas Johnson to the U.S. District Court for the District of Maryland. Johnson declines.

=== March 1801 ===
- March 3
  - The Sedition Act expires.
  - The 6th United States Congress adjourns from its second session.
- March 4 – Adams's presidency ends and Jefferson is inaugurated as president.
