= Invasion of Curaçao (1800) =

Military incursion as part of the French Revolutionary Wars

- Part of the War of the Second Coalition and the Quasi-War
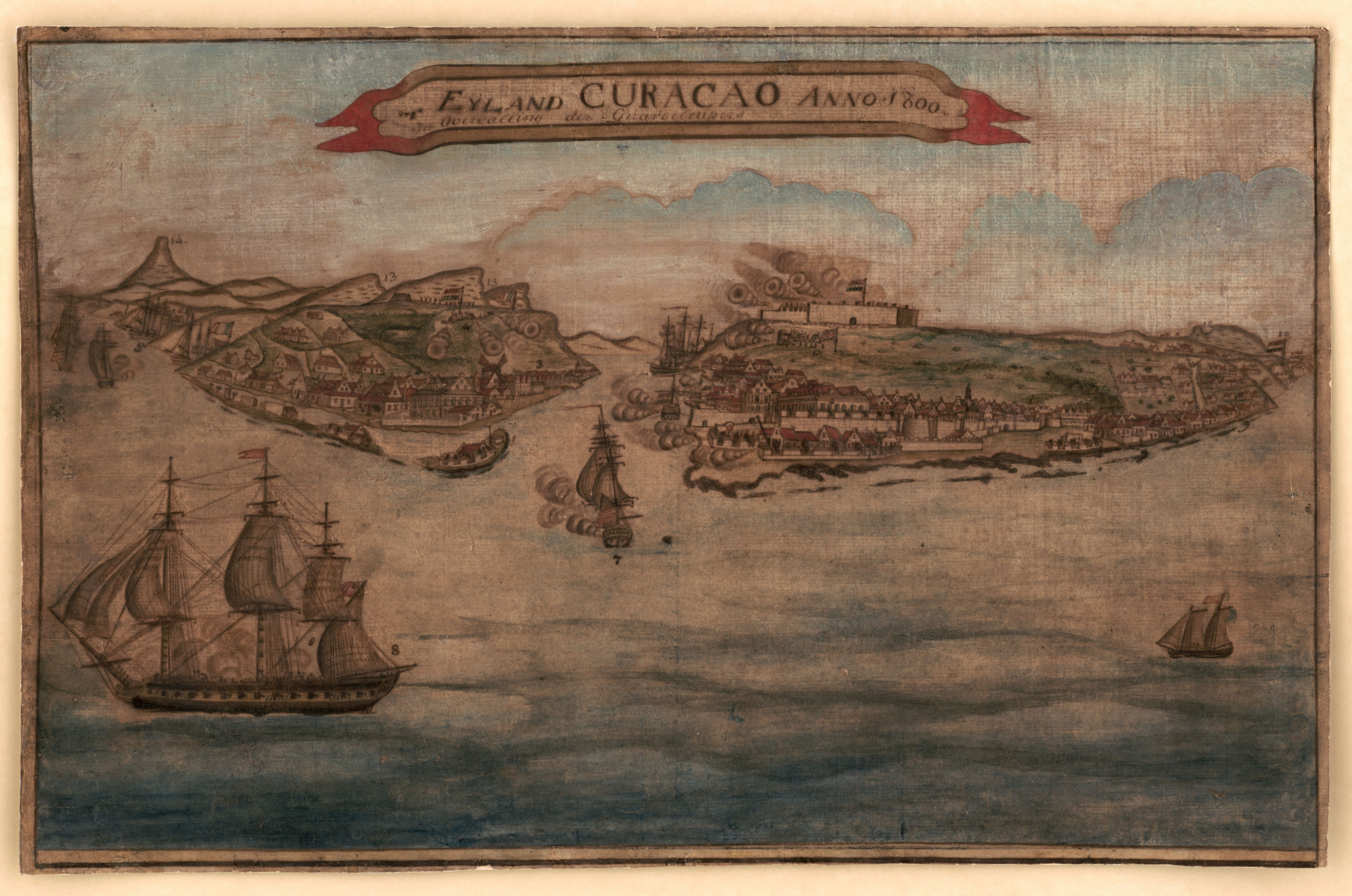
- 1800 illustration of the invasion
Date	22 July – 25 September 1800 (2 months and 3 days)
Location	Curaçao, Dutch West Indies 12.105°N 68.935°W
Result	Allied victory: British occupation of Curaçao

Belligerents
Batavian Republic; United States; Great Britain	France

Commanders and leaders
Johan Lausser (United States) Moses Brown (United States) Henry Geddes (Kingdom of Great Britain) Frederick Watkins	Louis-François Jeannet; Maurice Bresseau

Strength
1 frigate 2 ship-sloops shore defences	2 brig-sloops 3 schooners 11 additional vessels, 16 in total At least 1,400 troops, sailors and militia

Casualties and losses
American: 2 wounded	150 killed or wounded Unknown number of ships damaged

An invasion of Curaçao was launched by French forces against the Dutch colony in 1800 during the War of the Second Coalition. French forces landed on the island on 22 July, and on 5 September attacked and captured a fort protecting the town of Willemstad. The American consul there sent for help, and on 10 September the Dutch governor of the island surrendered to the British frigate HMS Nereide under the command of Frederick Watkins. On 22 September the American sloops USS Patapsco and USS Merrimack arrived, and on 23 September the Patapsco sailed into the harbor and landed troops to reinforce the garrison protecting the town.

On 23 and 24 September the French fired upon the defenders, consequently exchanging cannon and musket fire with them throughout the day and night. Though it appeared a French assault was imminent, French forces left the island during the night. Significantly, the French suffered many killed or wounded in contrast to two American wounded. The British occupied the colony, and American forces sailed away.

== Background ==
The island of Curaçao was important to American merchants in the Caribbean, and ships had been stationed near there to guard American interests since the start of the Quasi-War. The sloop USS Patapsco was ordered to sail there in May 1800, and arrived in June and left soon afterwards.

Guadeloupe's coagents Jeannet-Oudin, Baco de la Chapelle and Bresseau decided to invade Curaçao under the pretext that it wanted to surrender to the British. The expedition was commanded by Jeannet-Oudin's brother, Louis-François Jeannet, and led by Bresseau. No American warships were stationed at Curaçao on 23 July when a French force from Guadeloupe, consisting of five ships and 1,400 troops, sailors, and Guadeloupean militia, arrived.

Already at Curaçao was the French frigate, La Vengeance, which had been stranded there after being severely damaged in an action with the American frigate USS Constellation. Although the French expedition brought the supplies necessary to repair the La Vengeance, the French frigate's commander, François Pitot, refused to aide the invasion force and withdrew. The French forces landed and their commander demanded the surrender of the forts, which Governor Johan Lauffer refused.

== Siege ==
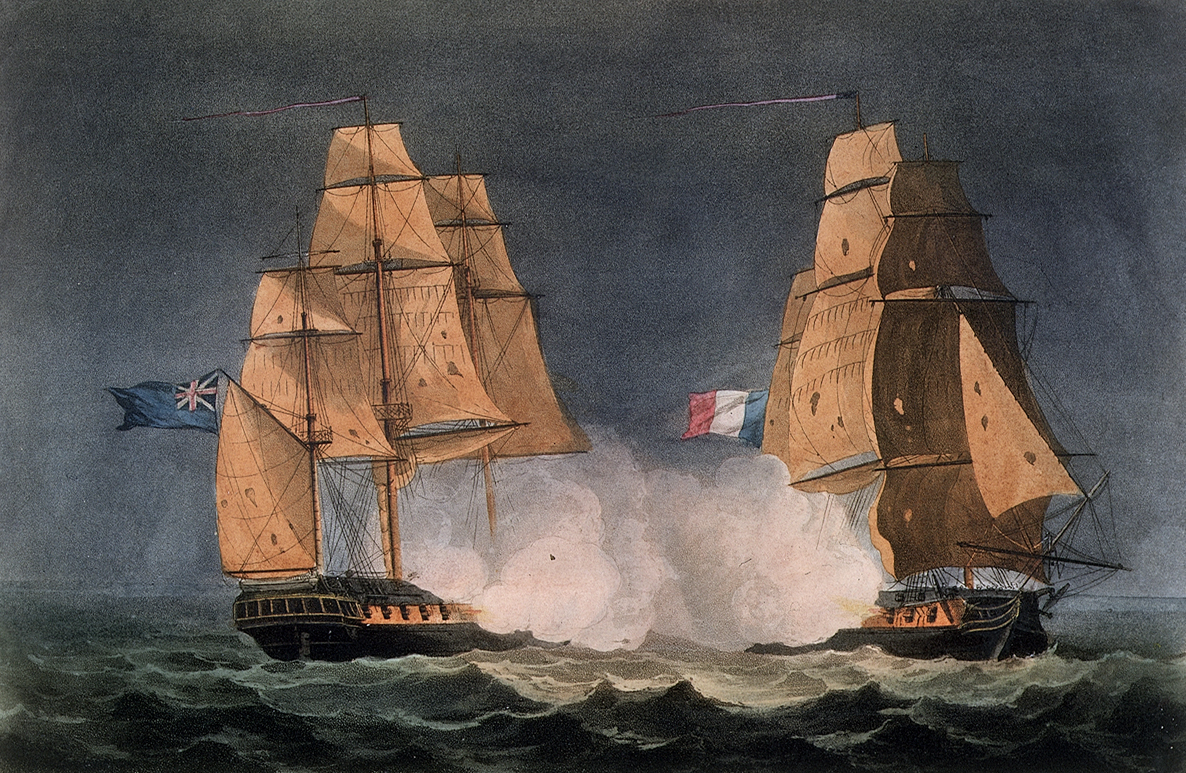
HMS Nereide (right) in French service

An additional 10 vessels with more sailors and men had landed by 5 September, when the French forces attacked the forts protecting Willemstad, capturing one and sending a note threatening to attack Americans. American consul Benjamin Phillips sent a messenger to St. Kitts, and the USS Merrimack and Patapsco were sent to Curaçao on 14 September, arriving on 22 September.

Meanwhile, the British had sent the frigate HMS Nereide under Frederick Watkins to the island to prevent its capture by the French. On 10 September Nereide arrived at the eastern point of Curaçao and there chased away two privateers that the French commander had left cruising as pickets. After these vessels retreated into a bay that contained a further 15 privateers, Watkins sailed to Willemstad where he began engaging various targets that were firing from the town. An American merchantman soon informed the British of the situation and that the Dutch were willing to capitulate to the British in exchange for protection. The British landed a force of twenty marines and accepted Governor Lassuer's surrender three days later. The French still held two forts near the town, and on 22 September, prior to the arrival of the American forces, the French commander had demanded the surrender of the town within 24 hours.

== Battle ==
On 23 September, to save the town and protect American property, Patapsco sailed into the harbor and landed her marines reinforced with twenty marines from Merrimack. The troops also manned a gun battery and fanned out through the town. At approximately 17:00 the French forts and men fired upon the defending forces, which the cannon of Patapsco answered along with the muskets and cannons of the defending forces. Two Americans were wounded; French casualties amounted to 150 men killed or wounded.

On 24 September, the French again exchanged cannon and musket fire with the defending forces; the volume of French fire led the defenders to expect an assault on the town. However, during the night the French abandoned their positions and sailed away.

== Aftermath ==
On the morning of 25 September, Merrimack discovered the French ships had sailed away during the night. Nereide sailed into the harbour and the capitulation took effect. Thinking the French would return, Watkins asked the two American captains to cruise off the windward side of the island while Nereide secured the island. In ten days of cruising, the Americans captured only one French vessel before stopping off at Willemstad while on their return to Saint Kitts.

Upon their return to Curaçao, the Americans discovered that Watkins had failed to keep his word, and instead of protecting US property had embargoed 41 ships in the harbor, seven of which were American. Watkins had also impounded a large quantity of specie owned by Phillips and set privateers cruising with orders to seize American shipping. In his reports, Watkins ignored the assistance the Americans had provided in capturing the island, failing even to mention their presence during the invasion. Watkins's treatment of the Americans was not approved by his superiors and following the appointment of Lord Hugh Seymour as the new commander of the British Jamaica Station Watkins was stripped of his command and the specie he had seized was returned.
