= USS Constellation vs La Vengeance =

1800 action between US and French frigates

- Part of the Quasi-War
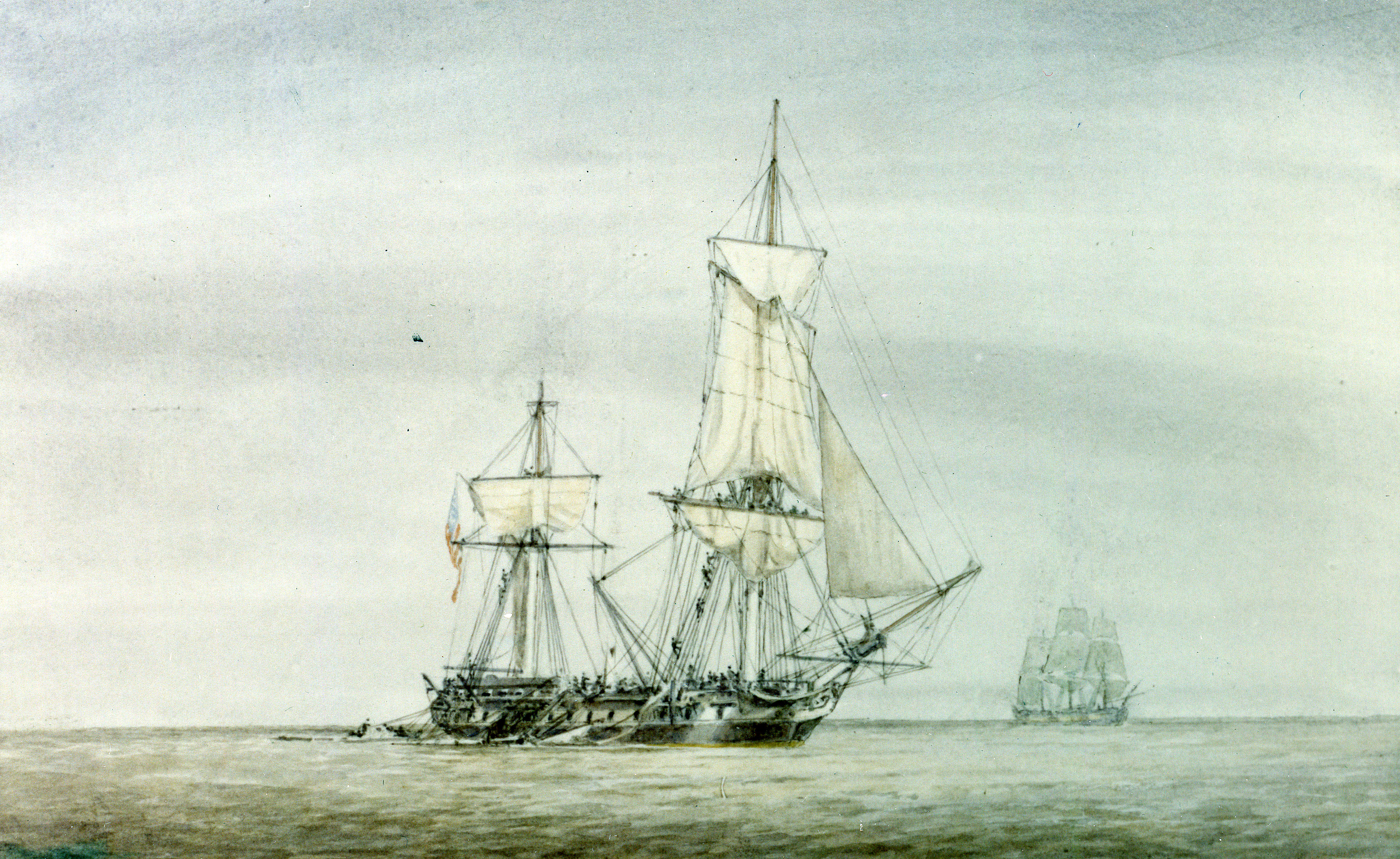
- USS Constellation engaging the French frigate La Vengeance
Date	1–2 February 1800
Location	Off Saint Kitts
Result	Inconclusive

Belligerents
United States	(French First Republic) France

Commanders and leaders
Thomas Truxton	(France) François Marie Pitot

Strength
1 frigate 336 crew 38 guns	1 frigate 380 crew 40 guns

Casualties and losses
14 dead 25 wounded 1 frigate severely damaged	28–160 dead 110 wounded 1 frigate severely damaged

USS Constellation vs La Vengeance, or the action of 1 February 1800, was a single-ship action fought between frigates of the French Navy and the United States Navy during the Quasi-War. In the battle the American frigate USS Constellation tried to take the French frigate La Vengeance as a prize. Both ships were heavily damaged. Although the French frigate struck her colors (surrendered) twice, she managed to flee only after the main mast of her opponent had fallen.

In 1798, an undeclared war had begun between the United States and France due to French seizures of American merchantmen. As part of an American effort to deter French attacks, Commodore Thomas Truxton led an American naval squadron that was dispatched to the Lesser Antilles. Learning that regular French naval forces were in the region, Truxton set out in his flagship Constellation and sailed to Guadeloupe to engage them. On 1 February 1800, while nearing the French colony, Constellation met François Marie Pitot's frigate La Vengeance of the French Navy. Despite Pitot's attempts to flee, his frigate was drawn into a heavy engagement with Constellation. Although the French frigate struck her colors twice, Constellation was unable to take La Vengeance as a prize. Eventually Pitot was able to escape with his frigate to Curaçao, though only after sustaining severe casualties and damage to his vessel. Truxton's ship sustained serious damage and sailed to Jamaica for repairs before returning home to a hero's welcome.

== Background ==
In 1800, the Quasi-War between the United States and France was in full force. In order to prevent French attacks against American merchantmen in the Caribbean, the United States Navy maintained four squadrons of vessels in the region. One such squadron was commanded by Commodore Thomas Truxton, and tasked with patrolling the Lesser Antilles. Taking command on 19 January 1800 after arriving at Saint Kitts in his flagship USS Constellation, Truxton's squadron consisted of four frigates, three schooners, and a ship-rigged man of war. Besides the numerous privateers operating in the area, the only regular French naval forces in Truxton's area of operations were the frigate La Vengeance under François Marie Pitot and the corvette La Berceau under Louis Senes. Both vessels had arrived at Guadeloupe on 10 December 1799 escorting the new administrators of the French colony. Once at Saint Kitts, Truxton dispersed his squadron, giving each ship orders to cruise independently. He then set sail for Guadeloupe on 30 January 1800 with his flagship Constellation, intending to challenge the French frigate and corvette there. The same day, Pitot in La Vengeance left Guadaloupe's capital of Basse-Terre for France.

By this point in the Quasi-War, the 1,265-ton Constellation carried 38 cannon despite officially being classified by the United States Navy as a 36-gun frigate. Previously her armament had consisted of 24-pounder guns, but these had proven inefficient during Truxton's action with L'Insurgente and as a result were removed and replaced with twenty-eight 18-pounder cannon and ten 24-pounder carronades. Truxton and his crew were hardened veterans and were well prepared for a fight. Their French counterparts were not as ready for an engagement. Pitot's frigate was carrying a large quantity of specie as well as 36 American prisoners of war and 80 passengers, two of whom were generals. Under such circumstances Pitot intended to avoid an engagement if possible, even though La Vengeance was a more heavily armed vessel carrying eight 42-pounder carronades, twenty-eight 18-pounders, and sixteen 12-pounder cannon. The French also had a distinct advantage in the event of a boarding action, as Constellation had only 310 men to La Vengeance's complement of 380 crew.

== Engagement ==
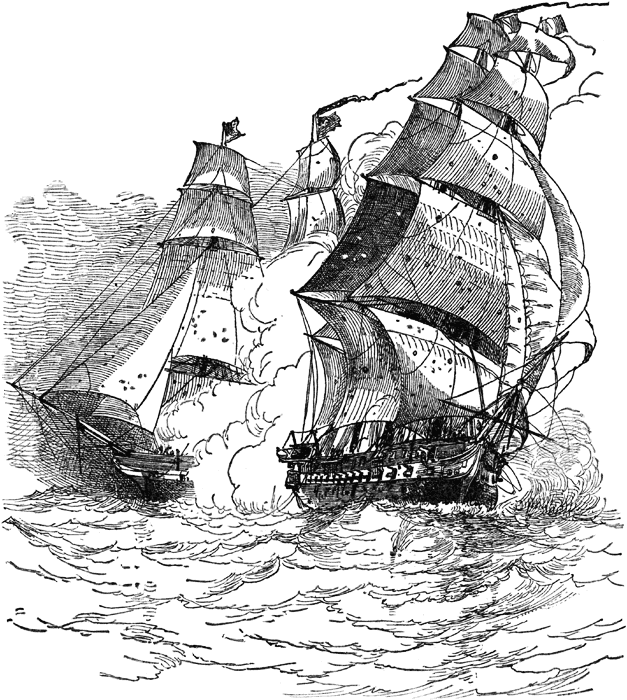
Constellation and La Vengeance engaged in combat.

On 1 February 1800 at 07:00, Truxton's crew spotted what appeared to be a 54-gun frigate flying British colors two leagues off the Basse-Terre roadstead. In an effort to communicate with the mysterious frigate, Constellation flew British colors. Pitot had sighted the American ship by 07:45. Thinking the vessel chasing him was a superior 55-gun warship, he sought to avoid conflict, and continued to sail with the wind rather than head north as he had originally intended. In an effort to increase her speed, the French frigate's crew put out studding sails to catch more wind. The behavior of Pitot's frigate signaled to Truxton that she was really a French warship, so he ordered Constellation cleared for action and gave chase. By 08:00 he struck the British colors and raised the American flag. As he closed with La Vengeance he shouted through a speaking trumpet for the French vessel to surrender.

At this point the action began, with Pitot's stern chasers opening fire upon Constellation. In an effort to cut the American frigate's advantage in speed, La Vengeance changed course to the south-east where the wind would give her an advantage. As he maneuvered his vessel, Pitot was able to unleash a broadside aimed at Constellation's rigging. The American frigate waited to return fire until she'd gained the weather gage. Now having the advantage of the wind, Truxton's opening double-shotted broadside slammed into the port side of La Vengeance's hull. Sailing side by side, the two frigates continued to engage each other for two and a half hours while Truxton attempted unsuccessfully to move his ship into a raking fire position. As the French tended to aim for the rigging, at one point Constellation's foresails were shot away and the frigate lost her maneuverability until they could be replaced.

La Vengeance prepared for a boarding action when the two frigates drew closer together at 22:45, but this attempt was foiled when Constellation fired broadsides of grapeshot at Pitot's ship while American marines fired their muskets and hurled grenades down from the rigging. With the French ship drawing off, the two vessels began a longer range round shot duel that lasted until 02:00 on 2 February 1800, when La Vengeance struck her colors for the second time. At some point earlier in the action, Pitot had struck his flag but the Americans did not notice because of darkness. Truxton moved Constellation to within 25 yards (23 m) of his vanquished opponent aiming to take her as a prize. The American commodore's ambitions were spoiled when at 03:00 Constellation's mainmast fell overboard, killing several topmen who went down with it. With the Americans unable to come alongside his vessel, Pitot took advantage of the situation and simply slipped away into the darkness.

== Aftermath ==
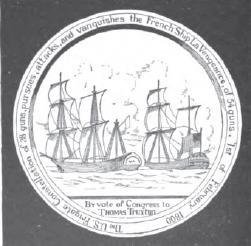
The reverse of Truxton's Congressional Gold Medal

Casualties were heavy on both sides, and both vessels were in such poor condition that each commander thought he had sunk his opponent. Most of La Vengeance's rigging had been blown away; only the lower foremast, lower mizzenmast, and bowsprit were operational. Pitot set course for Curaçao and was forced to ground his vessel there to prevent her from sinking. The number of French casualties is somewhat unclear: official French accounts report 28 dead and 40 wounded, while accounts from Curaçao state that the French frigate had lost 160 men. Once Pitot reached Curaçao he was beset with further problems. La Vengeance remained out of action for months due to difficulties in acquiring support needed to repair the frigate from the Dutch officials there. A French expedition to seize Curaçao brought the materiel needed to repair the frigate, but when asked to help attack the island Pitot refused and slipped away to Guadaloupe.

Constellation had also suffered heavy damage with 15 of her crew slain and a further 25 wounded, of whom 11 later died. The ship sailed to Port Royal, Jamaica, for a refit, but Truxton could not complete the necessary repairs because of a shortage of naval stores. The ship left Jamaica a week after she arrived, with only her mainmast replaced. After escorting a convoy of 14 merchantmen back to the United States, Truxton sailed his battered frigate to Hampton Roads for a proper refit. Only after he returned to the United States did the American commodore finally learn that the La Vengeance had not been sunk. Truxton was considered a hero and received considerable praise for his actions. In response to his battle with Pitot's frigate, the American government commended Truxton with a Congressional Gold Medal depicting the battle. James C. Jarvis, a 13-year-old Midshipman who was killed when the mainmast collapsed, became famous for his bravery during the battle.

== Sources ==
- Allen, Gardner Weld (1909). Our naval war with France. Boston and New York: Houghton Mifflin Company. ISBN 1-112-12707-0. OCLC 1202325.
- Cooper, James Fenimore (1839). History of the Navy of the United States of America. Philadelphia: Lea & Blanchard. OCLC 4765607.
- Hill, Frederic Stanhope (1903). Twenty-six Historic Ships. New York and London: G.P. Putnam's Sons. OCLC 2622223.
- Palmer, Michael A. (1987). Stoddert's War. Annapolis: Naval Institute Press. ISBN 1-55750-664-7. OCLC 15162322.
- Shaffner, Taliaferro Preston (1864). History of the United States of America. London: The London Printing and Publishing Company. OCLC 634744808.
- Toll, Ian W. (2006). Six Frigates: The Epic History of the Founding of the US Navy. New York: W. W. Norton. ISBN 0-393-05847-6. OCLC 633333009.
- Troude, Onésime-Joachim (1867). Batailles navales de la France (in French). Vol. 3. Challamel ainé. pp. 200–201.
