= USS George Washington (1798) =

Sloops-of-war of the United States Navy

History

United States
- Cost: $69,024
- Launched: 1793
- Acquired: 12 October 1798
- Fate: Sold, May 1802

General characteristics
- Displacement: 624 or 654
- Length: 108 ft (33 m) keel
- Beam: 32 ft 6 in (9.91 m)
- Draught: 14 ft (4.3 m)
- Complement: 220 officers and enlisted. Reduced to <100 for 2nd Algiers cruise.
- Armament: 24x9-pdrs, 8x6-pdrs. Reduced to 15x9-pounders for 2nd Algiers cruise.

The first USS George Washington was a frigate in the United States Navy. She was named after United States Founding Father and President George Washington.

George Washington was built as a merchant vessel at Providence, R.I., in 1793; purchased by the Congress at Providence 12 October 1798 from John Brown and John Francis for $10,400 in cash and $30,000 in 6 percent navy stock, for use in the developing undeclared naval war (the so-called Quasi-War) with France, and converted to a warship under the supervision of Captain Silas Talbot with Captain Patrick Fletcher in command.

== Service ==
George Washington proceeded in early December to Dominica, in the West Indies, to join Commodore John Barry's squadron for the protection of American commercial against the many French privateer's preying on US shipping and commerce. She rendezvoused with Barry in the USS United States and the USS Constitution at sea 29 December and arrived Dominica next day. For the next few months, she convoyed Americas in the West Indies, sailing from St. Christopher's Island to Tobago. During this time, with revenue cutter Pickering, she recaptured two American ships from the French: the brig Fair American 29 April 1799, and the schooner Francis on 1 May 1799. Francis was Captained by Joshua Preble, Lieutenant Edward Preble's brother (Capt. of USRC Pickering).

She departed the Caribbean in mid-1799, arriving Newport, Rhode Island, 12 June 1799, and after a short stay sailed again 2 July. Secretary of the Navy Benjamin Stoddert considered her a dull sailer so she wasn't sent back to the Caribbean immediately, instead on this cruise, she searched the coast for French privateers as far south as Charleston, S.C., and then took station off Santo Domingo protecting American commerce. The George Washington returned to the United States, in October 1799, for extensive repairs. On 19 October 1799, she arrived at and was ordered to sail from Marcus Hook to Newport, Rhode Island where her current crew was to be discharged. Extensive repairs were done to her bottom & her bottom was recoppered.

She was taken to Philadelphia in April 1800 and there was outfitted and prepared for sea. In May 1800, Captain William Bainbridge was given command of the George Washington. She sailed from Newport on 13 June. Lacking a strong navy, the United States accepted the questionable alternative of trying to protect its commerce from the Barbary pirates by paying an annual tribute (extortion). Bainbridge sailed with a load of stores and timber for the Dey of Algiers on 8 August. The George Washington arrived safely 17 September, the first American warship to enter the Mediterranean. However, the ship did not contain enough tribute to satisfy the Dey's demands. The Dey demanded the use of the ship and its crew, claiming he owned them since they pay tribute. Unhappily, Bainbridge had to accede to threats and carry the Dey's presents to the Sultan at Constantinople. He protested vigorously but, in the face of concentrated guns ashore and credible threats of retaliation against American shipping, plus threats of seizure, enslavement, and a state of war between the U.S. and Algiers if demands weren't met, he departed 19 October. She arrived at Constantinople on 11 November, 1800. She departed Constantinople on 30 December. She returned to Algiers on 21 January 1801, departing 31 January, and after a visit to Alicant arrived back in the United States on 19 April 1801. In a letter dated 20 February to Josiah Parker, chairman of the Committee on Naval Affairs, Navy Secretary Stoddert recommended selling her. On 4 May 1801, Captain William Bainbridge was relieved of command, and was succeeded by Lt. John Shaw as her Captain.

The ship underwent repairs and was again fitted to carry stores and timber to Algiers. Manned with only a partial crew and reduced armament, she sailed 20 July 1801, escorting the merchantman Peace & Plenty, both loaded with goods from the U. S. government for the Bey of Tunis, and arrived in Algiers via Málaga, Spain, on 5 October 1801. After calling at Italian and French ports, she returned to Philadelphia about 15 April 1802. George Washington was sold in May 1802 by the Navy agent in Philadelphia, George Harrison.

== See also ==
- List of sloops of war of the United States Navy
- Bibliography of early American naval history

== Bibliography ==
- Allen, Gardner Weld (1905). Our Navy and the Barbary Corsairs.
  Houghton Mifflin & Co., Boston, New York and Chicago. p. 354. OCLC 2618279. E'Book
- Harris, Gardner W. (1837). The Life and Services of Commodore William Bainbridge, United States navy.
  Carey Lea & Blanchard, Philadelphia. p. 254. ISBN 0945726589. E'Book E'Book2
- Ignatius, Martin; Griffin, Joseph (1903). Commodore John Barry: "the father of the American navy".
  Published by the Author, Philadelphia. p. 424. E'Book
- Dept U.S.Navy. "USS George Washington".
  Dictionary of American Naval Fighting Ships.
  DEPARTMENT OF THE NAVY – NAVAL HISTORICAL CENTER. Archived from the original on 19 August 2000.
