= USS Pickering =

American schooner

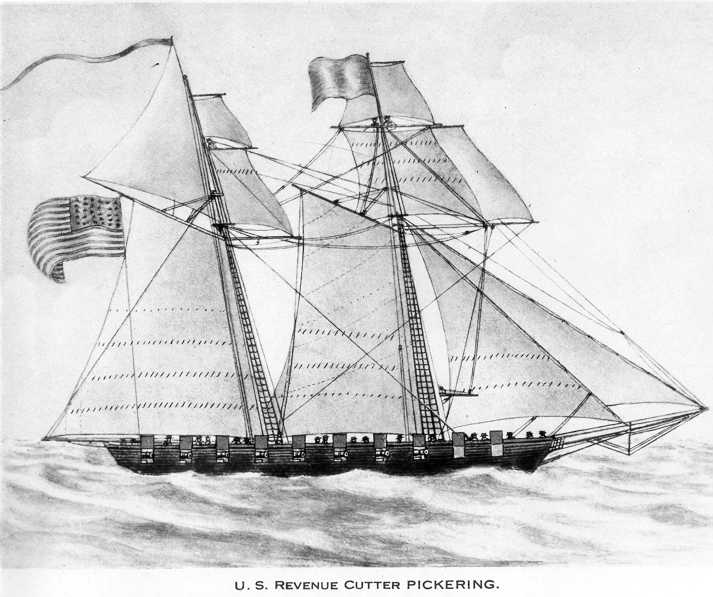
- USRC Pickering, later renamed USS Pickering

History

United States
- Name: USS Pickering
- Cost: $32,126
- Laid down: 1798
- Commissioned: 22 August 1798
- Fate: Lost 1800

General characteristics
- Type: Topsail schooner
- Displacement: 187 long tons (190 t)
- Length: 77 ft (23 m)
- Beam: 20 ft (6.1 m)
- Draft: 9 ft (2.7 m)
- Propulsion: Sails
- Complement: 70 officers and enlisted or 90.
- Armament: 14 × 4-pounder guns

USS Pickering was the first brig built for the United States Revenue Cutter Service which later served with the United States Navy during the Quasi-War with France. She was named for Timothy Pickering, then the Secretary of State.

USRC Pickering was built at Newburyport, Massachusetts in 1798 for the Revenue Cutter Service. Captain Jonathan Chapman was her first commander. Taken into the Navy in July at the outbreak of the Quasi-War, she departed Boston on her first cruise on 22 August.

== Service history ==
In 1799 and early 1800, she was part of Commodore Barry's squadron in the West Indies. Lieutenant Edward Preble commanded Pickering from January through June 1799, when he was promoted to captain and took command of the frigate Essex.

On 21 April 1799 she exchanged fire with Fort Dup Vieux and Fort Royall, Guadeloupe. On 29 April 1799 she and USS George Washington recaptured American brig "Fair American" captured by 3 French letters of marque the previous day. On 1 May 1799 she, and USS George Washington recaptured American brig "Francis", captured by a French privateer. "Francis" was Captained by Joshua Preble, Lieutenant Edward Preble's brother. Pickering was permanently transferred to the Navy on 20 May and re-designated USS Pickering. She arrived at New York 12–13 June 1799 from her deployment to the Caribbean. Master Commandant Benjamin Hillar, U.S. Navy, assumed command in June, and continued command of the ship for its final years. She, USS Ganges, and USS Merrimack recaptured American merchant schooner "John" on 15 August 1799. On 16 September 1799 she captured (recaptured?) schooner Atalanta, condemned by prize court and sold in August, 1800. Pickering fought a notable engagement with the French privateer L'Egypte Conquise on 18 October 1799. The Frenchman was well fitted out and manned and should have been able to capture Pickering. While the French ship carried fourteen 9-pounders, four 6-pounders, and crew of 250, the American cutter had only fourteen 4-pounders and seventy men. After a nine-hour battle, however, the French ship was forced to surrender. A few days earlier she had a running battle with a French lugger that escaped due to springing of the Pickering's masts. Sometime in October she and USS Delaware recaptured brig "Henrich". On 27 December 1799 she captured a French privateer, possibly "Voltiguese". Pickering continued to cruise in the West Indies, and before her return to the United States had captured four French privateers, including Atalanta, L'Active(sometime before 24 April), and Fly,. Between 2 August to 31 December 1799 she recaptured schooner "Cynthia", Unknown English sloop, French schooner "Helen", recaptured Danish brig "Helen", recaptured brig "Brothers" sometime in November, recaptured schooner "Harriet" in January, 1800. On 2 February 1800 she recaptured armed merchant ship "Portland" in the Sale Rock Passage, she had been captured by a privateer on 25 January (21°50′N 59°30′W). In April she recaptured brigs "Mary" and "Eliza", and captured an unknown schooner. She arrived in Boston on 17 May 1800. She departed Boston 10 June to patrol between Bermuda and Cape Hatteras.

She returned to New Castle, Delaware on 21 July. Ordered to join Commodore Thomas Truxton's squadron on the Guadeloupe Station in the West Indies, she sailed from New Castle, Delaware on 20 August, and was never heard from again. She is presumed to have been lost with all hands in a gale later in August. This storm is also thought to have sunk USS Insurgent, which likewise vanished without a trace.

== Bibliography ==
- Grocott, Terence (1997). Shipwrecks of the Revolutionary and Napoleonic eras. Chatham. ISBN 1-86176-030-2.
