= USS Ganges =

Sloops-of-war of the United States Navy

History

U.S.
- Name: USS Ganges
- Laid down: 1794
- Acquired: By purchase 3 May 1798
- Decommissioned: 1801
- Out of service: Sold 1801
- Fate: Sold, 1801

General characteristics
- Displacement: 504 long tons (512 t)
- Length: 116 ft 4 in (35.5 m)
- Beam: 31 ft 4 in (9.6 m)
- Draft: 15 ft 8 in (4.8 m)
- Propulsion: Sail (3 masts)
- Complement: 220 officers and enlisted
- Armament: 24 × 9-pounder guns; 2 × 6-pounder guns

USS Ganges was a man-of-war in the United States Navy during the Quasi-War with France.

She was originally a fast sailing merchantman, built in Philadelphia in 1794 for the East Indies trade and named for the Ganges, India's principal river, which flows into the Bay of Bengal. Ganges regularly sailed to Calcutta and Canton. Apparently, she returned to civilian service after serving in the U.S. Navy between 1798 and 1801.

== Service history ==
She retained her merchant name when the U.S. Navy purchased her from the firm of Willing and Francis of Philadelphia on 3 May 1798. She cost $58,000 or $80,665, depending on the source. With hostilities with France imminent, the Navy hastily fitted her out, making her the first man-of-war to fit out and get to sea under the second organization of the Navy. In Navy service, she is described as being of 504 tons and carrying 24 guns and a crew of 220 men. Her first captain was Captain Richard Dale, who had returned in her from a voyage to China.

=== 1798 ===
Ganges sailed from Philadelphia on 24 May 1798 under Richard Dale, whose orders directed him to "seize, take and bring into a port of the United States" French armed ships "committing depredations" within one marine league of the coast between the Capes of Virginia and Long Island. On 13 July, further orders authorized her to take any French armed ship wherever found, but she continued patrol between Cape Henry and Long Island for the protection of the large seaport cities. On 30 July, Ganges was directed to return to Philadelphia for refitting, but put into New York City instead because of fever and plague at Philadelphia.

In mid-September 1798, Captain Thomas Tingey relieved Captain Dale and, on 7 December, his ship was ordered to the Windward Passage between Cuba and Hispaniola to join the squadron protecting the Jamaican trade. Cruising in these waters with General Pinkney and South Carolina, she guarded American merchantmen from seizure by French naval vessels, privateers, and "all armed vessels acting without commission."

=== 1799 ===
On 6 January 1799, off the Island of Tortuga, Ganges fell in with the sloop Ceres, off her course for no apparent reason and suspected of heading for illegal trade at Cap Français. Tingey detained the captain of Ceres, questioned him, and reported to intelligence. The incident occasioned the following passage from Tingey's letter of concern to Benjamin Stoddert, the Secretary of the Navy:

There is one kind of business carried on here at present, which I conceive behoves us much to suppress. Many American vessels are said to have arrived here, with provisions, etc., in a day or two their papers are chang'd by a pretended sale, and they go off for French ports—in some instances, without shifting or discharging their cargoes—return here with French produce, assume their American papers, and clear from this for home. I shall endeavor to ascertain and identify some of the actors in this nefarious business and give you information.

On 21 February, officers of the 28-gun English frigate Surprise boarded Ganges off Cape Nichola Mole, Hispaniola, and demanded all Englishmen aboard. Tingey firmly replied:

A public ship carries no protection but her flag. I do not expect to succeed in a contest with you; but I will die at my quarters before a man shall be taken from the ship.

The crew gave three cheers, ran to quarters, and called for "Yankee Doodle". Surprise departed.

Having returned home for repairs in March, Ganges convoyed Kingston, carrying American Consul General Dr. Edward Stevens, to talk with Toussaint Louverture in Haiti. She then cruised the Caribbean from Havana to Puerto Rico, St. Thomas, St. Kitts, St. Bartholomew's, Santo Domingo, Barbuda, and Jamaica.

On 21 April off Cape Isabella, she seized the American sloop Mary, of Norwich, for illegal trading. That same day, she recaptured the American ship Eliza of Charleston. The French privateer Telemaque, Captain Arnault, had captured her and she was sailing under a prize crew. Ganges sent the two vessels together to Philadelphia.

On 16 June, Ganges, with Norfolk, captured the 8-gun French privateer sloop Vainquere (formerly British Harlequin) 16-18 Leagues north north east of Saint Bartholomews after a 90-mile chase lasting more than eight hours and requiring the expenditure of some 40 cannon shot. The privateer's crew numbered some 85 men. The prize sailed to St. Christopher's, then Norfolk under Captain Pitcher.

The hurricane season approached and it was thought Ganges should return to the United States, but Tingey proudly reported his ship could withstand the Caribbean storms:

No ship in the service ... will be found better able to sustain this violence than the Ganges—nor a crew that can, with more alacrity, bring a ship to a state of preparation to bear heavy weather. ... Believe me Sir, that she has outsailed every ship and vessel of the United States.

On 2 July, she put a prize crew on American brig "Young George" because of questionable provenance of ownership of the vessel and the cargo, and was sent into St. Bartolomew. The prize arrived at Newcastle in mid-September. The prize arrived at Newcastle in mid-September.

On 5 August, Ganges captured the 6-gun Letter of Marque schooner La Rabateuse after a 12-hour chase in which the privateer threw overboard all her guns and endured 13 cannon shot before surrendering. She, USS Pickering, and USS Merrimack recaptured American merchant schooner John on 15 or 16 August 1799, the privateer escaped. Three days later, a small French "letter of marque" being chased by an English privateer surrendered to "Ganges" off St. Thomas. In a letter dated 29 August it's stated that she captured a small French pilot boat earlier that mounted no guns, Capt. Tingey said he ransomed the boat back to her owner. She later captured L'Eugene with 28 men and on 2 October recaptured the American schooner Laurel, which the French had renamed L'Esperance. She, with USS Eagle, captured a French Letter of Marque, probably early November.

Ganges returned to Philadelphia in the fall and Captain John Mullowny relieved Captain Tingey on 16 November at Philadelphia, Pa. She dropped down to Glocester Point on 8 December., she sailed out into Delaware Bay on 20 December for the West Indies, again convoying American merchantmen until May 1800, when she returned to the States.

=== 1800 ===
She arrived at Newcastle, Delaware on 3 May, and was ordered to Philadelphia. On 25 May 1800, Captain Mullowny received orders to proceed to Havana, and Ganges shortly departed Philadelphia for another eventful cruise. She cleared the Capes of the Delaware on 3 June escorting a convoy. On 19 July, she captured the schooner Prudent off the coast of Cuba. On 20 July, she recaptured American brigantine Dispatch, captured 11 days earlier by a French barge; and the 21st, the third successful day in a row, took schooner Phoebe (120 slaves) off Matanzas. On 28 July, Ganges captured French privateer La Fortune et Louis. On 24 August, she departed from Havana. In September, her crew ridden with fever, she returned to the United States and was at Newcastle by 20 September. On 17 December, she departed (probably Philadelphia) downstream, anchoring off Reedy Island the next day. By 22 December, she was 3 leagues East southeast of Little Egg Harbor, New Jersey. On 24 December she was anchored off Sandy Hook.

The Phoebe and the Prudent were two illegal U.S. slave schooners. Ganges brought them to Fort Mifflin in Philadelphia as prizes. Mullowny chose Philadelphia because of the city's strong anti-slavery sentiments. The 135 Africans on board were detained at the Lazaretto for 31 days while their legal status was established. During their stay, the staff of the Lazaretto nursed the emaciated and diseased slaves back to health. The Pennsylvania Abolition Society took guardianship of the Africans, gave them the last name "Ganges" and dispersed them locally via indentures. Apparently most eventually became part of Pennsylvania's population of free blacks.

=== 1801 ===
Sailing again 31 January 1801, Ganges proceeded with a convoy for Havana. En route she was severely damaged by a storm and put into Basseterre, St. Christopher. Here, Commodore John Barry surveyed the ship on 2 March and found her "unfit for sea." In a letter dated 20 February to Josiah Parker, chairman of the Committee on Naval Affairs, Navy Secretary Stoddert recommended selling her, (not related to the storm damage). Being unable to continue her voyage, Ganges remained on the Guadeloupe station until May, then proceeded north with a convoy that reached Philadelphia early in June, probably 8 June. On 10 June 1801, under provision of the Peace Establishment Act, the Navy agent at Philadelphia prepared Ganges for sale. She was sold prior to 8 December for $21,000. The Navy was reduced to thirteen vessels and the Ganges again became a merchant ship.

== People associated with Ganges ==
One of the passengers aboard the Ganges when it arrived at Philadelphia on 31 March 1806 had an Indian surname, Singh.

Officers and midshipmen of Ganges included several future heroes such as Thomas Macdonough, James Lawrence, Jacob Jones, and Daniel Carmick. Also on board, heading the detachment of Marines, was Lt. Anthony Gale, who would later become Commandant of the U S Marine Corps.
