= USS Merrimack (1798) =

American Navy ship

History

United States
- Name: USS Merrimack
- Builder: Association of Newburyport Shipwrights, Newburyport, Massachusetts
- Launched: 12 October 1798
- Commissioned: December 1798
- Decommissioned: April 1801
- Fate: Sold 1801
- Notes: Subsequently lost as merchant ship Monticello

General characteristics
- Tonnage: 460 or 530
- Propulsion: Sails
- Complement: 220 officers and enlisted
- Armament: 20 × 9-pounder guns; 8 × 6-pounder guns

USS Merrimack was a ship launched by an Association of Newburyport Shipwrights and presented to the Navy in 1798. She was the first ship of the Navy to be named for the Merrimack River. She saw action in the Quasi-War.

== Service history ==
Captain Moses Brown commanded Merrimack when she was placed in service in December 1798. She departed Boston on 3 January 1799 for the Windward Islands to protect American merchantmen in the Caribbean during the naval war with France. She arrived Prince Rupert Bay on the 20th, and, for the next two years, cruised in the West Indies and escorted convoys to the United States.

On 26 March 1799, she recaptured American brig "Harmony" that had been captured by French privateer schooner "La Resolue" and escorted her to Martinico. On 28 June 1799, she took her first prize L'Magicienne (62°29′N 16°51′W), the former American navy schooner USS Retaliation, captured on 20 November 1798 and taken into the French Navy. She took French letter-of-marque schooner Bounaparte 7 August and, with Ganges and Pickering, recaptured American schooner John on the 15th, after that ship had struck her colors to French privateer Revelleiu the day before. On 25 September 1799, she recaptured British schooner "Charming Nancy" that had been captured by a French privateer, later in the day she recaptured American sloop "Elizabeth" that the French had taken. On 8 December 1799, arrived at Cape Ann, Massachusetts, and then on into Boston. After returning to the West Indies, sometime before 24 April 1800, she recaptured American brig "Ann".

Merrimack recaptured American brig Ceres, 6 June 1800, after it had been taken by L'Hazard on 18 May 1800. On arriving off Curaçao, 22 September, she found that a French force of 16 ships from Guadeloupe was besieging the city with 1,400 men. That evening, with Patapsco, Merrimack stood into the harbor through heavy fire from French cannon and muskets. The American gunners replied with great spirit driving the enemy troops from their guns, but from time to time, during the night, the French soldiers renewed the cannonade. The next morning, the French troops reembarked in confusion and fled.

Merrimack captured French privateer sloop Phoenix on 20 October 1800, and later in the year took French privateer brig "Brilliant" (before 3 December). A list of American prizes credits Merrimack with recapturing British schooner Godfrey, but gives no details about the action.

In a letter dated 20 February 1801 to Josiah Parker, chairman of the Committee on Naval Affairs, Navy Secretary Stoddert recommended selling her. She was ordered to be placed in ordinary on 26 February. She was stripped of naval equipment and sold in 1801 at Boston for $21,154.50. Subsequently, while operating in merchant service under the name Monticello, the ship was lost off Cape Cod, Massachusetts the same year.
