= USS Patapsco (1799) =

Sloop-of-war of the United States Navy

History

United States
- Name: Patapsco
- Namesake: Patapsco River
- Launched: 20 June 1799
- Fate: Sold June 1801

General characteristics
- Tonnage: 380
- Length: 87 ft (27 m)
- Beam: 29 ft (8.8 m)
- Depth of hold: 12 ft (3.7 m)
- Complement: 180
- Armament: 20 guns

The first USS Patapsco was a sloop in the United States Navy.

Patapsco was launched as Chesapeake 20 June 1799 by Captain De Rochbruns, and renamed Patapsco between 10 October and 14 November, as both her and frigate Chesapeake, commissioned in 1800, had been given the same name. Name was changed to prevent confusion. She is referred to as Patapsco in letter dated 23 October 1799 written by the Navy Secretary. Patapsco is the name of a river in Maryland.

Sometime in 1800 while in the Delaware (unknown if River or Bay) she rescued the crew of schooner "Whim" that was on fire and put out the fire. Commanded by Captain Henry Geddes, she escorted the brig Acteon to New Orleans, carrying General James Wilkinson and his staff to that port, arriving 10 February 1800. She then cruised in the West Indies, protecting American shipping from French cruisers and privateers during the Quasi-War with France. Operating in Commodore Silas Talbot's squadron, she captured schooner Cecilia after a five-hour chase 28 May 1800. "Cecilia" was seized by a British privateer lugger from the prize crew the next day. On 7 August she captured French letter of marque Dorade. In the autumn she also engaged Louisa Bridge but the schooner escaped.

She aided Merrimack and a British frigate in defeating a French invasion of Curaçao, in the Netherlands Antilles, before returning to Philadelphia in December. In a letter dated 20 February 1801 to Josiah Parker, Chaiman of the Committee on Naval Affairs, Navy Secretary Stoddert recommended selling her. She was sold there in June 1801 by 7 June for $24,680.
