= Quasi-War =

Undeclared naval war between the United States and France, 1798–1800

Quasi-War (1798–1800)
- Part of the French Revolutionary Wars
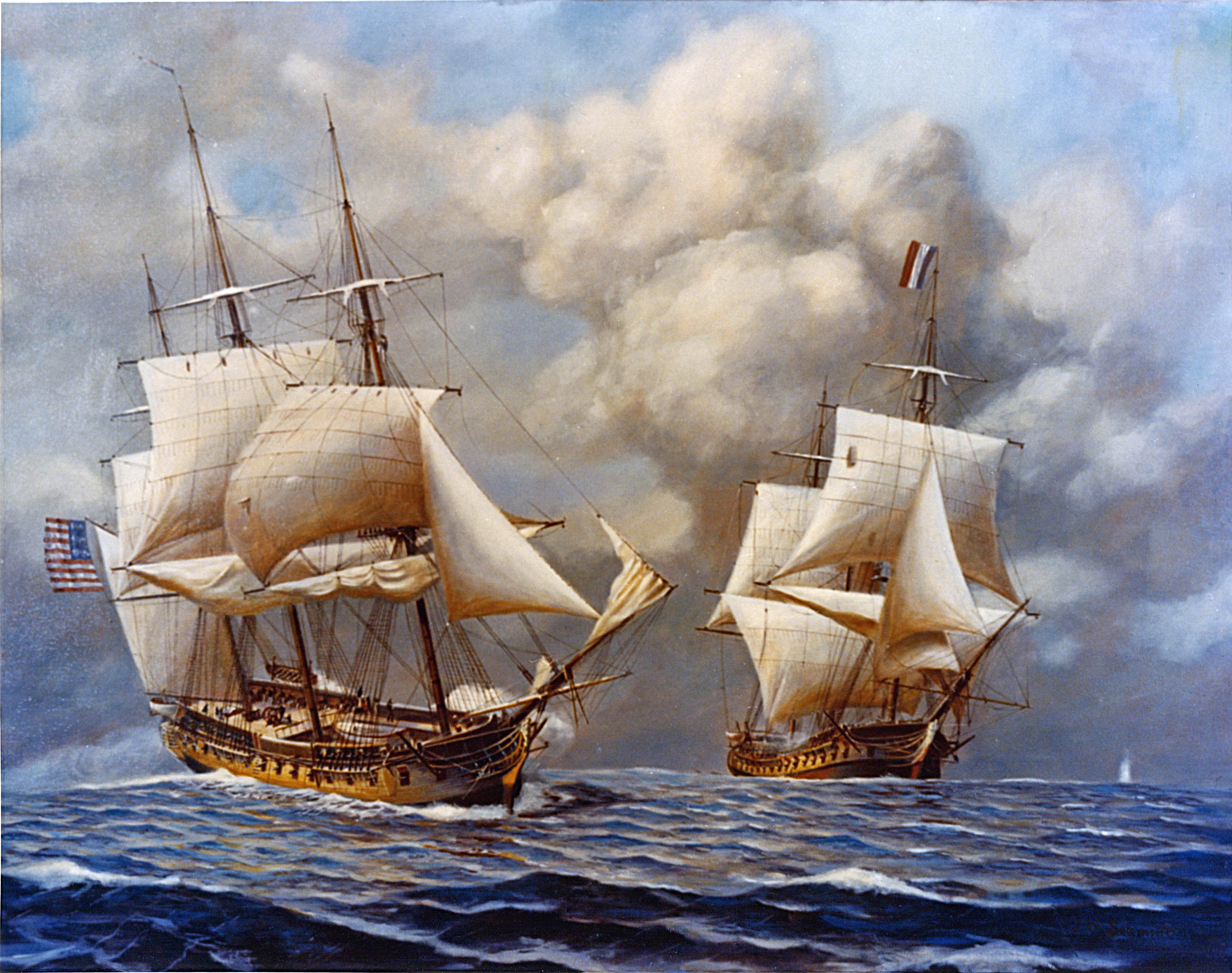
- USS Constellation in combat with French Insurgente
Date	7 July 1798 – 30 September 1800 (2 years, 2 months, 3 weeks and 2 days)
Location	Primarily Caribbean and East Coast of the United States, minor actions in Indian Ocean, and Mediterranean Sea
Result	Convention of 1800

Belligerents
United States	France

Commanders and leaders
John Adams; Benjamin Stoddert; Thomas Truxtun; Silas Talbot; William Bainbridge; Stephen Decatur; Alexander Hamilton	Napoleon Bonaparte; Paul Barras; Edme Desfourneaux; Victor Hugues; André Rigaud

Strength
Maximum 9 frigates, 4 sloops, 2 brigs, 3 schooners; 5,700 sailors and marines, up to 365 privateers	Unknown

Casualties and losses
c. 160 killed or wounded; 22 privateers, up to 2,000 merchant ships captured	100+ killed or wounded, 517 captured; Ships: 1 frigate, 2 corvettes, 1 brig; 118 privateers sunk or captured

The Quasi-War, (Note: French: Quasi-guerre) 1798 to 1800, was an undeclared war between the United States and the French First Republic. It was fought almost entirely at sea, primarily in the Caribbean and off the East Coast of the United States, with minor actions in the Indian Ocean and Mediterranean Sea.

In 1793, Congress suspended repayment of loans made by France during the American Revolutionary War. This was followed in 1794 by the Jay Treaty with Great Britain, then engaged in the War of the First Coalition with France. The French government responded by permitting privateer attacks on American ships trading with Britain, which in October 1796 was expanded to cover all ships operating in American waters, regardless of nationality.

The United States was initially unable to mount an effective response, with over 316 American ships captured in the first year. Congress reconstituted the United States Navy, and in July 1798 approved the use of force against France. By 1799, losses had been significantly reduced through informal cooperation with the Royal Navy, whereby merchant ships from both nations were allowed to join each other's convoys. The replacement of the First Republic by the Consulate in November 1799 led to the Convention of 1800, which ended the war.

The right of Congress to authorize military action without a formal declaration of war was later confirmed by the Supreme Court. This ruling has formed the basis of many similar actions since, including the Vietnam War and the Gulf War in the 20th century. (Note: Between 1776 and 2000, the United States engaged in over 115 undeclared wars, versus only five declared ie the War of 1812, Mexican–American War, Spanish–American War, World War I, and World War II.)

== Background ==
Under the 1778 Treaty of Alliance, the United States had agreed to protect the French West Indies in return for French support in the American Revolutionary War. Because the treaty had no termination date, France claimed this obligation included supporting them against Great Britain and the Dutch Republic during the 1792–1797 War of the First Coalition. Despite popular enthusiasm for the French Revolution, there was little support for this in Congress. Neutrality allowed New England shipowners to earn huge profits evading the British blockade of French ports, while the Southern planter class feared the example set by France's abolition of slavery in 1794.

In 1793, Congress suspended repayment of French loans incurred during the Revolutionary War, on the grounds that the execution of Louis XVI and dissolution of the former regime rendered existing agreements void. They further argued American military obligations were only valid in a defensive conflict, and thus did not apply, since France had declared war on Britain and the Dutch Republic. To ensure the U.S. did not become involved, Congress passed the Neutrality Act of 1794, while President George Washington issued an executive order forbidding American merchant ships from arming themselves.

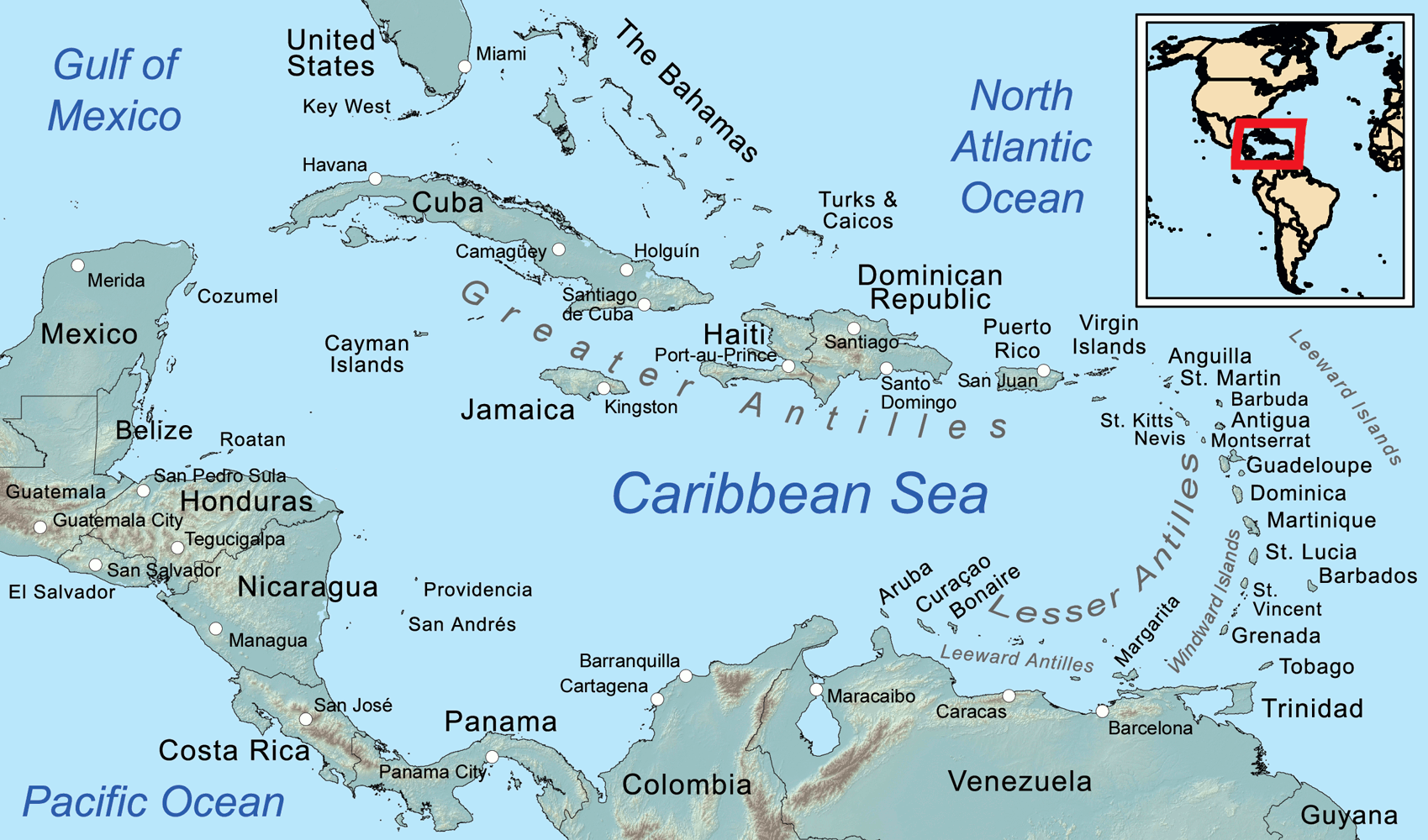
Caribbean, main focus of operations during the Quasi-War

The two countries agreed to set aside their differences and co-operate on the basis of "benevolent neutrality". However, France interpreted this as allowing their privateers to enter American ports, and sell captured British ships in American prize courts, but not vice versa, while the United States viewed it as the right to provide the same privileges to both. Tensions were exacerbated by the 1794 Jay Treaty between the United States and Britain, which led to a rapid expansion of trade, American exports to Britain rising from US$33 million in 1794 to $94 million by 1801.

In late 1796, French privateers began seizing American ships trading with the British, helped by the almost complete lack of a United States Navy. Their last warship had been sold in 1785, leaving only a small flotilla belonging to the United States Revenue Cutter Service and a few neglected coastal forts. From October 1796 to June 1797, French vessels captured 316 ships, 6% of the entire American merchant fleet, causing losses of $12 to $15 million. On 2 March 1797, the French Directory issued a decree permitting the seizure of any neutral shipping without a rôle d'équipage listing the nationalities of each crewman. Since American ships rarely carried such documents, France had effectively initiated a commerce war.

Diplomatic efforts to resolve the conflict ended in the 1797 dispute known as the XYZ Affair. However, the hostilities created support for establishing a limited naval force, and on 18 June, President John Adams appointed Benjamin Stoddert the first Secretary of the Navy. On 7 July 1798, Congress approved the use of force against French warships in American waters, but wanted to ensure conflict did not escalate beyond these limits. As a result, it was called a "limited" or "Quasi-War", and led to political debate over whether it was constitutional. A series of rulings by the Supreme Court of the United States confirmed the ability of the U.S. to conduct undeclared wars, or "police actions".

== Forces and strategy ==
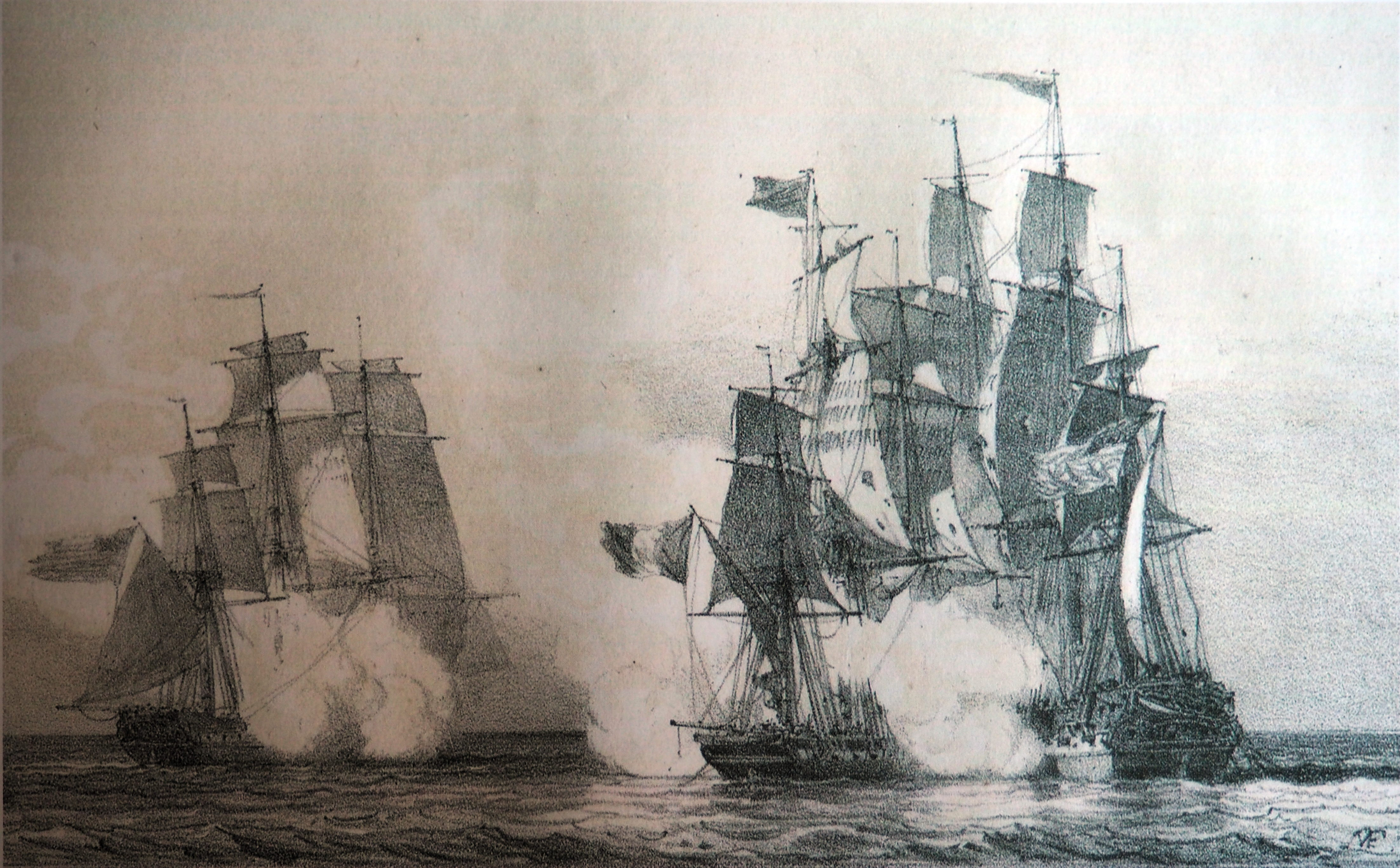
The French privateer Clarisse attacking the American merchantmen Louisa and Mercury on 3 January 1800

Since ships of the line were expensive to build and required highly specialised construction facilities, in 1794 Congress compromised by ordering six large frigates. By 1798, the first three were nearly complete and on 16 July 1798, additional funding was approved for the USS Congress, USS Chesapeake, and USS President, plus the frigates USS General Greene and USS Adams. The provision of naval stores and equipment by the British allowed these to be built relatively quickly, and all saw action during the war.

These vessels were enhanced by so-called "subscription ships", privately funded vessels provided by individual cities. They included five frigates, among them the USS Philadelphia, commanded by Stephen Decatur, and four merchantmen converted into sloops. Primarily intended to attack foreign shipping, they earned huge profits for their owners; the USS Boston captured over 80 enemy vessels, including the French corvette Berceau.

With most of the French fleet confined to Europe by the Royal Navy, Secretary Stoddert was able to focus resources on eliminating the few vessels that evaded the blockade and reached the Caribbean. The U.S. also needed convoy protection, and while there was no formal agreement with the British, considerable co-operation took place at a local level. The two navies shared a signal system, and allowed their merchantmen to join each other's convoys, most of which were provided by the British, who had four to five times more escorts available.

This freed the U.S. Navy to concentrate on French privateers, most of which had very shallow draft and were armed with a maximum of twenty guns. Operating from French and Spanish bases in the Caribbean, particularly Guadeloupe, they made opportunistic attacks on passing ships, before escaping back into port. To counter those tactics, the U.S. used similarly sized vessels from the Revenue Cutter Service, as well as commissioning their own privateers. The first American ship to see action was the USS Ganges, a converted East Indiaman with 26 guns, but most were far smaller.

The revenue cutter USS Pickering, commanded by Edward Preble, made two cruises to the West Indies and captured ten prizes. Preble turned command of Pickering over to Benjamin Hillar, who captured the much larger and more heavily armed French privateer Égypte Conquise after a nine-hour battle. In September 1800, the Pickering and her entire crew were lost at sea in a storm. Preble next commanded the frigate USS Essex, which he sailed around Cape Horn into the Pacific to protect U.S. merchantmen in the East Indies. He recaptured several U.S. ships that had been seized by French privateers.

The first significant study of the war was written by U.S. naval historian Gardner W. Allen in 1909, and focused exclusively on ship-to-ship actions. This is how the conflict is generally remembered in the U.S., but historian Michael Palmer argues American naval operations cannot be assessed in isolation. When operating in the Caribbean

... they entered a European theater where the war had been underway since 1793 ... British ships chased and fought the same French cruisers and privateers. Both navies escorted each other's merchantmen. American warships operated from British bases. And most importantly, British policies and shifts in deployment had dramatic effects on American operations.

== Significant naval actions ==
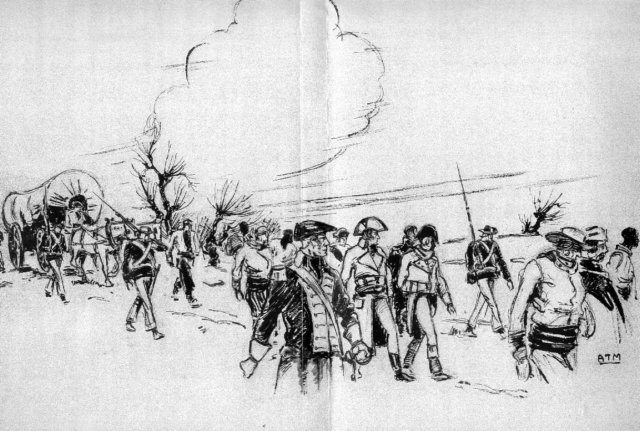
A 20th-century illustration depicting United States Marines escorting French prisoners

From the perspective of the U.S. Navy, the Quasi-War consisted of a series of ship-to-ship actions in U.S. coastal waters and the Caribbean; one of the first was the Capture of La Croyable on 7 July 1798 by Delaware outside Egg Harbor, New Jersey. On 20 November, a pair of French frigates, Insurgente and Volontaire, captured the schooner USS Retaliation, commanded by Lieutenant William Bainbridge; Retaliation was recaptured on 28 June 1799.

On 9 February 1799, the frigate Constellation captured the French Navy's frigate L'Insurgente. By 1 July, under the command of Decatur, USS United States had been refitted and repaired and embarked on her mission to patrol the South Atlantic coast and West Indies in search of French ships which were preying on American merchant vessels.

In the action of 1 January 1800, an American merchant convoy escorted by USS Experiment fought off an attack by 14 French privateer barges in the Gulf of Gonâve. On 1 February, Constellation severely damaged the French frigate La Vengeance off the coast of Saint Kitts, while suffering serious damage itself. Silas Talbot led a naval expedition during the Battle of Puerto Plata Harbor in early May, capturing a Spanish army controlled coastal fort and a French corvette. When French troops occupied Curaçao in July, USS Patapsco and USS Merrimack bombarded French positions on the island and landed marines to support the local Dutch troops before the French withdrew. On 12 October, the frigate Boston captured the corvette Le Berceau.

On 25 October, USS Enterprise defeated the French brig Flambeau near Dominica. Enterprise also captured eight privateers and freed eleven U.S. merchant ships from captivity, while Experiment captured the French privateers Deux Amis and Diane and liberated numerous American merchant ships. Although U.S. military losses were light, the French had seized over 2,000 American merchant ships by the time the war ended.

== Conclusion of hostilities ==
It has been suggested that since the war was primarily driven by domestic political considerations, neither side was able to identify what a successful resolution entailed. This was enhanced by the tendency of individual commanders to pursue their own objectives, and on the American side, focusing on ship to ship actions rather than overall strategy.

In any event, by late 1800 U.S. and British naval operations, combined with a more conciliatory diplomatic stance by the new French government, had significantly reduced privateer activity. The Convention of 1800, signed on 30 September, ended the Quasi-War. It affirmed the rights of Americans as neutrals upon the sea and abrogated the 1778 French alliance, but failed to provide compensation for the alleged $20 million in American economic losses. While the agreement ensured the U.S. remained neutral during the Napoleonic Wars, it failed to resolve the underlying tensions with warring European nations, which led to the War of 1812.

== See also ==
- Franco-American relations

== Sources ==
- Allen, Gardner Weld (1909). Our Naval War With France. Boston and New York: Houghton Mifflin. OCLC 1202325.
- Clodfelter, Micheal (2002). Warfare and Armed Conflicts: A Statistical Reference to Casualty and Other Figures 1500–1999. McFarland & Co. ISBN 978-0786412044.
- Coleman, Aaron (2008). "'A Second Bounaparty?' A Reexamination of Alexander Hamilton during the Franco-American Crisis, 1796–1801". Journal of the Early Republic. 28 (2): 183–214. doi:10.1353/jer.0.0004. JSTOR 30043587. S2CID 143138929.
- Combs, Jerald A (1992). The Jay Treaty: Political Battleground of the Founding Fathers. University of California Press. ISBN 978-0520015739.
- DeConde, Alexander (1966). The Quasi-War: The Politics and Diplomacy of the Undeclared War with France, 1797–1801. Charles Scribner's Sons.
- Eclov, Jon Paul (2013). Informal Alliance: Royal Navy And U.S. Navy Co-Operation Against Republican France During The Quasi-War And Wars of the French Revolution (PhD). University of North Dakota.
- Fehlings, Gregory E (2000). "America's First Limited War". Naval War College Review. 53 (3).
- Hickey, Donald R. (2008). "The Quasi-War: America's First Limited War, 1798–1801" (PDF). The Northern Mariner/Le Marin du Nord. XVIII (3–4).
- Hyneman, Charles (1930). "Neutrality during the European Wars of 1792–1815: America's Understanding Of Her Obligations". The American Journal of International Law. 24 (2): 279–309. doi:10.2307/2189404. JSTOR 2189404. S2CID 147162918.
- Knox, Dudley W., ed. (1939). Naval Documents related to the United States Wars with the Barbary Powers, Volume I. Washington: United States Government Printing Office.
- Lyon, E Wilson (1940). "The Franco-American Convention of 1800". The Journal of Modern History. XII (3): 305–333. doi:10.1086/236487. JSTOR 1874761. S2CID 144516482.
- Mackenzie, Alexander Slidell (1846). Life of Stephen Decatur: A Commodore in the Navy of the United States. C. C. Little and J. Brown.
- Mooney, James L., ed. (1983). Dictionary of American Naval Fighting Ships. Vol. 6. Defense Dept., Navy, Naval History Division. ISBN 978-0-16-002030-8.
- Palmer, Samuel Putnam (1989). Stoddert's War: Naval Operations During the Quasi War with France, 1798–1801. University of South Carolina Press. ISBN 0872494993.
- Rust, Randal (24 July 2023). "Quasi War – the Undeclared Naval War with France". American History Central. R.Squared Communications, LLC.
- Sechrest, Larry (2007). "Privately Funded and Built U.S. Warships in the Quasi-War of 1797–1801". The Independent Review. XII (1).
- Stansbury, David B Lt Commander (1992). "The Quasi-War with France". Naval History. 6 (3).
- Williams, Greg H. (2009). The French Assault on American Shipping, 1793–1813: A History and Comprehensive Record of Merchant Marine Losses. McFarland Publishers. ISBN 9780786454075.
- Young, Christopher J (2011). "Connecting the President and the People: Washington's Neutrality, Genet's Challenge, and Hamilton's Fight for Public Support". Journal of the Early Republic. 31 (3): 435–466. doi:10.1353/jer.2011.0040. JSTOR 41261631. S2CID 144349420.

Preceded by Irish Rebellion of 1798	French Revolution: Revolutionary campaigns Quasi-War	Succeeded by Peasants' War (1798)
