= François Pitot (naval officer) =

French Navy officer

François Marie Pitot was a French Navy officer.

He took part in the Battle of Groix commanding the frigate Républicaine française. In 1796, his ship, renamed Renommée, was captured by the 74-gun HMS Alfred. Pitot was acquitted by the court-martial for the loss of his ship.

In 1800, he captained Vengeance, fighting a battle against USS Constellation.

== Sources and references ==
- Fonds Marine. Campagnes (opérations; divisions et stations navales; missions diverses). Inventaire de la sous-série Marine BB4. Tome premier : BB4 1 à 482 (1790-1826)
- 2953 - NYMPHE, www.archeosousmarine.net
