= John Shaw =

John or Jack Shaw may refer to:

== Entertainment ==
- John Shaw (actor), American actor who portrayed Mr. Huff in Diary of a Wimpy Kid: Rodrick Rules
- John Shaw (baritone) (1924–2003), operatic baritone
- John Shaw (broadcaster) (1957–2013), English radio broadcaster
- John Shaw (painter) (1948–2019), American/Canadian artist
- John Shaw (photographer) (born 1944), American nature photographer
- John Shaw (stone carver) (born 1952), of Saxby, Lincolnshire
- John K. Shaw (born 1968), Scottish chess player

== Politics ==
- John Shaw (died 1690) (1617–1690), English politician
- Sir John Shaw, 1st Baronet (1615–1680), English merchant and politician
- Sir John Shaw, 3rd Baronet (c. 1679–1752), Scottish Whig politician
- John Shaw (Canadian politician) (1837–1917), Canadian politician and lawyer
- John Shaw (public servant) (1902–1983), New South Wales public servant
- John A. Shaw (1939-2020), U.S. government official
- John G. Shaw (1859–1932), U.S. Representative from North Carolina
- John Shaw (colonial administrator) (1894–1982), British colonial administrator

== Religion ==
- John Shawe or Shaw (1608–1672), English Puritan minister
- John Shaw (bishop) (1863–1934), American Roman Catholic archbishop
- John Luis Shaw (1870–1952), Seventh-day Adventist leader
- Jerome Shaw (John Robert Shaw, born 1946), bishop of the Russian Orthodox Church Outside of Russia

== Sports ==
- John Shaw (field hockey) (born 1962), England/GB field hockey international
- John Shaw (footballer, born 1886) (1886–1916), English footballer for Sunderland
- Jack Shaw (footballer, born 1916) (1916–1973), English footballer for Birmingham
- Jack Shaw (footballer, born 1924) (1924–2011), English footballer for Rotherham United and Sheffield Wednesday
- John Shaw (footballer, born 1954), Scottish footballer for Bristol City and Exeter City
- John Shaw (hurler) (born 1982), Irish hurler
- John Shaw (Kent cricketer) (1832–1912), English cricketer
- John Shaw (rugby league) (1934–2010), rugby league footballer for Great Britain and Halifax RLFC
- John Shaw (rugby union) (born 1968), Scottish rugby union player, coach and referee
- John Shaw (sailor) (1937–1995), Australian sailor and Olympic champion
- John Shaw (Victoria cricketer) (1931–2018), Australian cricketer
- Jack F. Shaw (1938–2009), Western Michigan University track & cross-country coach
- Jock Shaw (1912–2000), Scottish footballer for Airdrieonians and Rangers

== Other ==
- John Shaw (schooner), American ship
- John Shaw (cabinetmaker) (1745–1829), Annapolis cabinetmaker
- John Shaw (naval officer) (1773–1823), U.S. Navy captain
- John Shaw (oil driller), American oil driller, businessman and photographer
- John Shaw (slave trader), English slave trader and mayor of Liverpool
- John Shaw Sr. (1776–1832), English architect
- John Shaw (physician) (1792–1827), Scottish surgeon and anatomist
- John Shaw Jr. (1803–1870), English architect
- John Shaw, killed in the Canyon Diablo shootout in 1905, and subject of a famous postmortem photograph
- John Shaw (RAF officer) (1916–1976), British flying ace of the Second World War
- John Shaw (serial killer) (born 1945), murdered two women in Ireland in 1976 with accomplice Geoffrey Evans
- John Cargyll Shaw (1845–1900), neurologist
- John E. Shaw, U.S. Space Force general
- John James McIntosh Shaw, Scottish military surgeon
- John MacKay Shaw (1897–1984), business executive, bibliophile, philanthropist, and writer
- John Malach Shaw (1931–1999), U.S. federal judge
- John Shaw (colonel) (1783–1871), American businessman, soldier, and settler
- John S. Shaw, chairman of Sonat Inc., namesake of the Transocean John Shaw
- Sir Jack Shaw (accountant) (John Calman Shaw, 1932–2021), Scottish banker and academic
- Byam Shaw (John Byam Shaw, 1872–1919), British painter, illustrator, designer and teacher
- Transocean John Shaw, a 1982 semi-submersible drilling rig

== See also ==
- John Shawe (disambiguation)
- John Shore (disambiguation)
- Jonathan Shaw (disambiguation)
