= John Shaw (physician) =

Scottish surgeon and anatomist

- Born: 2 April 1792
- Died: 19 July 1827 (aged 34–35)
- Occupations: Surgeon and anatomist

John Shaw (2 April 1792 – 19 July 1827) was a Scottish surgeon and anatomist.

== Biography ==
Shaw was born 2 April 1792, was the son of Charles Shaw, clerk of the county of Ayr, and brother of Alexander Shaw, of Sir Charles Shaw, and of Patrick Shaw. At the age of fifteen he was sent to London to be a pupil of Charles (afterwards Sir Charles Bell, who became his brother-in-law. The connection thus formed lasted until Shaw's death. At the Great Windmill Street school he acted as superintendent of the dissecting-room, and on the death of Wilson became co-lecturer with Bell. The greater part of the experiments which led to Bell's discoveries on the nervous system were performed by Shaw, and he also took a large share in the work of forming Bell's anatomical museum. Bell's ‘Letters’ show in what affectionate regard he held him. Shaw accompanied Bell to Brussels immediately after Waterloo to study the effect of gunshot wounds. In 1821 he went to Paris to explain to the profession there Bell's methods of investigating the functions of the nervous system. In 1825 he was by a large majority elected surgeon to the Middlesex Hospital. This office he held until his death from fever on 19 July 1827. Bell wrote to his friend John Richardson on 21 July 1827: ‘I have lost my dear and best friend, John Shaw. He was the happiest creature in his death, laughing to see my exertions to relieve him.’

Shaw accomplished much good work during a short life. His principal works are:

‘A Manual of Anatomy,’ 1821; 2nd edit. 1822; 3rd edit. 2 vols. 1822. This book was republished in America, and was also translated into German; it was mainly intended for medical students, and was founded on the demonstrations given by Shaw at Great Windmill Street. ‘On the Effects on the Human Countenance of Paralysis of the Facial Nerves,’ 1822. ‘On the Nature and Treatment of the Distortions to which the Spine and the Bones of the Chest are subject,’ 1823–4. This is illustrated by a fine series of plates, mostly engraved by Thomas Landseer; it is a book of considerable merit, and is quoted at the present day as an authority on orthopædic surgery. In 1825 a supplement was issued, with the title ‘Further Observations on the Lateral or Serpentine Curvature of the Spine.’ Both the book itself and the supplement were translated into German. Shaw also edited the third edition of Bell's ‘Diseases of the Urethra.’ In the preface Bell pays a high tribute to Shaw's abilities as an anatomist.
