= John Shore (disambiguation) =

John Shore, 1st Baron Teignmouth was Governor-General of India.

John Shore may also refer to:

- John Shore (trumpeter) (1662–1752), English trumpeter and lutenist who invented the tuning fork
- Johnny Shore, Canadian football player
- John Shore (priest) on List of Archdeacons of Cardigan

== See also ==
- John Shaw (disambiguation)
- John Shawe (disambiguation)
