= David Shaw (minister) =

Scottish minister

David Shaw (1719–1810) was a Scottish minister who served as Moderator of the General Assembly of the Church of Scotland in 1775.

== Life ==
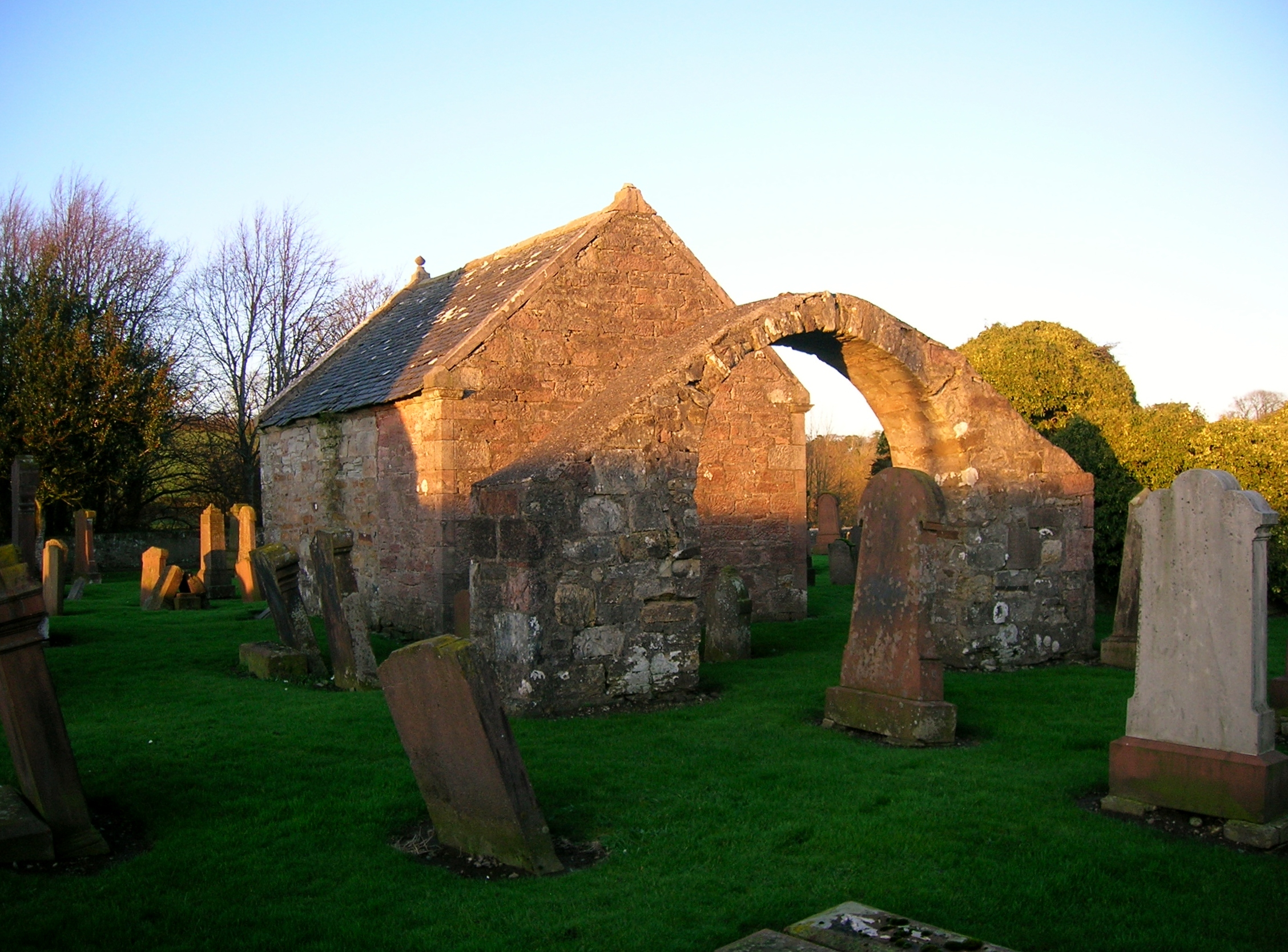
The ruins of Coylton Old Parish Church

He was born around 1719 the third son of Rev Alexander Shaw of Edinkillie in Morayshire and his wife, Grizel Munro. His brothers included Rev John Shaw of Greenock and Rev Andrew Shaw of St Madoes. In November 1743 David was licensed to preach by the Presbytery of Forres.

He was ordained as minister of Coylton in Ayrshire in 1749 and remained there all of his life. In 1775 he succeeded Rev Robert Henry as Moderator of the Church of Scotland. St Andrews University awarded him an honorary Doctor of Divinity in the same year.

He died on 26 April 1810 after 61 years of ministry at Coylton. His will is held by the National archive at Kew.

== Family ==
In November 1750 he was married to Marion Dalrymple, daughter of James Dalrymple of Ayr. Their children included Charles Shaw (1757-1827), who was Clerk to the Justiciary of the Peace of Ayrshire.

He was grandfather to Patrick Shaw WS. His granddaughter Barbara married Prof George Joseph Bell and a second granddaughter Marion married the eminent surgeon, Sir Charles Bell.
