= John Shawe (disambiguation) =

John Shawe was an English Puritan minister.

John Shawe may also refer to:

- John Shawe (died 1407), MP for Oxford
- John Shawe (died 1431), MP for Oxford

== See also ==
- John Shaw (disambiguation)
- John Shore (disambiguation)
