= George Smith (Scottish clergyman) =

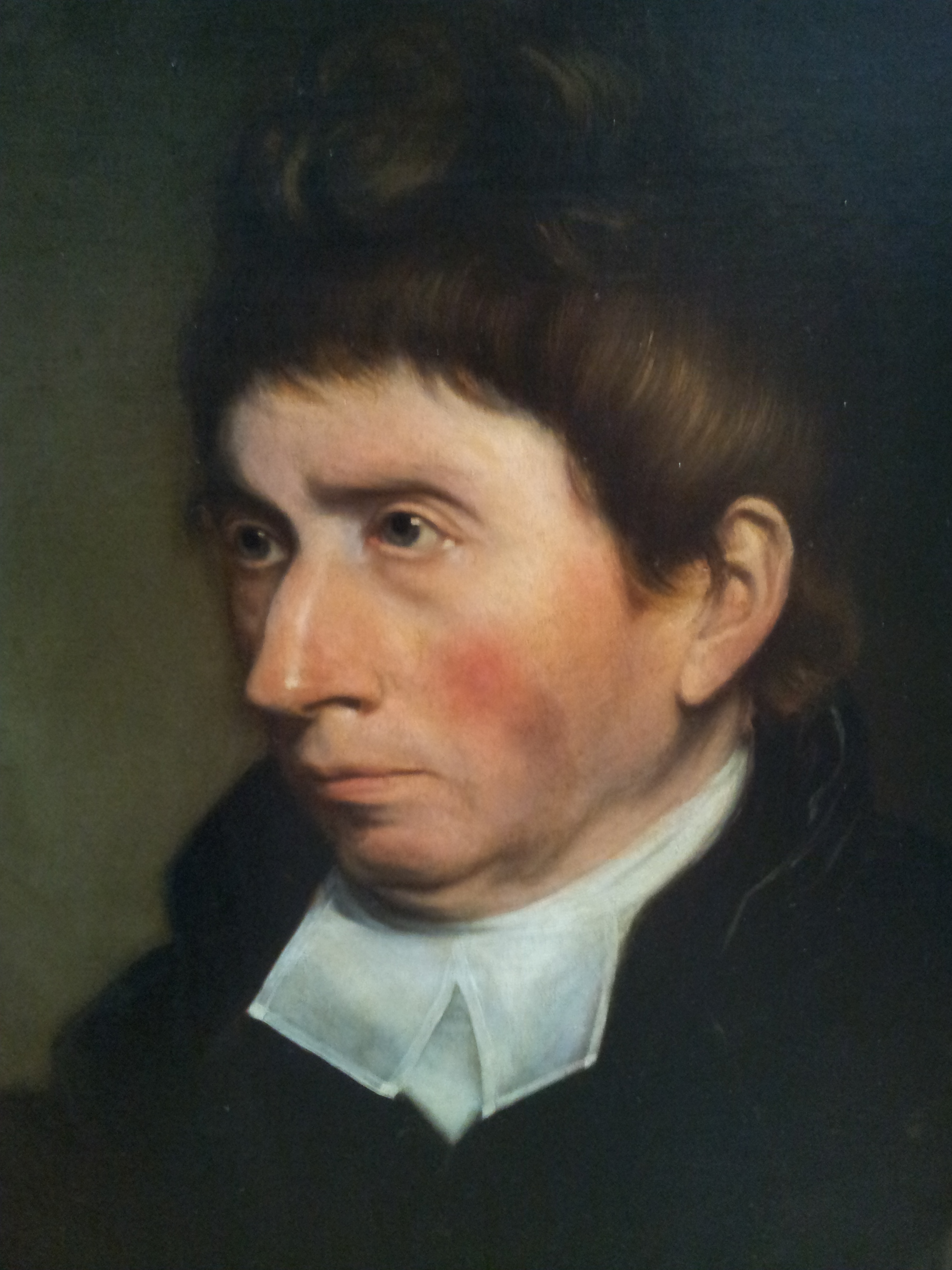
- Portrait by William Tannock
- Born: George Smith; 2 March 1749
- Died: 28 April 1823 (aged 74)

George Smith (1749–1823) was the minister at Galston, East Ayrshire, from 1778 until his death.

George Smith was the son of Reverend William Smith, Minister of Cranston and Jane Baird and was educated at Glasgow University.

He is mentioned three times in works by Robert Burns. Galston is a village in Ayrshire a few miles north of Burns's farm at Mossgiel. Burns had been reproved by Dr Smith, and Burns retaliated by pillorying Smith twice, by name, in "The Holy Fair", where he says that "his English tongue and gesture fine are a' clean oot o' season". He is also mentioned in "The Twa Herds" and "The Kirk's Alarm".

Reverend Smith married Marion Freer. Their daughter Henrietta ("Helen") Scott Smith married Lewis Balfour, a minister of nearby Sorn (later Minister at Collinton), and was the grandmother of Robert Louis Stevenson.

He is buried in Galston Parish Church (which was built during his ministry, opened on 18 June 1809). There is a memorial plaque to him and his widow, Marion Freer, on the south wall.

Their son Rev George Smith DD (1793–1866) was minister of the Tolbooth parish in Edinburgh.
