= USS Shaw (DD-373) =

Mahan-class destroyer

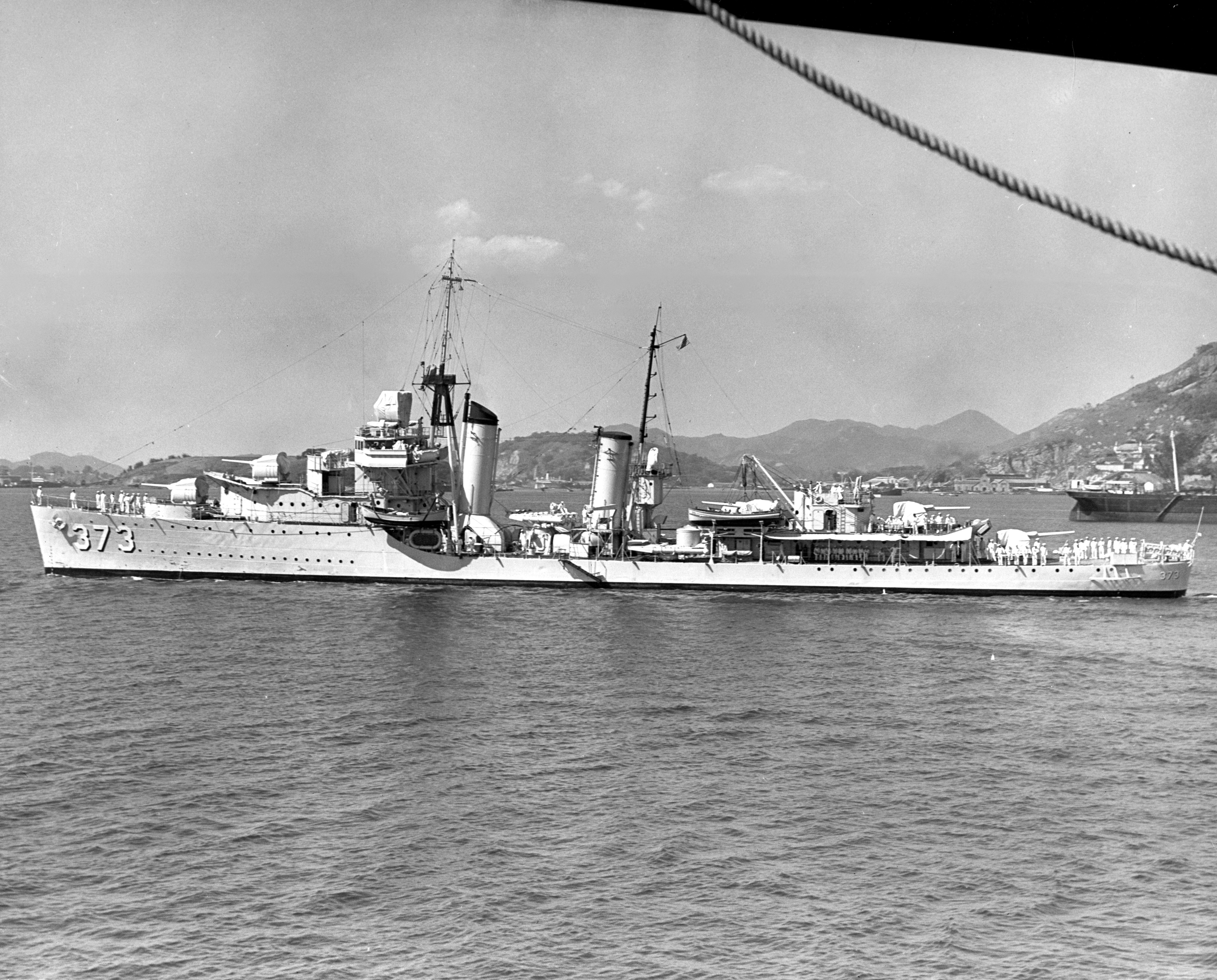
- USS Shaw (DD-373), September 1938

History

United States
- Namesake: Captain John Shaw
- Builder: Philadelphia Naval Shipyard
- Laid down: 1 October 1934
- Launched: 28 October 1935
- Commissioned: 18 September 1936
- Decommissioned: 2 October 1945
- Stricken: 4 October 1945
- Fate: Scrapped July 1946

General characteristics
- Class & type: Mahan-class destroyer
- Displacement: 1,450 long tons (1,470 t)
- Length: 341.3 ft (104.0 m)
- Beam: 34.7 ft (10.6 m)
- Draft: 17 ft (5.2 m)
- Speed: 35 knots (40 mph; 65 km/h)
- Complement: 204 officers and crew
- Armament: As Built: 1 × Gun Director above bridge; 5 × 5"(127 mm)/38 cal DP (5x1), 12 × 21 inch (533 mm) T Tubes (3x4), 4 × .50 cal (12.7 mm) MG AA (4x1), 2 × Depth Charge stern racks, c. 1944: 1 × Mk33 Gun Fire Control System, 4 × 5" (127 mm)/38 cal DP (4x1), 12 × 21 inch (533 mm) T Tubes (3x4), 2 × Mk51 Gun Directors, 4 × Bofors 40 mm AA (2x2), 6 × Oerlikon 20 mm AA (6x1), 2 × Depth Charge roll-off stern racks, 4 × K-gun depth charge projectors

USS Shaw (DD-373) was a Mahan-class destroyer and the second ship of the United States Navy to be named for Captain John Shaw, a naval officer. Commissioned in 1936, Shaw was plagued by construction deficiencies and was not fully operational until 1938. After training in the Atlantic, she was transferred to the Pacific and was berthed in a dry dock in Pearl Harbor on 7 December 1941.

Shaw sustained major damage from several bomb hits by Japanese forces during the attack on Pearl Harbor. The spectacular explosion of her forward magazine provided one of the most iconic photographs of the attack. She was repaired within a few months of the attack, and served in the Pacific through the rest of World War II, earning 11 battle stars.

Shaw was decommissioned in October 1945 and sold for scrap in July 1946.

== History ==
Shaw was laid down on 1 October 1934 at the Philadelphia Naval Shipyard, Philadelphia, Pennsylvania; launched on 28 October 1935, sponsored by Miss Dorthy L. Tinker; and commissioned on 18 September 1936.

Following commissioning, Shaw remained at Philadelphia until April 1937, when she crossed the Atlantic on her shakedown cruise. Returning to Philadelphia on 18 June, she commenced a year of yard work to correct deficiencies before completing acceptance trials in June 1938. Shaw conducted training exercises in the Atlantic for the remainder of the year. She then transited to the Pacific and underwent overhaul at Mare Island from 8 January to 4 April 1939.

Shaw remained on the West Coast until April 1940, participating in various exercises and providing services to carriers and submarines operating in the area. In April, she sailed for Hawaii, where she participated in Fleet Problem XXI, an eight-phased operation for the defense of the Hawaiian area. She remained in the Hawaiian area until November, when she returned to the West Coast for overhaul.

Back in the Hawaiian area by mid-February 1941, Shaw operated in those waters until November, when she entered the Navy Yard at Pearl Harbor for repairs, drydocking in YFD-2.

=== Attack on Pearl Harbor ===
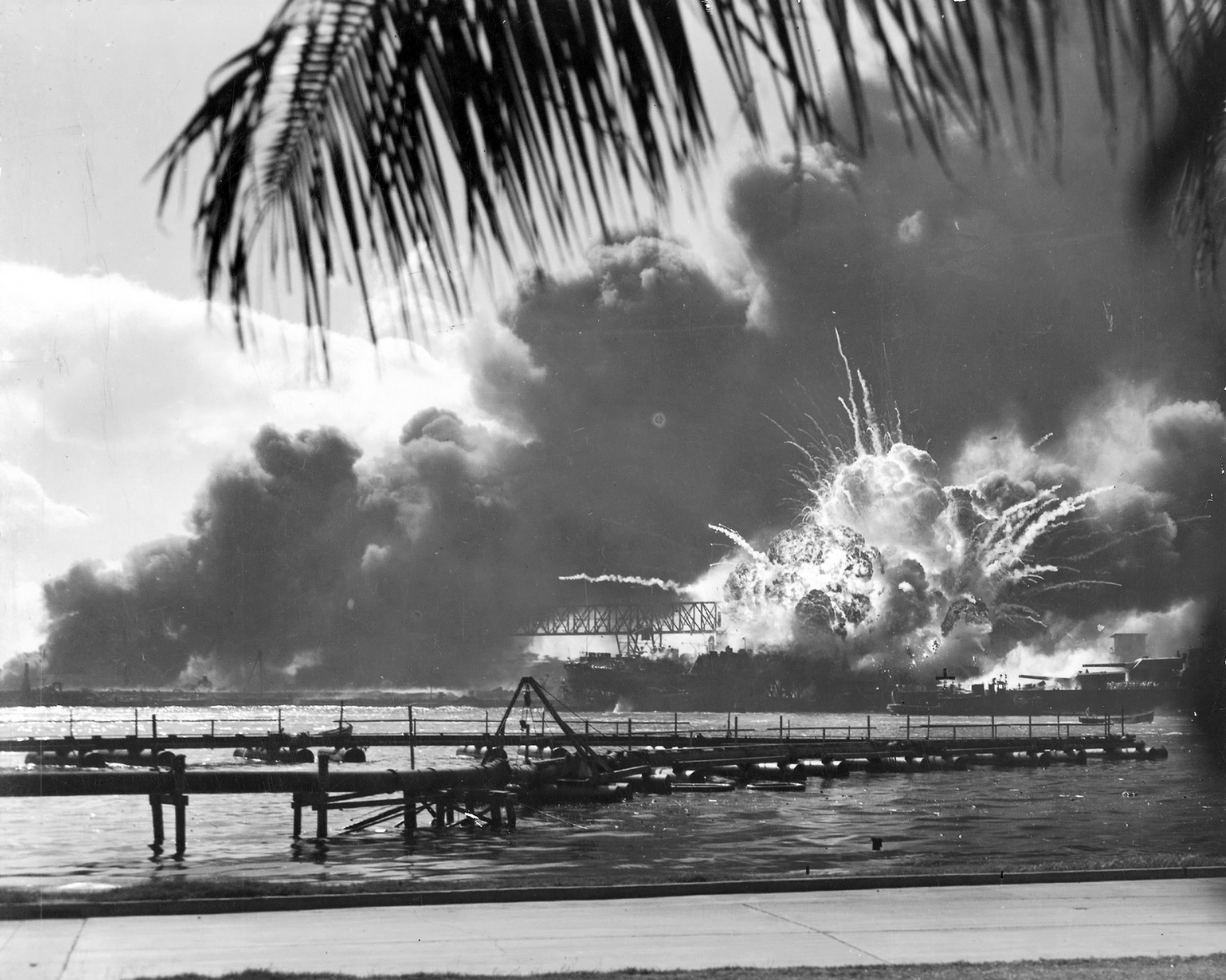
USS Shaw exploding after her forward magazine was detonated by the raging fire

On 7 December, Shaw was still in auxiliary floating drydock YFD-2, receiving adjustments to her depth charge mechanisms. During the Japanese attack, she took three hits – two bombs through the forward machine gun platform, and one through the port wing of the bridge. Fires spread through the ship. By 0925, all fire-fighting facilities were exhausted, and the order to abandon ship was given. Efforts to flood the dock were only partially successful, and shortly after 0930, her forward magazine exploded.

Temporary repairs were made at Pearl Harbor during December 1941 and January 1942. On 9 February, Shaw steamed towards San Francisco, where repairs were completed, including the installation of a new bow, at the end of June. Following training in the San Diego, California, area, Shaw returned to Pearl Harbor on 31 August 1942.

=== Further service in World War II ===
For the next two months, she escorted convoys between the West Coast and Hawaii. In mid-October, as a unit of a carrier force centered on the Enterprise, Shaw departed from Pearl Harbor and steamed westwardly. Meeting with a carrier force centered on Hornet, the two carrier groups united as Task Force 61, and then moved north of the Santa Cruz Islands to intercept enemy forces headed to attack Guadalcanal.

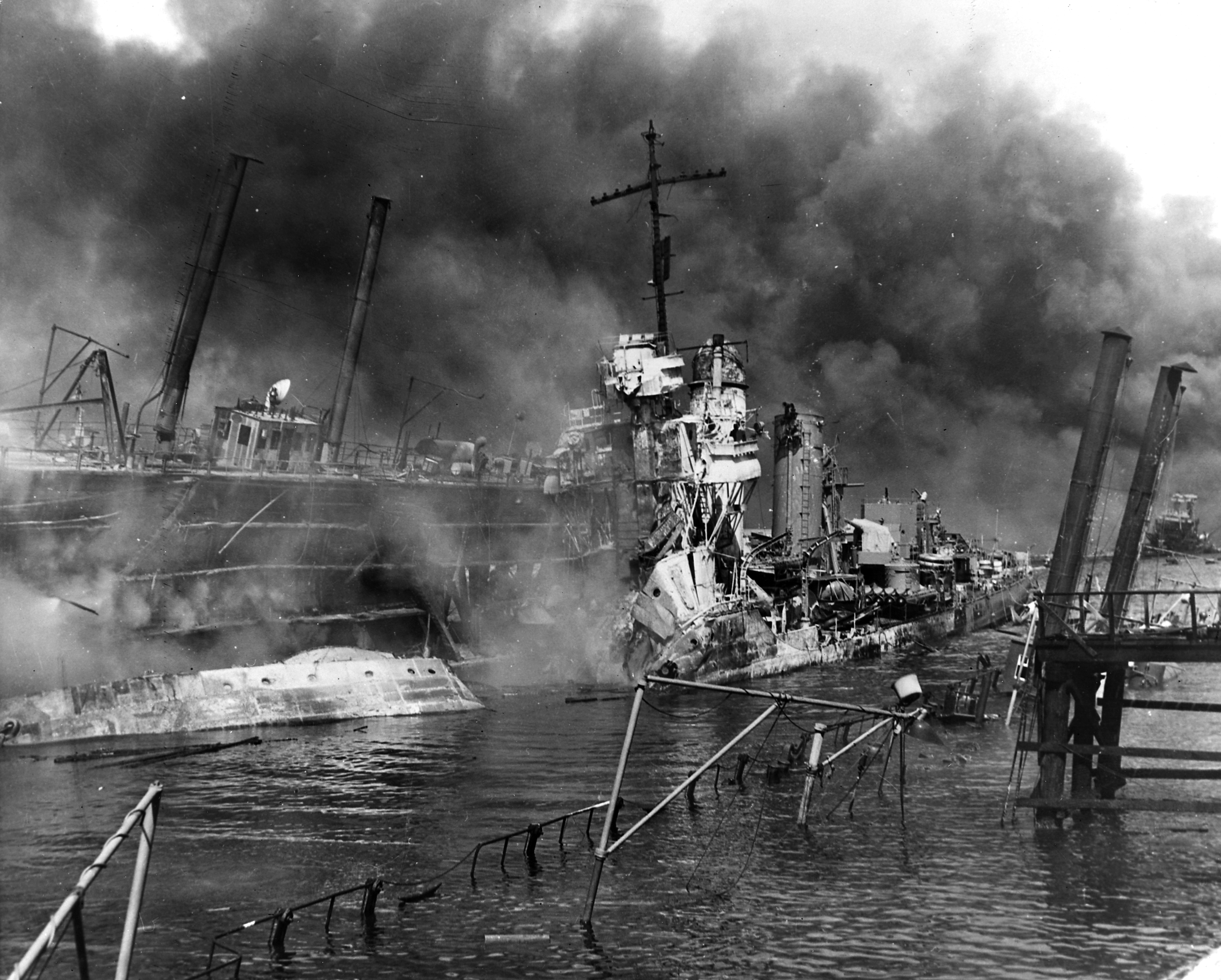
Wreckage of bombed Shaw at Pearl Harbor

By mid-morning on the 26th, both carrier groups were under attack. As an accompanying ship, Porter, stopped to pick up survivors from a downed torpedo plane, she was torpedoed. Shaw went to Porter's assistance. Half an hour later, she was ordered to take off Porter's crew and sink the disabled destroyer. Periscope sightings followed by depth charge attacks delayed execution of the mission. By noon, however, the transfer was completed. An hour later, Porter was gone, and Shaw left the scene to rejoin the task force.

Two days later, Shaw headed for the New Hebrides, where she commenced escorting ships moving men and supplies to Guadalcanal. She continued that duty through November and December and into January 1943. On 10 January, while entering Nouméa Harbor, New Caledonia, Shaw ran aground on Sournois Reef. She was freed on the 15th, but extensive damage to her hull, propellers, and sound gear necessitated temporary repairs at Nouméa – followed by lengthy repairs and rearmament at Pearl Harbor, which took through September.

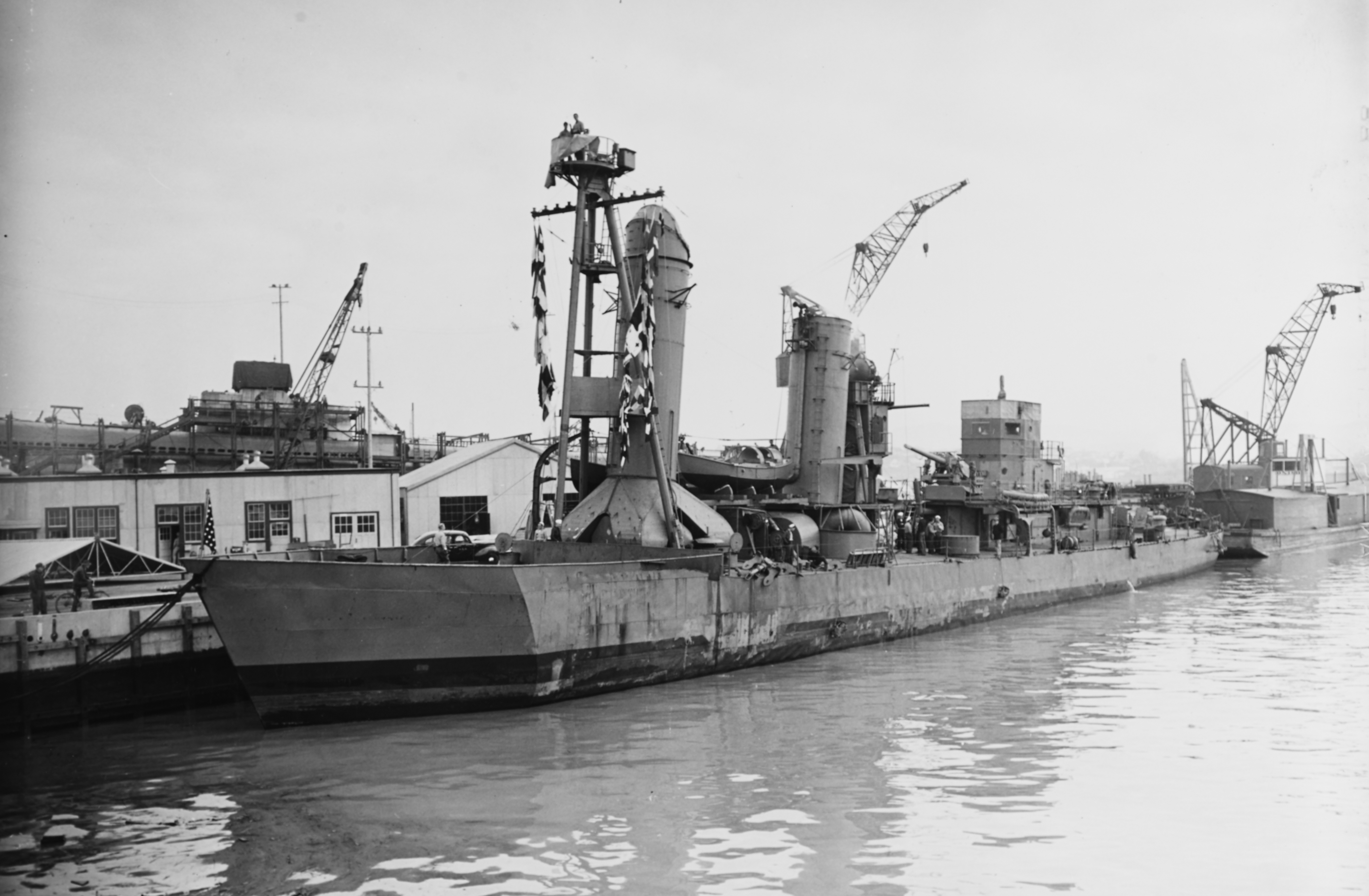
USS Shaw (DD-373) with her temporary bow and conning tower on tripod mast.

On 6 October, Shaw headed west again, reaching Nouméa on the 18th and Milne Bay, New Guinea, on the 24th. Now a unit of the 7th Amphibious Force, Shaw escorted reinforcements to Lae and Finschhafen for the remainder of October and during November. Following a diversionary assault by Army troops against Umtingalu, New Britain, on 15 December, Shaw recovered survivors from two rubber boats and escorted HMAS Westralia and Carter Hall back to Buna, Papua New Guinea.

On 25 December, Shaw escorted units engaged in the assault against Cape Gloucester, where she provided gunfire support and served as fighter director ship. On the 26th, Shaw sustained casualties and damage when attacked by two "Vals." Thirty-six men were injured, three of whom later died of their wounds. The Shaw returned to Cape Sudest, New Guinea, on the 27th; she transferred her wounded and dead to shore facilities there, and continued on to Milne Bay for temporary repairs. Permanent repairs were completed at Hunter's Point, California, on 1 May 1944.

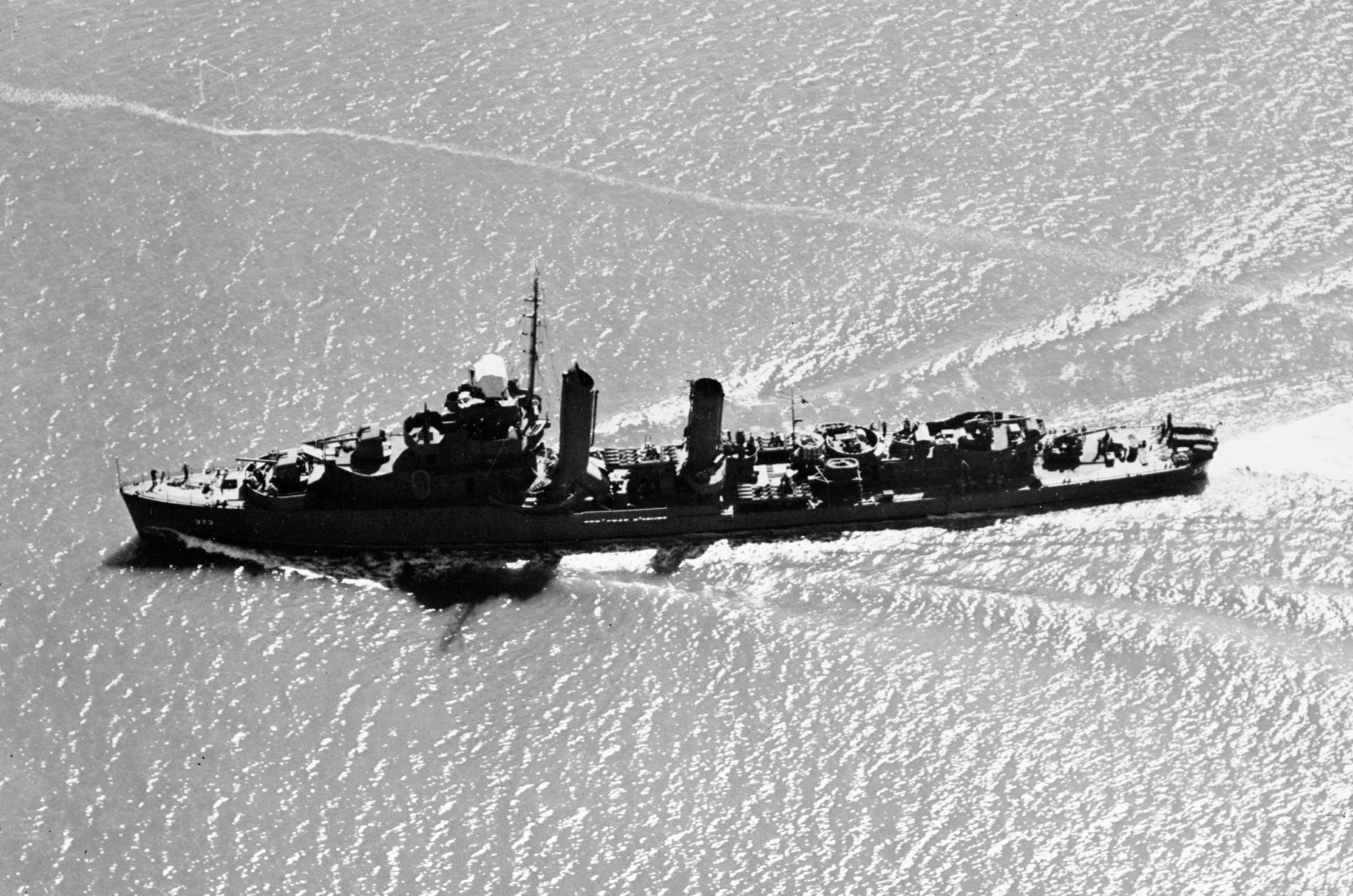
USS Shaw (DD-373) after bow replacement

Shaw returned to Pearl Harbor on the 10th, joined the 5th Fleet there, and steamed toward the Marshall Islands on the 15th. She got underway from the Marshalls on 11 June with TF-52 to engage in the assault on Saipan Island. Four days later, the attack began. For the next three and one-half weeks, the destroyer rotated between screening and "call fire" support duties of the Marines on shore. In mid-July, Shaw was back in the Marshall Islands. On the 18th, Shaw got underway to return to the Mariana Islands accompanying the Guam assault forces. During the action that followed, Shaw performed escort and patrol duties.

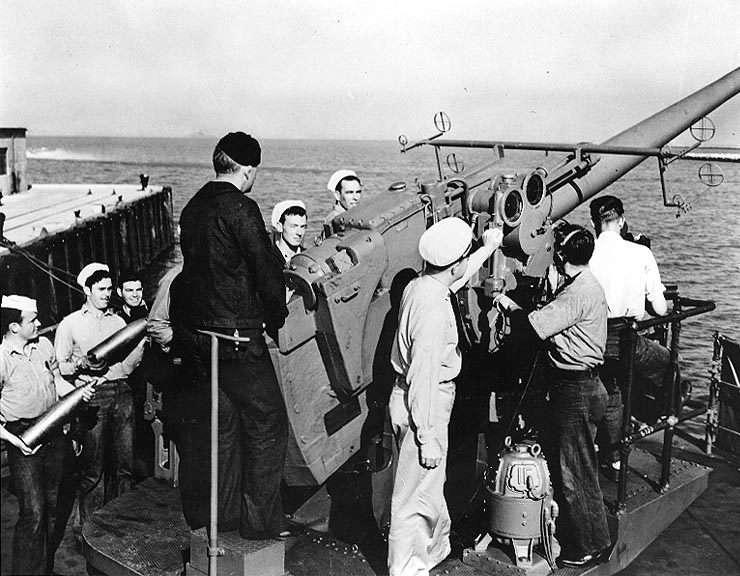
Training on the 5"/38 caliber gun

On 23 September, Shaw departed the Marianas. Following a tender repair availability at Eniwetok, she rejoined the 7th Amphibious Force on 20 October and headed for Leyte Gulf on the 25th. Convoy escort duties between the Philippines and New Guinea involved Shaw until the invasion of Luzon took place at Lingayen Gulf on 9 January 1945. From the 9th to the 15th, she performed screening, "call fire" support for the soldiers ashore, night illumination with star shells, and shore bombardment missions. Following this operation, Shaw was involved in the recapture of Manila Bay, Luzon. After the Luzon operations, Shaw supported the assault and occupation of Palawan Island during the period from 28 February to 4 March.

In early April, Shaw operated in the Visayas, setting two Japanese barges on fire off Bohol on 2 April. Damaged soon thereafter on an uncharted pinnacle, she underwent temporary repairs. On the 25th, she steamed toward the United States West Coast. Shaw arrived at San Francisco on 19 May. Repairs and upgrades to her systems continued into August. The work was completed on the 20th. Shaw then departed for the East Coast of the United States. Upon her arrival at Philadelphia, the warship was routed to New York City for deactivation. Decommissioned on 2 October 1945, her name was stricken from the Navy List two days later. Her hull was scrapped in July 1946.

Shaw earned 11 battle stars during World War II.
