= USS Enterprise vs Flambeau =

Naval battle in 1800

- Part of the Quasi-War
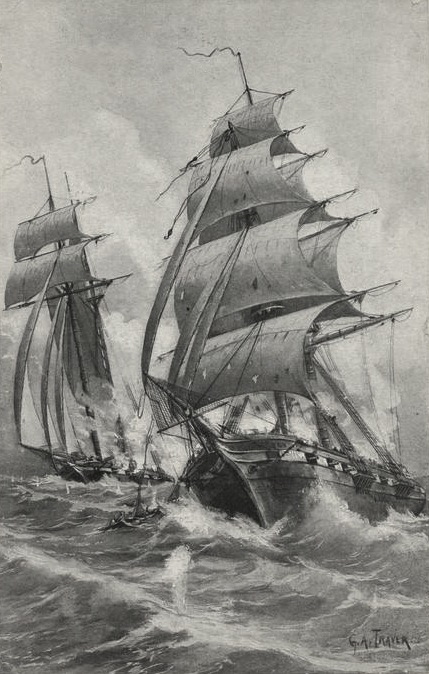
- USS Enterprise engaging the French privateer Flambeau
Date	25 October 1800
Location	Off the east coast of Dominica
Result	American victory

Belligerents
United States	France

Commanders and leaders
John Shaw	(France) Unknown

Strength
1 Schooner; 83 men 12 six-pounder guns	1 Brig; 110 men 12 eight-pounder guns

Casualties and losses
3 killed 7 wounded	7 killed 33 wounded 70 prisoners 1 Brig captured

USS Enterprise vs Flambeau was a single ship action fought in October 1800 during the Quasi-War, and the final battle between French and American forces. During the action, USS Enterprise defeated the French brig Flambeau off the leeward side of the island of Dominica in the Caribbean Sea. Although Enterprise was outgunned by Flambeau, she was still able to take her as a prize after a short battle. The battle helped bring to fame Enterprise's commanding officer, John Shaw, who added the capture of Flambeau to his already long list of French prizes.

Enterprise continued patrolling the Caribbean, chasing down and capturing French vessel Pauline, and later Guadaloupeenne. Chronic illness forced Shaw to transfer command of Enterprise to Lieutenant Andrew Sterett, who continued the patrol and took several more French prizes before returning home.

== Background ==
During the Quasi-War American merchant ships often became the target of French privateers who seized them in large quantities. In an effort to stem these depredations against American shipping several United States Navy warships were dispatched to hunt down French privateers. One such vessel was USS Enterprise, an American naval schooner under the command of Lieutenant John Shaw. Enterprise had been sent out to the Caribbean Sea in March 1800 with orders to cruise against French shipping in the region. Enterprise had already previously engaged and defeated several French privateers when on the night of 24 October she sighted the privateer Flambeau off the leeward side of Dominica.

The French letter of marque Flambeau was a brig that was slightly more powerful than Enterprise, having twelve 8-pounder (3.6 kg) cannon as compared to the American schooner's dozen 6-pounder (2.7 kg) guns. The French privateer also had more crew than the American vessel, 110 opposed to Enterprise's 83. With a broadside of 48 pounds (22 kg) to Enterprise's 36 pounds (16 kg) and with a larger crew, Flambeau had an advantage over Enterprise. Nonetheless, Shaw decided to engage Flambeau. Enterprise could not catch up to Flambeau but when morning came Flambeau found herself becalmed. Her captain then used sweeps to close with Enterprise.

== Action ==
Eventually a wind came and the two ships managed to maneuver towards each other until they were within musket range. After engaging with small arms for a while, Lieutenant Shaw eventually veered his schooner away and Flambeau opened up on the Americans with a broadside of roundshot. Enterprise replied with her own broadside and the two vessels engaged each other with cannon for twenty minutes. Flambeau was beginning to receive heavy damage when her captain decided to disengage and maneuvered away from Enterprise. However, Enterprise pursued the French brig and continued to engage her.

Flambeau's foretopmast was in danger of being dismasted from damage it had received from Enterprise, so the French captain sent men aloft to try to repair it. However after a sudden gust of wind the mast flew off the ship carrying six French sailors with it. Enterprise ceased her attacks upon Flambeau and sent out a boat to rescue the French sailors adrift on the topmast. After rescuing the French topmen, Enterprise caught up with the French brig and came alongside. Before the action could continue the French captain struck her colours as Flambeau's medicine chest had been destroyed and the hull compromised multiple times.

== Aftermath ==
The entire action lasted about forty minutes. The French were much worse off than the Americans in terms of casualties, with 7 Frenchmen killed and 33 wounded compared to 3 Americans killed and 7 wounded. A prize crew from Enterprise was sent aboard Flambeau and sailed her to Saint Kitts where she was condemned. The proceeds from the sale of Flambeau were adjudicated to the crew of Enterprise.

The capture of Flambeau brought further acclaim to Shaw, who had already defeated several other French privateers and taken them as prizes. Enterprise continued her cruise, next chasing down and capturing Pauline and later Guadaloupeenne. Shortly afterward, chronic illness forced Shaw to transfer command of the vessel to Lieutenant Andrew Sterett. Sterret continued to cruise the Caribbean, taking several more prizes before returning home. Upon Shaw's return home the president and other public officials personally thanked him for his service. Shaw later continued his naval career, serving with distinction during the War of 1812.
