= Jonathan Shaw =

Jonathan Shaw may refer to:

- Jonathan Shaw (British Army officer) (born 1957)
- Jonathan Shaw (cricketer) (born 1980), English cricketer
- Jonathan Shaw (photographer), British photographer and educator
- Jonathan Shaw (politician) (born 1966), British Labour Party politician
- Jonathan Shaw (tattoo artist) (born 1953), American tattoo artist

== See also ==
- John Shaw (disambiguation)
