= George Chalmers (antiquarian) =

Scottish antiquarian and political writer

George Chalmers (December 1742 – 31 May 1825) was a Scottish antiquarian and political writer.

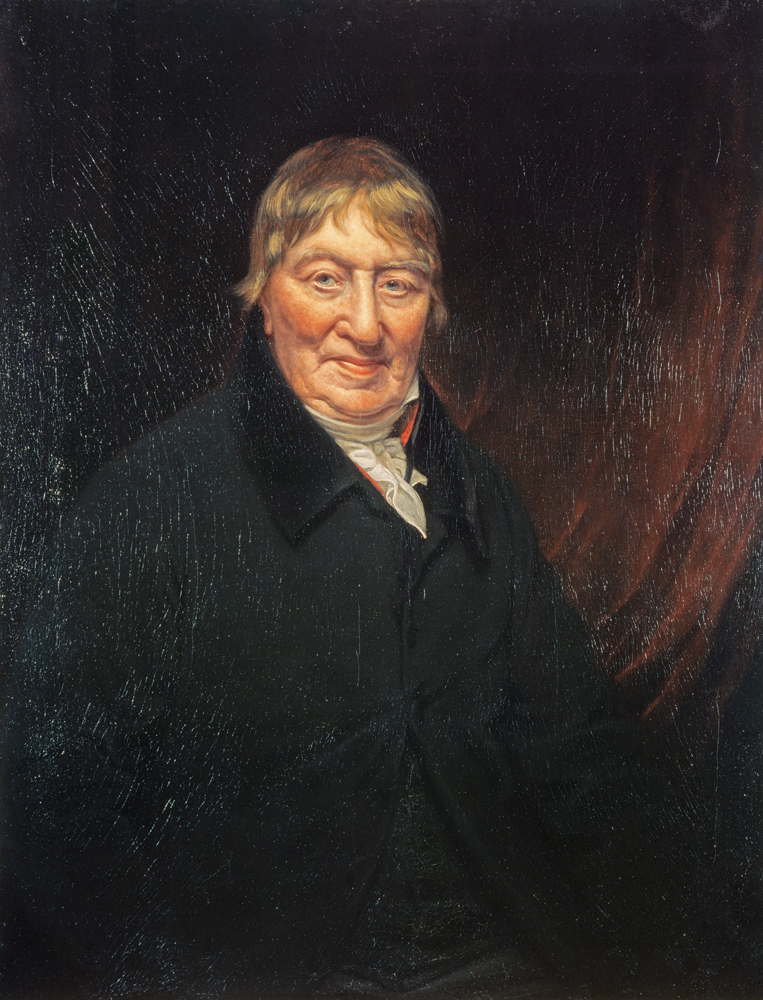
Chalmers, 1824 portrait by James Tannock

== Biography ==
Chalmers was born at Fochabers, Moray, the second son of the local postmaster, James Chalmers (who was a grandson of George Chalmers of Pittensear in Lhanbryde) and his wife Isabella. After completing a course at King's College, Aberdeen, he studied law at the University of Edinburgh for several years.

Two uncles on the father's side had settled in British North America, and Chalmers visited Maryland in 1763, apparently to assist in recovering a tract of land about which a dispute had arisen. He began practising as a lawyer at Baltimore. As a Loyalist, however, at the outbreak of the American War of Independence, he abandoned his professional prospects and returned to Great Britain. Several years then passed before he found adequate employment.

In August 1786, Chalmers was appointed chief clerk to the committee of Privy Council on matters relating to trade, following its re-establishment. He retained this position for the rest of his life. It left him time to write.

Chalmers was a fellow of the Royal Society and the Society of Antiquaries of London, an honorary member of the Antiquarian Society of Scotland, and a member of other learned societies. His library was left to his nephew, at whose death in 1841 it was sold and dispersed.

== Controversialist ==
A dogmatic writer, Chalmers became involved in numerous literary controversies. Among his avowed opponents were Edmond Malone and George Steevens, the Shakespeare editors; Thomas James Mathias, the author of the Pursuits of Literature; Dr John Jamieson, the Scottish lexicographer; John Pinkerton, the historian; David Irving, the biographer of the Scottish poets; and James Currie of Liverpool.

== Works ==
=== Caledonia ===
Chalmers's major work was his Caledonia, which he left incomplete. The first volume appeared in 1807, and is introductory to the others. It is divided into four books, treating successively of the Roman, the Pictish, the Scottish and the Scoto-Saxon periods, from 80 to 1306 AD. The books present, in a condensed form, with an account of the people, the language and the civil and ecclesiastical history, as well as the agricultural and commercial state of Scotland during the first thirteen centuries of the Common Era. The chapters on the Roman period are marred by the author's having accepted as genuine Charles Bertram's forgery De Situ Britanniae.

The second volume, published in 1810, gives an account of the seven southeastern counties of Scotland – Roxburgh, Berwick, East Lothian ("Haddington"), Edinburgh/Midlothian (all as "Edinburgh"), West Lothian ("Linlithgow"), Peebles and Selkirk – each covered by name, situation and extent, natural objects, antiquities, establishment as shires, civil history, agriculture, manufactures and trade, and ecclesiastical history.

In 1824 the third volume appeared, giving, under the same headings, a description of the seven south-western counties – Dumfries, Kirkcudbright, Wigtown, Ayr, Lanark, Renfrew and Dumbarton. In the preface to this volume the author stated that the materials for the history of the central and northern counties were collected.

=== Early works (1776–1786) ===
Before his Privy Council appointment, Chalmers applied himself to investigating the history and establishment of the English colonies in North America, based on his access to the state papers and other documents of what were then termed the plantation records. His work, Political Annals of the present United Colonies from their Settlement to the Peace of 1763, (1780), was to have formed two volumes; but the second, for the period between 1688 and 1763, never appeared. The first volume traces the original settlement of the different American colonies, and the changes in their constitutions and forms of government, as affected by British politics.

Chalmers next wrote An Estimate of the Comparative Strength of Britain during the Present and Four Preceding Reigns (1782), which passed through several editions.

=== Mature works (1786–1824) ===
Chalmers wrote biographical sketches of Daniel Defoe, Sir John Davies, Allan Ramsay, Sir David Lyndsay, Thomas Churchyard and others, for editions of their works. The British government also paid Chalmers £500 to write a hostile biography of Thomas Paine; he published it under the assumed name of Francis Oldys, A.M., of the University of Pennsylvania. A life of Thomas Ruddiman, whom he admired, combined praise for the subject with an attack on the reputation of his contemporary James Anderson.

In 1818 Chalmers published a life of Mary, Queen of Scots, based on a manuscript left by John Whitaker, but rewritten. Mary's history occupied much of his attention, and his last work, A Detection of the Love Letters lately attributed in Hugh Campbell's work to Mary Queen of Scots, is an exposure of an attempt to represent as genuine some fictitious letters said to have passed between Mary and Bothwell. He had also prepared for the press a detailed history of the life and reign of David I of Scotland. In his later researches he was assisted by his nephew James, son of Alexander Chalmers, writer in Elgin.

Apology for the Believers in the Shakespeare Papers which were exhibited in Norfolk Street, appeared in 1797, followed by other tracts by Chalmers on the same subject, relating to the Ireland Shakespeare forgeries. He also took part in the controversy on the identity of Junius, and in The Author of Junius Ascertained, from a Concatenation of Circumstances amounting to Moral Demonstration (1817) asserted that the Junius letters were written by Hugh Boyd. In 1824 he published The Poetical Remains of some of the Scottish Kings, now first collected; and in the same year he edited, for the Bannatyne Club, Robene and Makyne and the Testament of Cresseid, by Robert Henryson.

Political writings by Chalmers included:

- Collection of Treaties between Great Britain and other Powers (1790);
- Vindication of the Privileges of the People in respect to the Constitutional Right of Free Discussion, etc. (1796), published anonymously;
- A Chronological Account of Commerce and Coinage in Great Britain from the Restoration till 1850 (1810);
- Opinions of Eminent Lawyers on various points of English Jurisprudence, chiefly concerning the Colonies, Fisheries, and Commerce of Great Britain (1814);
- Comparative Views of the State of Great Britain before and since the War (1817).

== Chalmers' works online ==
- Political annals of the present United Colonies: ... (1779)
- An Estimate of the Comparative Strength of Britain during the Present and Four Preceding Reigns (1782)
- The Life of Thomas Ruddiman (1794)
- An Apology for the Believers in the Shakespeare Papers which were exhibited in Norfolk Street (1797)
- The Life of Mary, Queen of Scots, Derived from State Papers Volume 1 Volume 2 (1818)
- A supplemental apology for the believers in the Shakspear papers (1799)
- Caledonia (1888–1894 republication): Vols 3–7 (NLS), corresponding to the original books 2 and 3.
