= Alexander Shaw (surgeon) =

Alexander Shaw (6 February 1804 – 18 January 1890) was a Scottish surgeon.

== Life ==
Born in Ayr, he was the sixth son of Charles Shaw, clerk of the county of Ayr, and Barbara Wright his wife, daughter of a collector of customs at Greenock. His elder brothers were John Shaw, Sir Charles Shaw and Patrick Shaw. One sister, Marion, married Sir Charles Bell, and another sister became the wife of George Joseph Bell. He was educated at Edinburgh high school and the University of Glasgow, where he matriculated in 1819 and graduated M.A. 11 April 1822.

Shaw was connected with the Middlesex Hospital for more than half a century. He entered there as a pupil in 1822; was made assistant surgeon in 1836, and surgeon in 1842. On his retirement in 1872 he was appointed consulting surgeon. He joined the medical school of the hospital at its first formation, and at the time of his death was the sole survivor of the original members of the staff. To obtain an M.D. degree, he was admitted as a pensioner at Downing College, Cambridge, 28 June 1826.

In 1827, on the death of his brother John, Shaw left Cambridge to take up his work at the Great Windmill Street medical school; and he abandoned the idea of taking his Cambridge degree. He passed the examination required to obtain the license of the Society of Apothecaries in 1827, and in the following year obtained the membership of the Royal College of Surgeons of England. On the institution of the fellowship of the college, Shaw was elected one of the first batch of fellows on 11 December 1843. He served on the college council from 1858 to 1865.

Shaw was active in London medical societies. In the Royal Medical and Chirurgical Society he served as secretary, vice-president, and treasurer, and in its Transactions he published on rickets. Sir Charles Bell married Marion, Shaw's sister, on 3 June 1811. After the death of her husband in 1842 Lady Bell lived with her brother, and their house became a centre for the literary and scientific society of the period. Incapacitated from work for some years before his death, Shaw died 18 January 1890, at the age of 86.

== Works ==
Shaw's major works were:

- ‘Narrative of the Discoveries of Sir Charles Bell in the Nervous System,’ 1839.
- ‘Account of Sir Charles Bell's Classification of the Nervous System,’ 1844.
- ‘On Sir Charles Bell's Researches in the Nervous System,’ 1847.
- ‘An Account of Sir Charles Bell's Discoveries in the Nervous System,’ prefixed to the sixth edition of Bell ‘On the Hand,’ and also published separately.

In 1869 Shaw republished Sir Charles Bell's ‘New Idea of the Anatomy of the Brain’ (originally published in a limited edition in 1811) with additions, consisting mainly of selected earlier passages on the same subject written by Bell. He also wrote the articles on ‘Injuries of the Back,’ ‘Diseases of the Spine,’ and ‘Distortion’ in Timothy Holmes's ‘System of Surgery.’

== Family ==
In 1856 Shaw married Susan Turner, the widow of J. Randall; the only issue of the marriage was a son who died in infancy. She died 18 March 1891.

== Notes ==
Attribution

This article incorporates text from a publication now in the public domain: Lee, Sidney, ed. (1897). "Shaw, Alexander". Dictionary of National Biography. Vol. 51. London: Smith, Elder & Co.
