= James Tannock =

Scottish painter

Not to be confused with James Tannock Mackelvie (1824 - 1885)

James Tannock (1784–1863) was a Scottish portrait painter.

== Life ==
The son of a shoemaker, he was born in Kilmarnock. He was apprenticed to his father but became a house-painter.

A painter of portraits as a hobby, Tannock had some instruction from Alexander Nasmyth. After that he practised successfully as a portrait painter in Glasgow and Greenock, also producing miniatures. In 1810 he came to London and established himself in Newman Street, contributing some 44 portraits to the Royal Academy exhibitions between 1813 and 1841.

Tannock died in London on 6 May 1863.

== Works ==
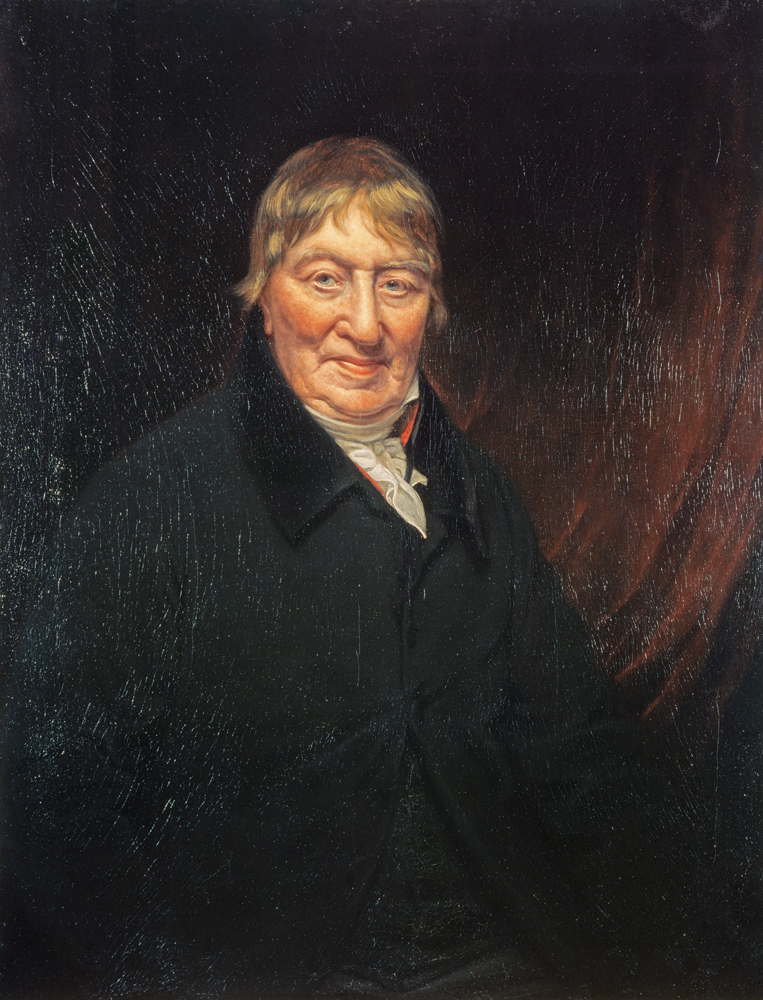
George Chalmers, 1824 portrait by James Tannock

Tannock's portraits of George Chalmers, George Joseph Bell, and Henry Bell went to the Scottish National Portrait Gallery.

== Family ==
His younger brother, William Tannock, also practised as a portrait-painter, and exhibited works between 1820 and 1830, including of Reverend George Smith.
