= Charles Shaw (British Army officer) =

Sir Charles Shaw
- Born: 6 August 1794; Ayr, Scotland
- Died: 22 February 1871 (aged 76) Bad Homberg-vor-der-Hohe, Germany
- Allegiance: United Kingdom
- Branch: British Army (1813–1844); Portugal: Liberating Army (1831–1835); Spain: British Auxiliary Legion (1835–1836)
- Rank: Half-pay Lieutenant (British Regular Army); Captain-Commandant (British Volunteers); Lieutenant-Colonel (Portugal); Brigadier-General (Spain)
- Commands: Leith Shapshooters (Britain); Scotch Fusiliers (Portugal); Scotch Brigade, British Auxiliary Legion (Spain); Irish Brigade, British Auxiliary Legion (Spain); Manchester and Bolton Police Forces (1839 – 1842)
- Conflicts: Napoleonic Wars; Portuguese Liberal Wars; First Carlist War
- Awards: Knight of the Military Order of the Tower and Sword (Portugal) (1834); Knight of the Royal Military Order of San Fernando (Spain) (1836); Knight Bachelor (UK) (1838)
- Other work: Chief Commissioner, Manchester Borough Police

Brigadier-General Sir Charles Shaw (6 August 1794 – 22 February 1871) was a Scottish soldier and liberal, who served in the British Army and in British volunteer forces on the constitutional side in civil wars in Portugal and Spain. He was later a pioneering police commissioner.

== Early years ==
Charles Shaw was born in 1794 in Ayr, Scotland, the third son of county clerk Charles Shaw and Barbara Wright. Alexander Shaw and John Shaw the surgeons, and Patrick Shaw the legal writer, were his brothers. He was educated at Aberdeen and Edinburgh universities, destined for the law, but chose a military career instead.

== Military career ==
=== British Army ===
Shaw was commissioned into the 52nd (Oxfordshire) Light Infantry as an ensign by purchase in 1813. He joined the 2nd Battalion, a training cadre supplying drafts to the 1st Battalion serving in the Peninsular War. In December 1813 the 2/52nd (only 196 strong) embarked in Sir Thomas Graham's expedition to the Low Countries. Shaw saw action at the capture of the village of Merxem in deep snow on 31 January 1814, but the weak 2/52nd was an ineffective combat unit and was left out of Graham's attack on Bergen-op-Zoom, being employed at the siege of Antwerp and subsequently on garrison duty. For the 1815 campaign the 2/52nd was drafted into the newly arrived 1/52nd. On 17 June, as a junior lieutenant (promoted December 1813) Shaw was sent to Brussels in charge of the baggage. Rushing back, he reached Waterloo village on the morning of 18 June, but to his chagrin was ordered to return to his duty and so missed the Battle of Waterloo in which the 52nd bore a distinguished part. Nevertheless he did receive the Waterloo Medal. He served in the Occupation of Paris and returned to the 2/52nd in England in 1816.

The 2/52nd was disbanded in 1816 and Shaw was placed on half pay. In 1817 he transferred to the 90th (Perthshire) Light Infantry. Before joining his new regiment Shaw took leave to travel on the Continent to further his military education. He enrolled as a student in the military department of the Carolinum College at Brunswick, then visited Berlin to observe the Prussian Army. He joined the 90th in March 1818, but the British Army continued to contract, and Shaw was soon on half pay again. He returned to Edinburgh University, then acquired a partnership in a wine import business in Leith. In his spare time he acted as captain-commandant of the Leith Sharpshooters, a volunteer unit.

=== Liberating Army of Portugal ===
Shaw sold his business interests to travel on the Continent in 1830. In 1831 he joined Dom Pedro, former Emperor of Brazil, who was in London raising a force to restore his daughter Queen Maria to the throne of Portugal, which had been usurped by his brother Dom Miguel (the Portuguese Liberal Wars). Under the Foreign Enlistment Act 1819 it was illegal to recruit for foreign armies on British soil, but operating from the London slums of Seven Dials and Soho, keeping one step ahead of police raids, Shaw and the other ‘Liberators’ hired several hundred ‘labourers for Brazil’. They formed a battalion of marines for Dom Pedro's British-manned fleet, and Shaw was given command of the Light Company with a captain's commission. In December 1831 they sailed to the Azores, which was Pedro's base, and after training there the ‘Liberating Army of Portugal’ landed on the mainland near Porto on 5 July 1832. Shaw with his Light Company were among the first to land and Shaw claimed to have personally fired the first shot of the campaign in a brush with a Miguelite vedette. The force occupied Porto the same afternoon but were soon closely besieged by the Miguelites.

Shaw distinguished himself in the regular sorties and assaults during the siege, and was wounded on several occasions. Dr Jebb, a former British Army surgeon serving with the Liberators, claimed to have operated on Shaw 12 times during the siege. After one attack, while a staff officer reported the heavy officer casualties, Dom Pedro suddenly asked after Shaw. On being told that he was not wounded, the Regent said, ‘I am glad of it, he seldom escapes’.

Reinforcements arrived by sea during the winter, and the Marine battalion was expanded to a regiment, with Shaw as one of the battalion commanders. He was then given command of a contingent of Scottish recruits, which he formed into the ‘Scotch Fusiliers’(not to be confused with the British Army's Royal Scots Fusiliers). After Admiral Napier's naval victory at Cape St Vincent, the Pedroites were able to use sea-lift capability to open a second front at Lisbon, and Shaw and his men later joined this force. On 29 September 1833 they rushed Óbidos, a town up the coast. By the following spring, Shaw commanded the whole British Brigade. In May 1834 he and the Scotch Fusiliers served under Napier in a bloodless siege of Ourém.

The Miguelite army capitulated soon afterwards, and Shaw marched the British Brigade to Lisbon on 1 June where he handed over command to a Portuguese officer. However, he remained in Portugal for another year, trying to get a financial settlement for his men – they were still awaiting full payment when Shaw published his memoirs in 1837. In 1835 he was awarded the knighthood of the Order of the Tower and Sword.

=== British Auxiliary Legion ===
In 1835 Shaw travelled to Glasgow with some of his veterans from Portugal to raise the 'Scotch Brigade' of the British Auxiliary Legion under General George de Lacy Evans for service in Spain during the First Carlist War. On landing in Spain, Shaw was angry to discover that he was only to rank as a colonel, and not as a brigadier-general, and that his Scotch Brigade was broken up. He commanded a smaller brigade in the relief of Bilbao, the march to Vitoria, and the action on the Heights of Arbalan (16–22 January 1836). Shaw was made governor of Vitoria and struggled to equip the hospitals during the typhus epidemic that broke out among the BAL's unfit, cold and hungry men. Shaw described ‘the hospitals choke full, four or five in a bed: discharging none except to their graves’.

In February 1836 Shaw was given command of the Irish Brigade – 'decidedly the best brigade in the Legion’, he wrote - and was finally promoted to the rank of Brigadier-General. He marched the brigade back to the coast in April, and embarked at Santander as part of the BAL's seaborne relief expedition to San Sebastian. He led the centre column during the fierce action of 5 May, when the BAL broke through three lines of Carlist besiegers, and even his enemies recognised the courage he showed. Shaw had been hit by a spent ball, and another had struck his watch. He was awarded the Spanish Order of San Fernando.

On 31 May 1836 Shaw and his brigade again took a leading part in defending the BAL's lines around the village of Alza against a fierce Carlist attack. On 11 July Shaw's brigade led a reconnaissance in force along the coast towards the French border, aiming to cut the Carlists off from the sea. While his battalions fought over a bridge, Shaw led a patrol right up to the walls of Fuenterrabia. He felt that he could have seized this last Carlist seaport by coup de main if he had been supported, but no reinforcements reached him, and the Legion withdrew. Shaw's letter to his brother describing this action was leaked to the Courier newspaper in London, which praised Shaw and denigrated the BAL's leadership. Evans accused Shaw of leaking the letter himself, with the result that Shaw resigned and returned to Britain.

Shaw was knighted by Queen Victoria in 1838.

== Police career ==
In 1839, during Chartist unrest in North West England, Shaw was appointed by the Government as the first Chief Commissioner of Police in Manchester and Bolton. He endeavoured to create a neutral force that was independent both of the mill-owners (who dominated the municipal authorities) and of the trade unionists and Chartists. In 1841 he led the hunt for the 'Ashton Murderers'. During the Anti-Corn Law Riots and Plug Plot Riots in the summer of 1842, Shaw was forced to call on military assistance. At one point he personally led a charge by a troop of dragoons against a mob of rioters. Shaw had considerable sympathy for the Chartists and the poor of Manchester, and was removed from his post when the Manchester municipal authorities took over responsibility for the Borough Police on 1 October 1842.

== Later life ==
Shaw married, in 1841, Louisa Hannah, only daughter of Major Martin Curry of the 67th Foot, and they had a son, Charles Martin Shaw. On 10 May 1844 he transferred from half-pay into the 73rd Foot in order to sell his commission and retire from the army. However, he continued to take an interest in military affairs, writing to British newspapers and politicians from the Continent, where he resided. His pet subjects included the Minie Rifle, soldiers' welfare, and coastal defence.

His articles for the Caledonian Mercury during the invasion scare of 1859 make his points by describing a mythical attack on the port of Leith, somewhat in the style of Chesney's later The Battle of Dorking or Swinton's The Defence of Duffer's Drift. In these he advocated the used of 'rifle batteries' consisting of 12-20 rifle barrels that could be operated by one or two men, using the analogy of mechanical looms that did the work of many weavers. These 'rifle batteries' seem to prefigure the later Nordenfeldt gun.

In later life, Shaw lived at Bad Homberg, Germany, where he died in February 1871. As a holder of the Waterloo Medal he was buried with military honours, his funeral attended by French and Prussian officers.

== Personality and appearance ==
During the siege of Oporto, a British resident described Shaw as ‘A fervid Liberal of the old Covenanter type ... fired by Dom Pedro's anti-absolutist crusades’. A British volunteer was amused by the Portuguese soldiers' long beards, but Shaw's ‘quite eclipsed all of them, being of enormous length, and as fiery in appearance as the tail of a comet’. No likeness of Shaw appears to have survived.
