= John Shaw (footballer, born 1886) =

English footballer

Personal information
- Full name: John Frederick Shaw
- Date of birth: 1886
- Place of birth: Sunderland, England
- Date of death: 3 June 1916 (aged 29)
- Place of death: France
- Position: Forward

Senior career*
Years	Team	Apps	(Gls)
1904–1905	Darlington		
1905–1906	Sunderland	1	(0)
1907–1908	Wallsend Park Villa		
1908–1909	Clapton Orient	19	(2)
1909–1910	Vickers		
1910–191?	Barrow		
- * Club domestic league appearances and goals

John Frederick Shaw (1886 – 3 June 1916) was an English professional footballer who played as a forward for Sunderland.

== Personal life ==
Before the First World War, Shaw emigrated to Canada. During the war, he enlisted in the Canadian Field Artillery and was deployed to the Western Front as a gunner, where he was killed in action on 3 June 1916. He is buried at Railway Dugouts Burial Ground, in West Flanders, Belgium.
