= John Shaw (naval officer) =

United States Navy officer (1773–1823)

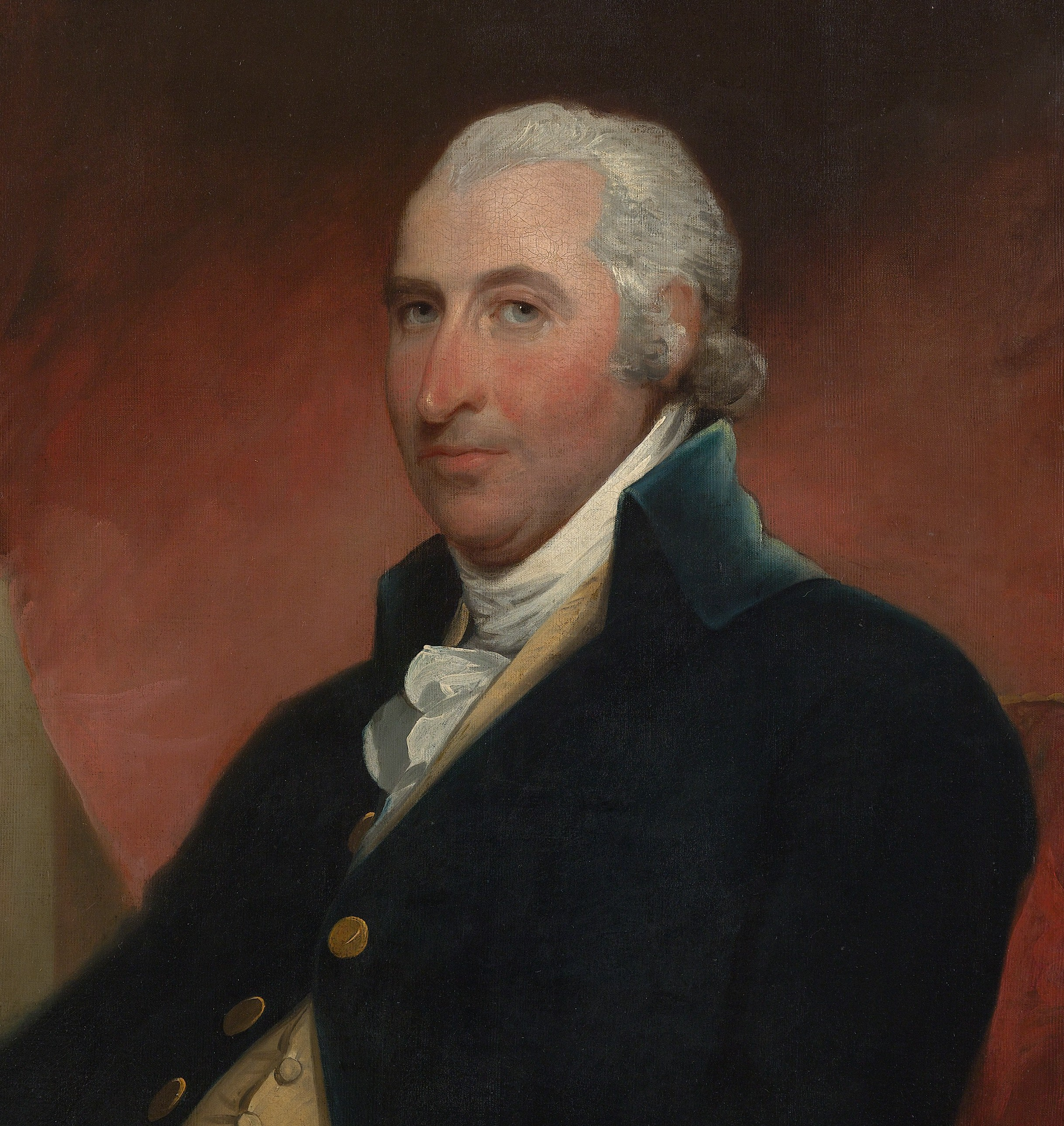
- Portrait by Gilbert Stuart, 1793
- Born: 1773; Mountmellick, Ireland
- Died: 17 Sep 1823 (aged 49–50); Philadelphia, Pennsylvania
- Occupation: Sailor
- Spouses: Elizabeth Palmer (m. 1798, died); Mary Breed (m. 1820)
- Children: Two
- Military career
- Allegiance: United States
- Branch: United States Navy
- Years: 1798–1823
- Rank: Captain
- Commands: USS Enterprise; USS George Washington; USS John Adams; USS United States; USS Independence
- Conflicts: Quasi-War; Enterprise v Flambeau; 1811 German Coast uprising; War of 1812

Captain John Shaw (1773 – 17 September 1823) was a United States Navy officer who served in the Quasi-War and War of 1812.

== Personal life ==
A third-generation Anglo-Irishman, John Shaw's father and father's father were both officers of the British Armed Forces. The family of his mother—Elizabeth Barton—were also English emigrants to Ireland. John Shaw himself was born in Mountmellick, Kingdom of Ireland in 1773. In 1790, 17-year-old Shaw and his brother left Ireland for the fledgling United States, arriving in New York City before heading to the nation's capitol of Philadelphia.

On 9 August 1798, Shaw married the Philadelphia Quaker, Elizabeth Palmer, with whom he had two surviving daughters: Elizabeth Shaw married Francis Gregory and had seven children; her younger sister Virginia married William F. Lynch and bore two children. After the death of Elizabeth, Shaw wedded Mary Breed of Charleston, Massachusetts in her hometown on 13 October 1820. Shaw died from illness in Philadelphia on 17 September 1823 at the age of 50.

== Pre-Naval work ==
Having discovered a taste for life on the ocean, Shaw sailed from the US in 1791 and worked aboard ships, making four round-trips to Guangdong through 1797. During his second trip to Qing-ruled China, Shaw was on aboard the ship Sampson when it repelled an attack by Malayan proas in the Bangka Strait; on his third voyage, he served as third officer, and by his fourth excursion to East Asia, Shaw was his ship's first officer.

Shaw was one of several-hundred members of the Macpherson's Blues irregular military; Shaw was a Blues private in the 1794 suppression of the Whiskey Rebellion, and didn't return to Philadelphia until the end of the year.

== Naval sailing ==
=== Quasi-War ===
In late 1797, Shaw was the sailing master of a brig that traveled to the West Indies and returned to the States in spring 1798, having been harassed by French Naval ships in the lead-up to the Quasi-War. Having suffered these, and with the support of Brigadier General Samuel Smith, the 25-year-old Shaw applied for a commission with the nascent United States Navy. Shaw was appointed a lieutenant on 3 August 1798, and his first assignment was USS Montezuma, patrolling the West Indies from November 1798 through October 1799 under Alexander Murray. On 20 October 1799, USS Enterprise was placed under his command.

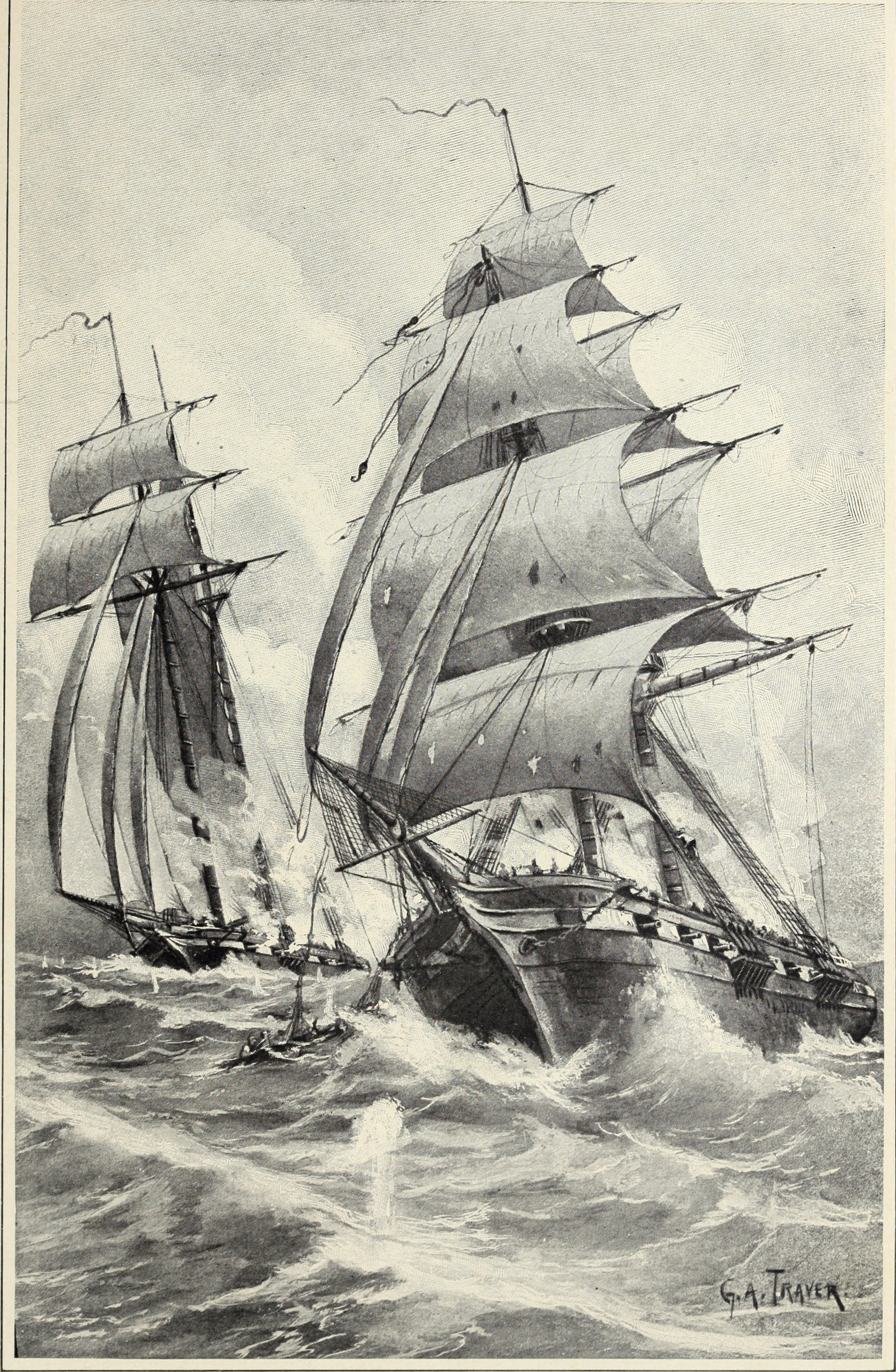
USS Enterprise (left) taking Flambeau (1902 Harper's Magazine illustration)

The schooner Victory was laden with "valuable cargo from Norfolk", and had been sailing under the French flag for five days when Shaw recaptured the ship for the United States. Two days later he recaptured the brig Androscoggin, which had been under French control for six days. In spring 1800, Lieutenant Shaw sparred with an Imperial Spanish brig, captured two French privateers (Citoyenne and the schooner Seine), and a French Naval lugger carrying a divisional general of the French Army. On his own initiative, Shaw traded the French general for two American mariners held prisoner in Puerto Rico. Mid-1800 saw Shaw's Enterprise capture: the French brig Flambeau; the French privateers l'Aigle, Cygne, and Pauline (the latter carrying the French consul to Puerto Rico); the French letter-of-marque Guadaloupéenne with the same French divisional general as had been captured that spring; and eleven further captured American ships.

Unwell, Shaw heeded his medics in autumn and requested to be relieved of command to seek treatment. After his replacement by Andrew Sterett, Shaw returned to the US aboard USS Patapsco in November 1800. Shaw's one-year tenure as Enterprise's skipper made the schooner "one of the famous vessels of the Navy"; the two together captured more French privateers than any other American ship in the West Indies. The following January, he was personally thanked for his service by US President John Adams and Secretary of War Samuel Dexter. Shaw was promised command of the captured French corvette, Berceau, but was brought up short when the Convention of 1800 ended the conflict, and Berceau was repatriated to the French First Republic. With the end of hostilities, Shaw's exceptional service commanding Enterprise kept him in the service at his then-current rank, even in the face of 70–75% reductions in Naval manning.

=== 1801–1811 ===
Taking command of USS George Washington on 4 May 1801, Shaw sailed the vessel to deliver tribute to Algiers, and repatriated Americans who had been captured by the deys there. When he returned to the US after his tour abroad, new laws reduced his monthly pay to US$20 (equivalent to $450 in 2025). Taking a furlough from the US Navy, Shaw mastered an East Indiaman for 18 months: from the US to Isle de France to Guangdong and back to the US. When he returned to the Navy in September 1804, pursuant a new 22-May law, Shaw was promoted to master commandant. The following May, Shaw was given USS John Adams to serve US interests in the First Barbary War, but he arrived after the declaration of peace; Shaw returned Adams to Washington, D.C. in December 1805.

Shaw was assigned to New Orleans in January 1806, instructed to commission a gunboat flotilla to patrol the Gulf of Mexico. Before the year's end, Shaw learned of the Burr conspiracy, and pushed for the construction of more gunboats—to stand against Burr's revolution, should it come to pass—without instruction to do so. In February 1807 at Natchez, Mississippi, Shaw mustered 61 guns, 448 US Military men, and the ketches Ætna and Vesuvius to capture the former vice president of the United States (VP). After Burr's capture, Shaw testified against him in Richmond, Virginia. In the aftermath of the Chesapeake–Leopard affair, Shaw sat on the court-martial of Commodore James Barron. On 27 August 1807, Shaw was promoted to captain, and from March 1808 to July 1810, he served at the Norfolk Naval Shipyard.

On 7 July 1810, Shaw was made commander of the New Orleans naval station—an assignment that was "proof of the Department's confidence, as he had given satisfaction when there before, and was very acceptable to the inhabitants." This assignment placed Captain Shaw under Major General James Wilkinson, the commander of all United States Armed Forces in the Louisiana Purchase since 1803. Wilkinson had been part of the Burr conspiracy before betraying the former VP, and though repeatedly acquitted, Shaw disliked serving under the man; his protestations to the Navy Department earned him naught but an order to cooperate with the senior Army officer. In January 1811, Shaw assisted in suppressing the 1811 German Coast uprising, a slave rebellion which began on plantations near New Orleans. Writing that he had "never before been witness to such general confusion and dismay", Shaw ordered 40 US Navy sailors under his command to join a force of 30 US Army regulars and two volunteer militia companies to defeat the rebels. This force never saw combat as the rebels retreated before being annihilated by another group of militiamen.

=== War of 1812 ===
When the War of 1812 broke out with the United Kingdom of Great Britain and Ireland, of the 14 gunboats vital to the defense of New Orleans, Shaw only had ten operational. Also under his command were the brigs USS Syren, USS Viper, and USS Enterprise; Shaw also purchased the commercial vessel Remittance on behalf of the Navy to become USS Louisiana, a ship in poor condition that nonetheless met muster at the Battle of New Orleans.

While combat eschewed the Gulf until the war's waning years, and Shaw worked to prepare coastal defenses (including a blockship), he also had to contend with "extensive" piracy and smuggling on his coast. Pirate ships were duplicitously flying the flags of the newly independent United Provinces of New Granada and Captaincy General of Venezuela, and illegal attacks on Spanish ships were coming from a pirate base in Louisiana's Barataria Bay. In March 1813, Shaw commanded the naval component of General Wilkinson's seizure of the Imperial Spanish city of Mobile. When he left in October 1813, Shaw was succeeded at New Orleans by his second-in-command, Daniel Patterson.

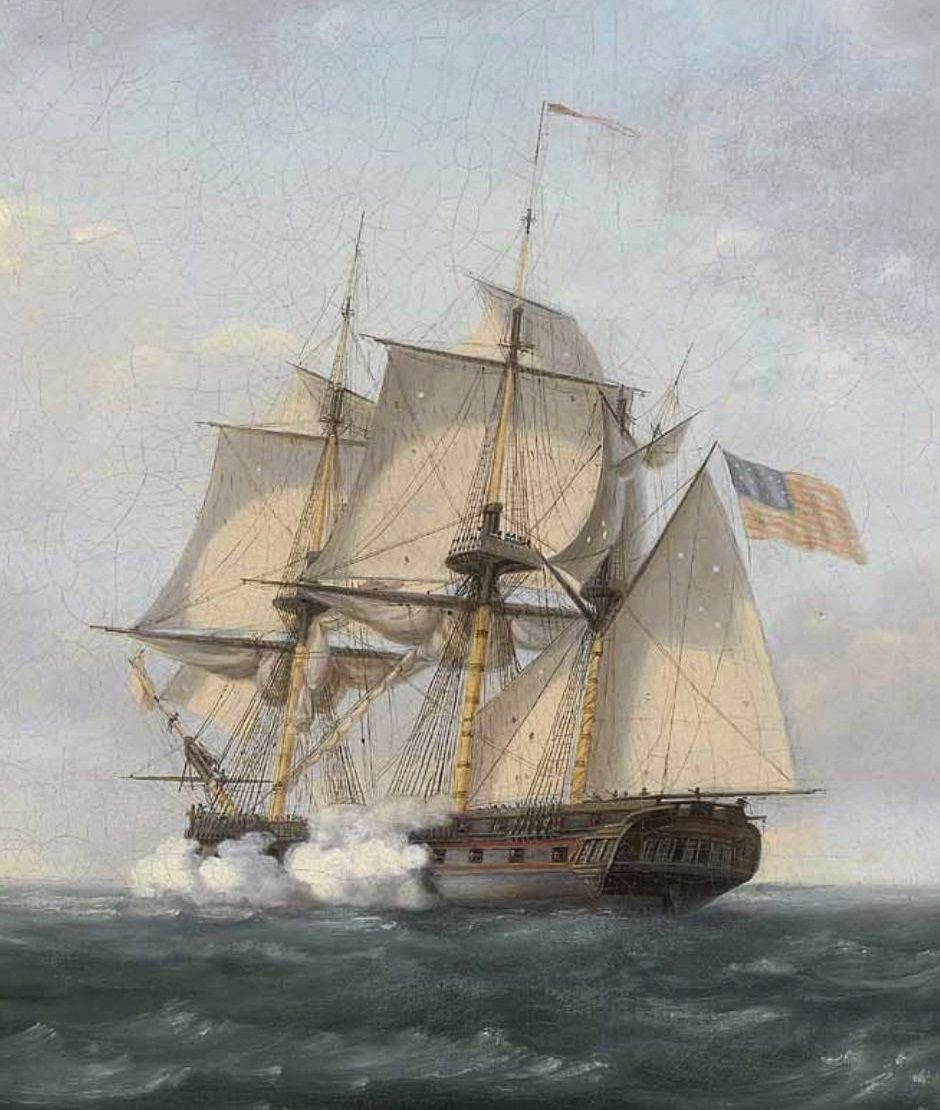
USS United States in 1812 (1813 Thomas Birch painting)

In spring 1814, Shaw was given command of a squadron of blockaded ships (USS United States, USS Macedonian, and USS Hornet) in Connecticut's Thames River; Hornet escaped and captured HMS Penguin, but Shaw's United States and Macedonian remained stuck until March 1815.

=== 1815–1823 ===
With the declaration of the Second Barbary War, Shaw captained United States and left for Algiers. When he arrived at Málaga in September 1815 with Commodore William Bainbridge, the conflict was already over. Bainbridge therefore took the bulk of US Naval forces back to the states, leaving Shaw in command of the US Naval assets in the Mediterranean: United States, USS Constellation, USS Ontario, USS Erie, and USS Java. When he was relieved by Commodore Isaac Chauncey in autumn 1816, Shaw remained in-theater until the following November when he left for the US commanding Constellation, which was in need of repair; Shaw arrived at Hampton Roads on 26 December 1817, ending his deployment after 28 months.

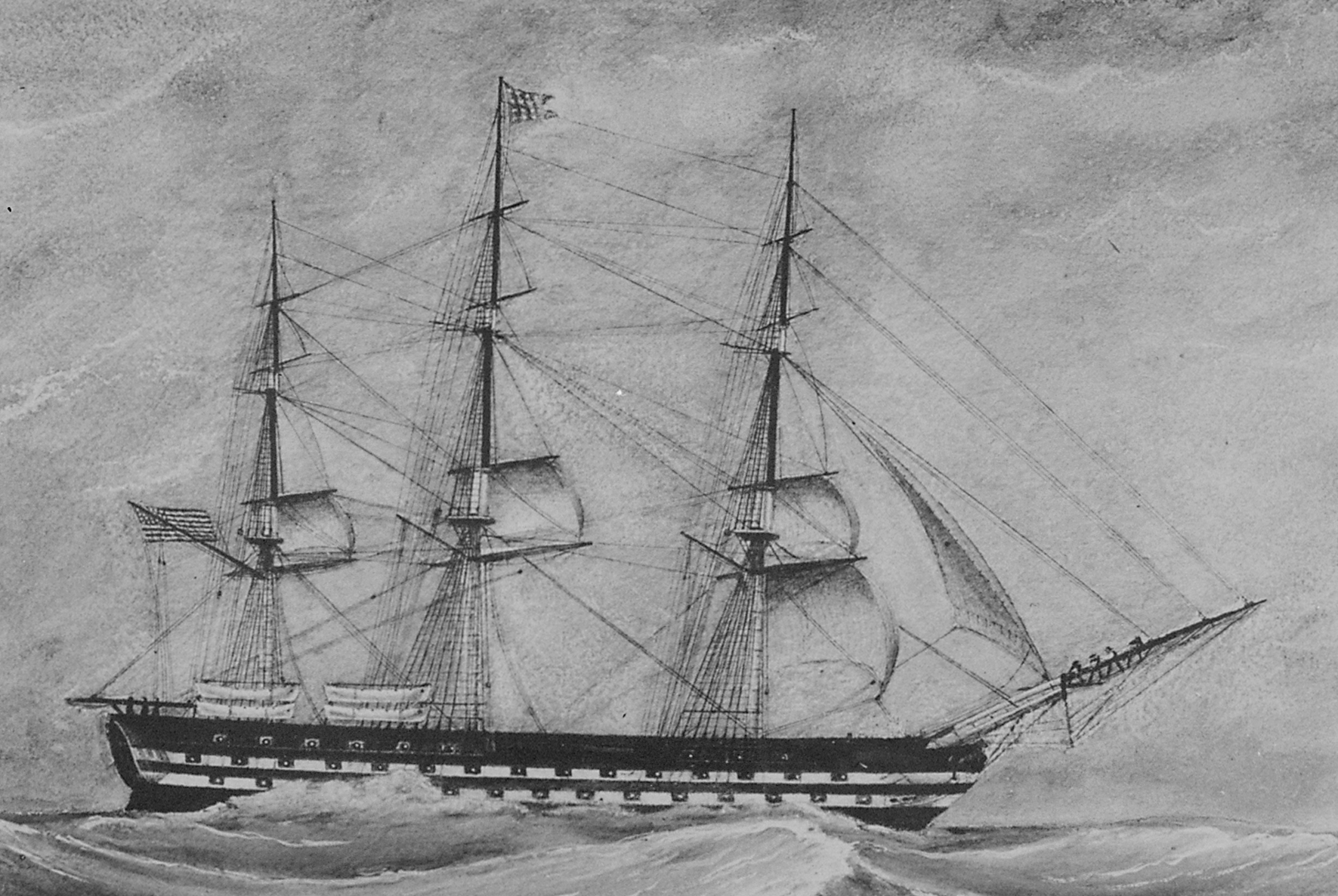
USS Independence in 1815

In April 1818, Shaw was placed in charge of the Naval Station Norfolk through the following July when he stepped down on account of poor health. Shaw took command of USS Independence on 2 October 1819, and captained that ship based out of Boston Harbor for over two years. Excepting his 20 March – 20 September suspension by court-martial for "unofficer like conduct", Shaw remained in Greater Boston until requesting transfer to a warmer climate on 26 May 1823. On 23 August, he was offered command of Charleston Navy Yard, "a station rather of honor, however, than of active duty." Shaw accepted the assignment on 26 August, but died 22 days later in Philadelphia.

=== Legacy ===
The first US Naval ship named for Shaw was USS Shaw (DD-68), commissioned on 9 April 1917 with Lieutenant Commander (LCDR) Milton S. Davis in command. The second was USS Shaw (DD-373), commissioned on 18 September 1936 with LCDR E. A. Mitchell in command.
