= Patrick Shaw (legal writer) =

Scottish lawyer and legal writer

Patrick Shaw (18 June 1796 – 12 February 1872) was a Scottish lawyer and legal writer.

== Life ==
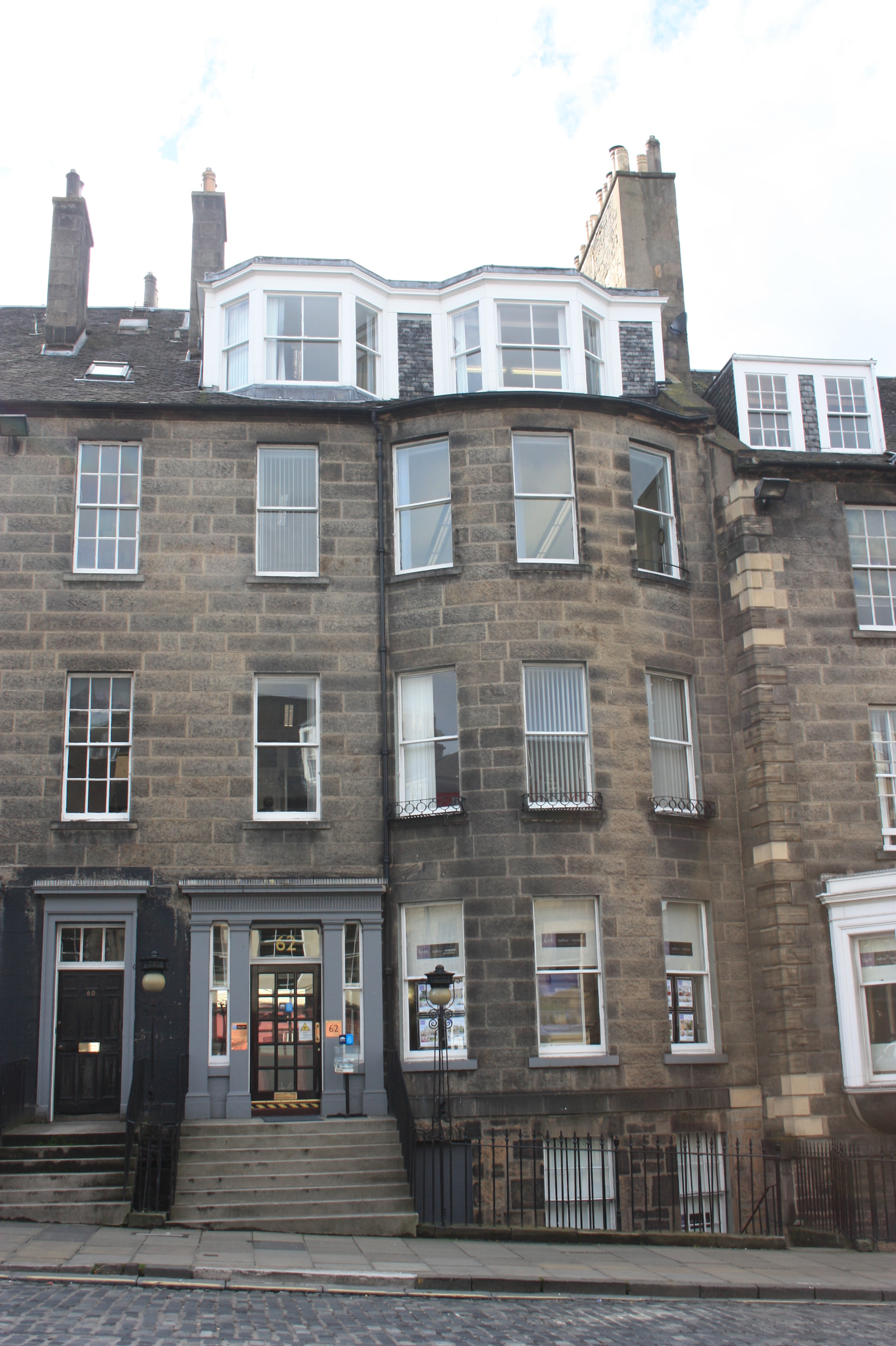
62 Frederick Street, Edinburgh

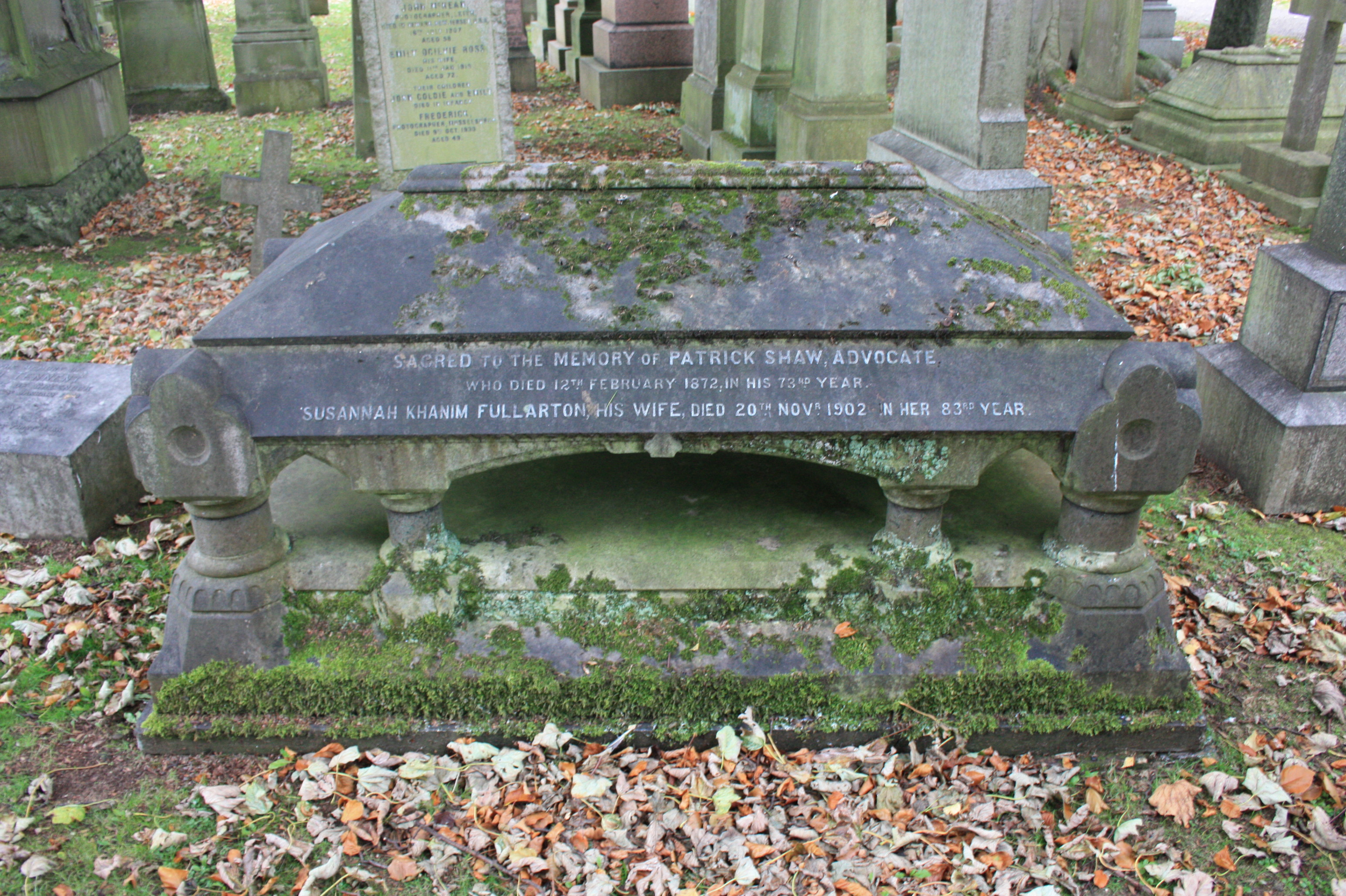
The grave of Patrick Shaw, Dean Cemetery, Edinburgh

Born at Ayr, he was the son of Charles Shaw, clerk of Ayrshire, and his wife, Barbara Wright, and grandson of Very Rev David Shaw, D.D., Moderator of the General Assembly of the Church of Scotland. Alexander Shaw, Sir Charles Shaw, and John Shaw (1792–1827) were his brothers. In boyhood, he lost his leg through an accident.

In 1819, Shaw was called to the Scottish bar. He lived at 62 Frederick Street in Edinburgh's New Town.

In 1848 he was appointed sheriff of chancery, and he held the post till 1869, when he resigned in failing health. He was then living at 40 Heriot Row.

He died at 36 Charlotte Square, Edinburgh, on 12 February 1872. He is buried in Dean Cemetery in western Edinburgh. The table form grave lies in the first northern extension set back from one of the western paths.

== Family ==
In 1860 he married Susannah Khanim Fullarton (1820-1902), fourth daughter of William Fullarton of Skeldon in Ayrshire.

== Works ==
In 1821 Shaw started with his friend James Ballantine, and later with Alexander Dunlop, a series of reports of the decisions in the court of session. In 1824 he began a similar series of reports of decisions in the House of Lords on appeal from the Scottish courts. Shaw also published supplementary digests of the decisions. His works were:

- Cases decided in the Court of Session, Edinburgh, 1821–1827, 5 vols.; new edition with notes, 1834, continued to 1838, vols. vi.–xvi., 1838–52.
- Cases decided in the House of Lords on Appeal from the Courts of Scotland, 1821–4, 2 vols., 1824–6; from 1825 to 1834, 7 vols., 1829–39; from 1835 to 1838, 3 vols., 1836–9.
- Cases decided in the Court of Teinds from 1821 to 1831, Edinburgh, 1831.
- Digests of Cases decided in the Courts of Session, Teinds, and Judiciary, and in the House of Lords from 1821 to 1833, and in the Jury Courts from 1815 to 1833, Edinburgh, 1834; from 1832 to 1837, 2 vols. 1838.
- Digest of Cases decided in the Supreme Courts of Scotland from 1800 to 1842, 2 vols. 1843–4; from 1842 to 1852, 1852; new edition, 1868–9.
- Forms of Process in the House of Lords, Court of Session, Privy Court, Court of Teinds, and Sheriff Court, Edinburgh, 1843, 2 vols.
- Treatise on the Law of Obligation and Contracts in Scotland, 1847.
- Principles of the Law of Scotland, in Lord Stair's Institutions, Edinburgh, 1863.

Shaw also edited the sixth edition of George Joseph Bell's Commentaries on the Laws of Scotland, Edinburgh, 1858, and the fifth edition of Bell's Principles of the Law of Scotland, Edinburgh, 1860.

== Notes ==
Attribution

This article incorporates text from a publication now in the public domain: Lee, Sidney, ed. (1897). "Shaw, Patrick". Dictionary of National Biography. Vol. 51. London: Smith, Elder & Co.
