= Johnny Shore =

Profile
- Positions: Centre, Guard

Personal information
- Born: c. 1924
- Died: March 21, 1973 (aged 48–49); London, Ontario, Canada
- Listed height: 6 ft 0 in (1.83 m)
- Listed weight: 205 lb (93 kg)

Career history
- 1949–1953: Toronto Argonauts

Awards and highlights
- Grey Cup champion (1950)

John William Shore (c. 1924 – March 21, 1973), better known as Johnny Shore, was a Canadian professional football player who played for the Toronto Argonauts. He won the Grey Cup with them in 1950. He had previously played football for the Toronto Varsity Blues at the University of Toronto.

Prior to university, Shore attended the Glebe Collegiate Institute in Ottawa before enrolling in the Royal Canadian Air Force during World War II. He withdrew from active service aged 21 in order to play for the Carleton Ravens, before transferring to the University of Toronto. He later moved to London, Ontario and died in March 1973.
