= John Shaw (photographer) =

American nature photographer (born 1944)

John Shaw (born 1945) is an American nature photographer who is well known for his instructional books. In 1997, he received the inaugural Outstanding Photographer Award from North American Nature Photography Association (NANPA). In 2002, Nikon featured him as "Legend Behind the Lens".
