= John Shaw (Kent cricketer) =

English cricketer

John Monson Shaw (1 October 1832 – 4 September 1912) was an English amateur cricketer who played in three first-class cricket matches for Kent County Cricket Club in the 1860s.

Shaw was born at Cuxton near Rochester in Kent in 1832. He played cricket in Kent between 1857 and 1867, particularly for the Gentlemen of Kent. His three first-class appearances for the county team came in 1865 and 1866. He died at Kirkley, part of Lowestoft in Suffolk, in 1912 aged 79.

== Bibliography ==
- Carlaw, Derek (2020). Kent County Cricketers, A to Z: Part One (1806–1914) (PDF). Cardiff: ACS.
