= Transocean John Shaw =

Semi-submersible drilling rig

History
- Name: Transocean John Shaw
- Owner: Transocean
- Operator: Transocean
- Port of registry: Vanuatu
- Builder: Mitsui Engineering & Shipbuilding Ltd; Chiba, Chiba, Japan
- Completed: 1982
- Identification: Call sign: 3EDT9; DNV ID: 13097; IMO number: 8752025
- Fate: Scrapped 2016

General characteristics
- Class & type: Det Norske Veritas; + 1A1, Column stabilised Unit
- Tonnage: 15,425 GT; 4,627 NT
- Length: 281 ft (86 m)
- Beam: 212 ft (65 m)
- Draught: Operating: 70 ft (21 m); Transit: 24 ft (7.3 m)
- Depth: 116 ft (35 m)
- Crew: 115

Transocean John Shaw was a semi-submersible drilling rig designed by Friede & Goldman as a self-propelled modified & enhanced pacesetter, built and delivered in 1982 by Mitsui Engineering & Shipbuilding Ltd. in Japan.

The Panama-convenience flagged vessel was designed and outfitted to operate in harsh environments. The rig was capable of operations at water depths up to 1,800 ft (550 m) and drilling down to approximately 25,000 ft (7,600 m) using an 18.77 in (47.7 cm), 10,000 PSI blowout preventer (BOP), and a 21 in (53 cm) outside diameter (OD) marine riser.

The rig was named after John S. Shaw, former chairman of Birmingham, Alabama-based Sonat Inc. Sonat spun off its offshore division as Sonat Offshore in 1993, and it changed its name to Transocean in 1996. In January 2016, it was decided to scrap the rig, and after a period berthed at Invergordon, Scotland, it departed, under tow, for Aliaga, Turkey on 19 April 2016.
