= John Cargyll Shaw =

American neurosurgeon

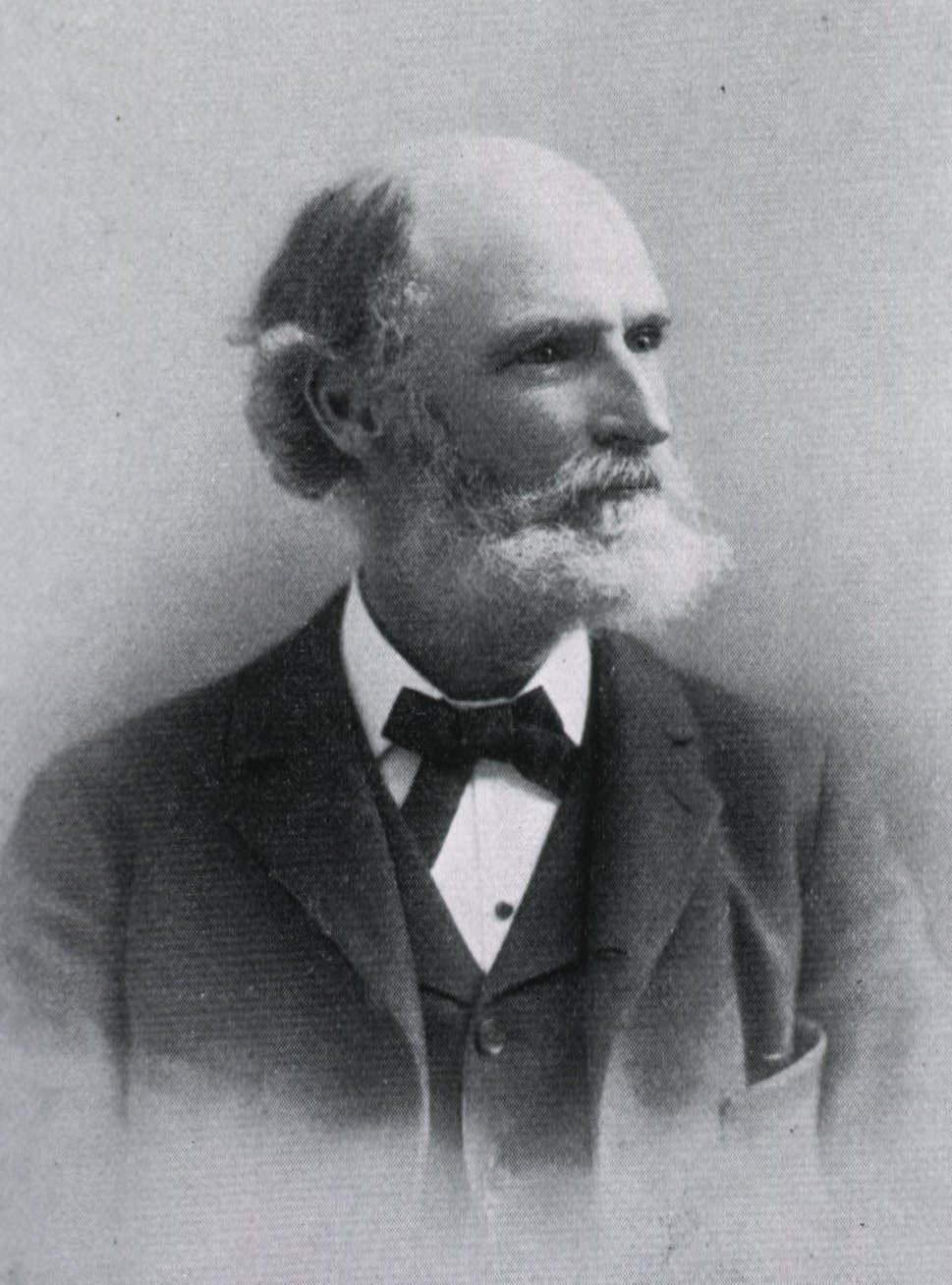
John Cargyll Shaw

John Cargyll Shaw (September 25, 1845, in St. Ann's Bay – January 23, 1900, in Brooklyn) was an American psychiatrist and neurologist.

He was the son of John Shaw and Christine née Drew. He received his first education from his mother and later attended a boarding school at Walton, Jamaica. At the age of 17 he went to New York and was employed in the drug house on Pine Street. He graduated from the College of Physicians and Surgeons in 1874.

During his career, he held positions of neurologist to the Brooklyn Eye and Ear Hospital and consulting neurologist to St. Catherine's, St. John's, Brooklyn, Kings County, Long Island College and Hudson River State Hospital. He was president of the New York Neurological Society twice.

He was among the first to advocate and apply non-restraint in the insane hospitals of the United States.

== Selected writings ==
- The physiological action of hyoscyamine. Journal of nervous and mental disease, vol. ix. Nos. 1 and 2, 1882.
- "The Practicability and Value of Non-restraint in Treating the Insane: A Paper Read at Cleveland, Ohio, July 1, 1880, Before the Conference of Charities". Tolman & White, Printers, 1880
- Apoplectiform, Epileptiform, and Hemiparetic Attacks in Locomotor Ataxia (1888)
- Essentials of Nervous Diseases and Insanity: Their Symptoms and Treatment (1904)

== Bibliography ==
- Onuf, B. (January 1901). "A biographical sketch of the late Dr. John C. Shaw". American Journal of Insanity. 57 (3): 564–575.
- A cyclopedia of American medical biography, comprising the lives of eminent deceased physicians and surgeons from 1610 to 1910. 1912. p. 364–365.
