= George Joseph Bell =

Scottish advocate and legal scholar (1770–1843)

George Joseph Bell FRSE
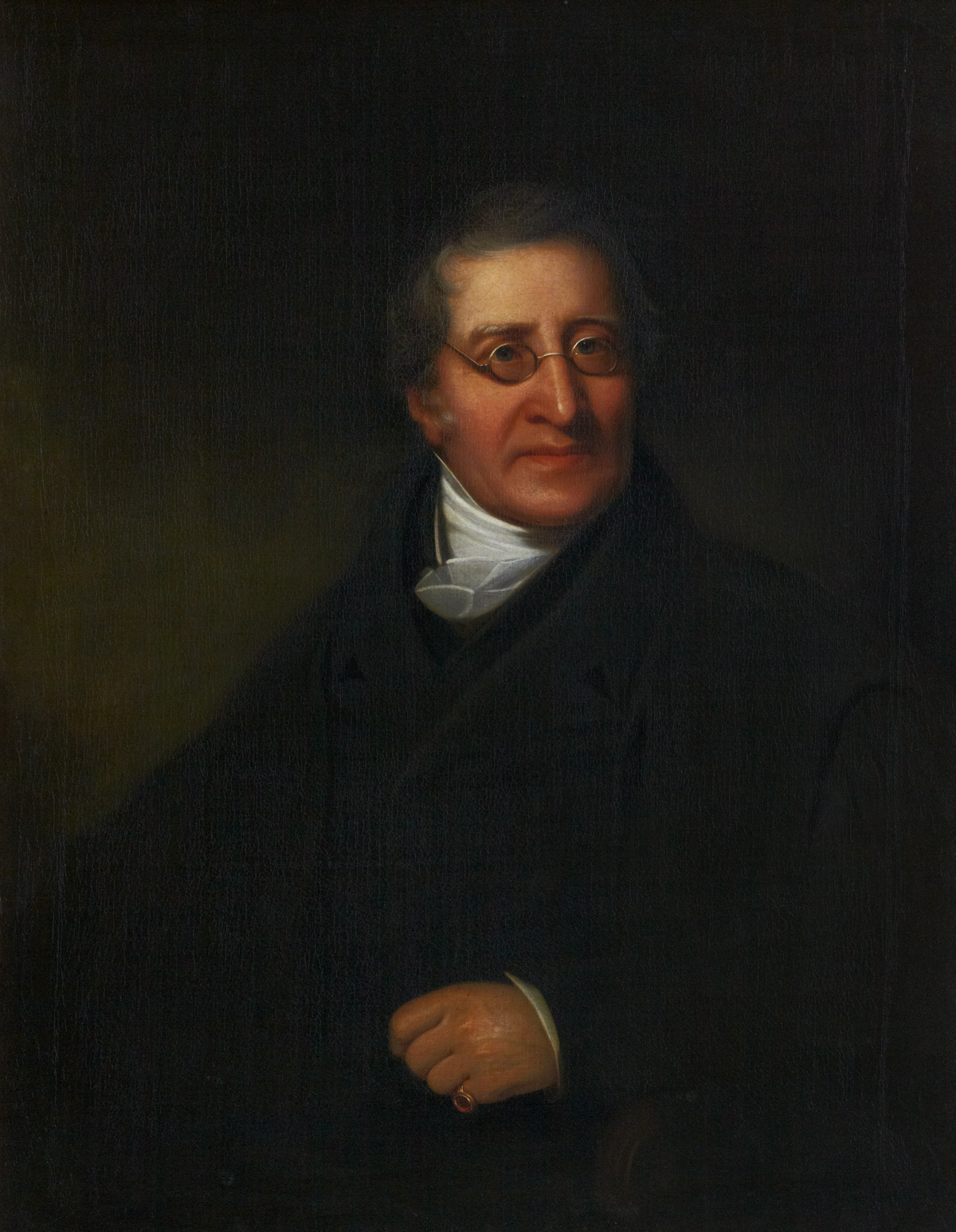
- George Joseph Bell, portrait by James Tannock
- Born: 26 March 1770; Fountainbridge, Edinburgh
- Died: 23 September 1843 (aged 73)
- Occupation: Professor of Scots Law

George Joseph Bell FRSE (26 March 1770 – 23 September 1843) was a Scottish advocate and legal scholar. From 1822 to 1843 he was Professor of Scots Law at the University of Edinburgh. He was succeeded by John Shank More.

== Early life ==
George Bell was born in Fountainbridge, Edinburgh, a son of the Reverend William Bell (d. 1779), a clergyman of the Episcopal Church of Scotland. He was the younger brother of the surgeon John Bell, and an elder brother of the surgeon Sir Charles Bell. At the age of eight he entered the Royal High School, Edinburgh. He received no university education further than attending the lectures of both A. F. Tytler and Dugald Stewart. Between 1787 and 1788 he attended lectures on Scots law by Hume, Professor of Scots Law at the University of Edinburgh, and nephew of the philosopher Hume.

== Advocate and scholar ==
Bell became a member of the Faculty of Advocates in 1791, and was one of the close friends of Francis Jeffrey. In 1804 he published a Treatise on the Law of Bankruptcy in Scotland, which he enlarged and published in 1826 as Commentaries on the Law of Scotland and on the principles of Mercantile Jurisprudence, praised by Joseph Story and James Kent.

In 1821, Bell was elected Professor of Scots Law in the University of Edinburgh; and in 1831 he was appointed to one of the principal clerkships in the supreme court. He was placed at the head of a commission in 1833 to inquire into the Scottish bankruptcy law. His smaller treatise, Principles of the Law of Scotland, became a standard text-book for law students. He wrote also Illustrations of the Principles.

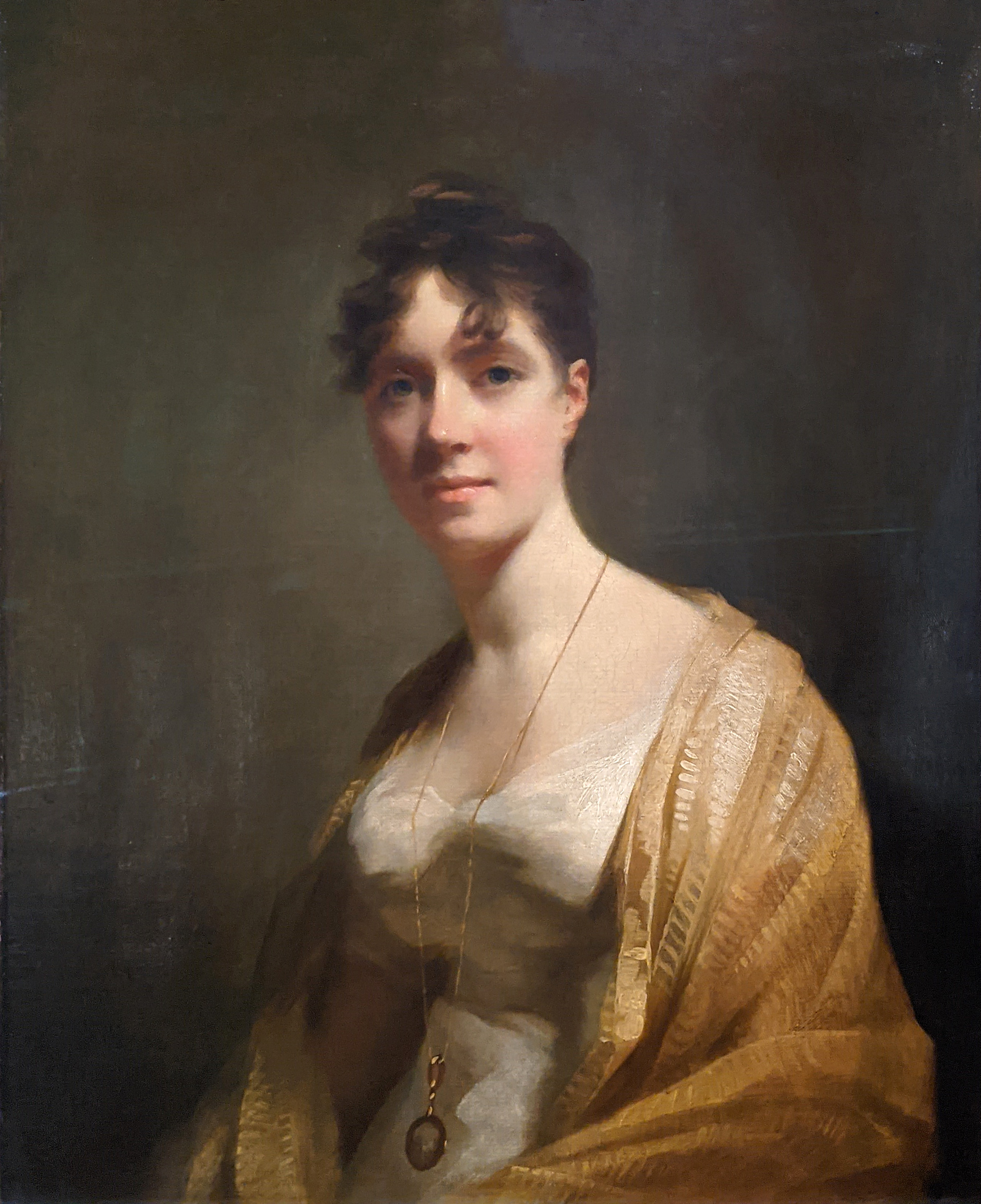
Mrs George Joseph Bell, née Barbara Shaw, painting by Henry Raeburn, circa 1806.

In 1805 Bell married Barbara Shaw, granddaughter of Very Reverend David Shaw. In 1832 they were living at 68 Queen Street in the centre of Edinburgh, since demolished. In his final years he lived at 6 Darnaway Street.

In 1831 he was appointed Principal Clerk of Session in place of Sir Walter Scott.

He is buried in St John's Episcopal Churchyard at the west end of Princes Street in Edinburgh.
