= Barbary Wars =

Wars in North Africa, 1801–1805, 1815

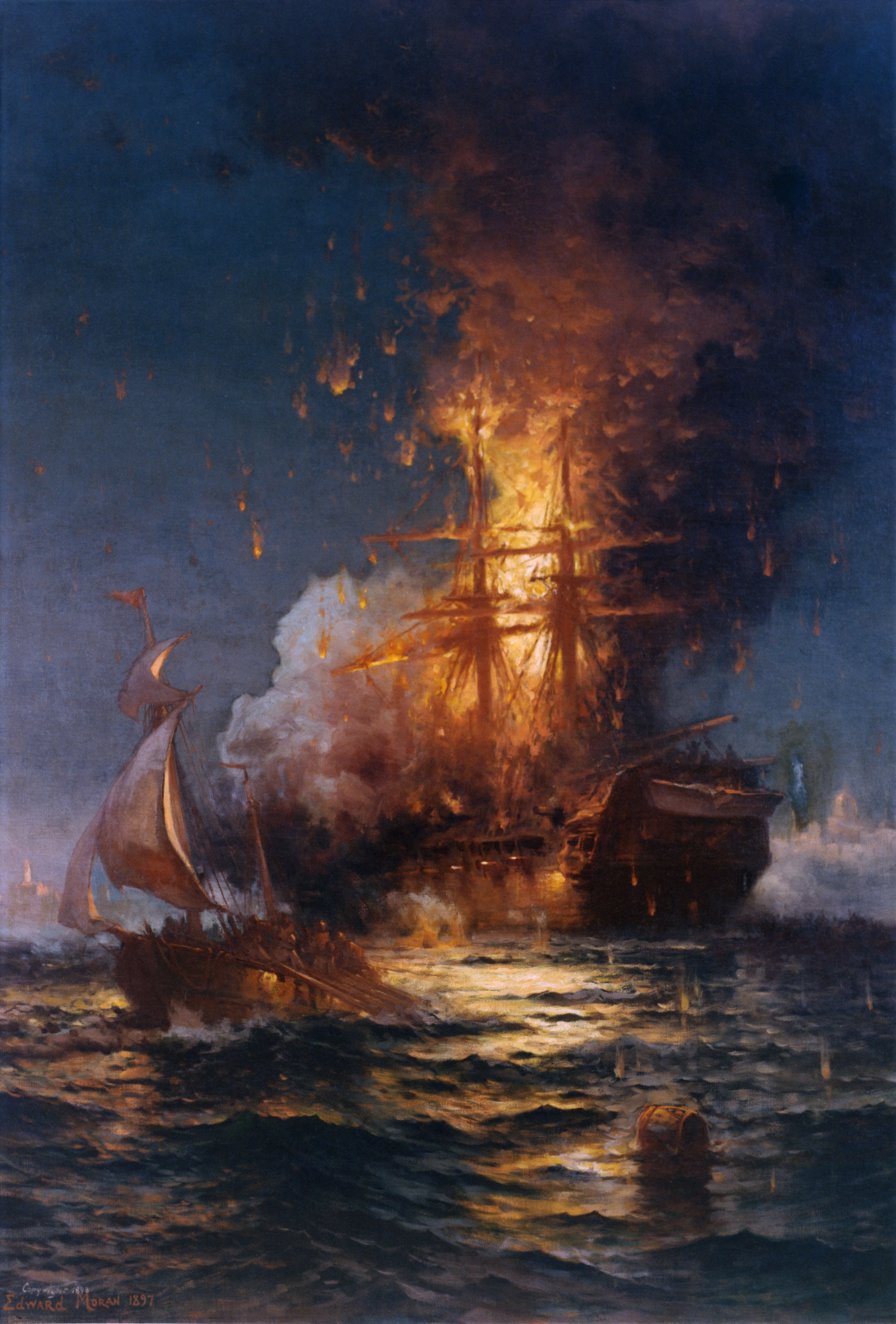
- USS Philadelphia burning at the Battle of Tripoli Harbor during the First Barbary War in 1804
Date	First Barbary War: May 10, 1801 – June 10, 1805 Second Barbary War: June 17–19, 1815
Location	Barbary Coast, North Africa (modern-day Libya, Algeria, and Morocco)

Belligerents
United States; Sweden (1800–1802); Sicily (1801–1805)	Algiers; Tripolitania; Morocco (1802–1804)

Commanders and leaders
(United States) Thomas Jefferson; (United States) James Madison; (United States) Richard Dale; (United States) Richard Morris; (United States) William Eaton; (United States) Edward Preble; (United States) William Shaler; (United States) Stephen Decatur; (Sweden) Gustav IV Adolf; (Sweden) Rudolf Cederström; Ferdinand III	Omar Agha; Raïs Hamidou †; Yusuf Karamanli; Rais Mahomet Rous; Hassan Bey; Shadi Nazmi Reis; Slimane of Morocco

The Barbary Wars were a series of two wars fought by the United States, Sweden, and the Kingdom of Sicily against the Barbary states (including Tunis, Algiers, and Tripoli) and Morocco of North Africa in the early 19th century. Sweden had been at war with the Tripolitans since 1800 and was joined by the newly independent United States. The First Barbary War extended from 10 May 1801 to 10 June 1805, with the Second Barbary War lasting only three days, ending on 19 June 1815. The Barbary Wars were the first major American wars fought entirely outside the New World, and in the Arab world.

The wars were largely a reaction to slavery by the Barbary states. Since the 16th century, North African pirates had captured ships and even raided European coastal areas across the Mediterranean Sea. Originally starting out with the goal of capturing non-Muslim slaves for the domestic North African slave trade, the focus later shifted to kidnapping for ransom. By the 19th century, pirate activity had declined, but Barbary pirates continued to demand tribute from American merchant vessels in the Mediterranean. Refusal to pay would result in the capture of American ships and goods, and often the enslavement or ransoming of crew members.

After Thomas Jefferson became president of the U.S. in March 1801, he sent a U.S. Navy fleet to the Mediterranean to combat the Barbary pirates. The fleet bombarded numerous fortified cities in present-day Libya, Tunisia, and Algeria, ultimately extracting concessions of safe conduct from the Barbary states and ending the first war.

During the War of 1812, with the encouragement of the United Kingdom, the Barbary corsairs resumed their attacks on American vessels. Following the conclusion of the War of 1812 and America's peace with Britain, James Madison, Jefferson's successor, directed military forces against the Barbary states in the Second Barbary War. Lasting only three days, the second conflict ended the need for further tribute from the United States, granted the U.S. full shipping rights in the Mediterranean Sea, and significantly reduced incidents of piracy in the region.

== Background ==
The Barbary corsairs were pirates and privateers who operated out of North Africa, based primarily in the ports of Tunis, Tripoli, and Algiers. This area was known in Europe as the Barbary Coast, in reference to the Berbers. The corsairs predation covered the Mediterranean, and extended south along West Africa's Atlantic, even to the eastern coast of Brazil, into the North Atlantic Ocean raiding the coasts of Ireland and western Britain, and going as far north as Iceland, but they primarily operated in the western Mediterranean. In addition to seizing ships, they engaged in razzias, raids on European coastal towns and villages, mainly in Italy, France, Spain, and Portugal, but also in England, Scotland, the Netherlands, Ireland, and as far away as Iceland. The main purpose of their attacks was to capture Christians that would be sold into the slave market in North Africa in order to meet the demand for slaves in the Islamic world.

The Barbary states were nominally part of the Ottoman Empire, but in practice they were operating independently and the Ottoman government in Constantinople was not involved.

=== Attacks ===
Since the 1600s, the Barbary pirates had attacked British shipping along the northern coast of Africa, holding captives for ransom or enslaving them. Ransoms were generally raised by families and local church groups, including the Roman Catholic Church. The British became familiar with captivity narratives written by Barbary pirates' prisoners and slaves.

During the American Revolutionary War, the pirates attacked American ships. On December 20, 1777, Morocco's sultan Mohammed III declared that merchant ships of the new American nation would be under the protection of the sultanate and could thus enjoy safe passage into the Mediterranean and along the coast. The Moroccan-American Treaty of Friendship stands as America's oldest unbroken friendship treaty with a foreign power. In 1787, Morocco became one of the first nations to recognize the United States.

Starting in the 1780s, realizing that American vessels were no longer under the protection of the British Royal Navy, the Barbary pirates seized American ships in the Mediterranean. In 1785, the U.S. had disbanded its Continental Navy and therefore had no seagoing military force, its government agreed in 1786 to pay tribute to stop the attacks. On March 20, 1794, at the urging of President George Washington, Congress voted to authorize the building of six heavy frigates and establish the United States Navy, in order to stop these attacks and the demands for more and more money.

The United States had signed treaties with all of the Barbary states after its independence was recognized between 1786 and 1794 to pay tribute in exchange for leaving American merchantmen alone, and by 1797, the United States had paid out $1.25 million or a fifth of the government's annual budget in tribute. These demands for tribute imposed a heavy financial drain and by 1799 the U.S. was in arrears of $140,000 to Algiers and some $150,000 to Tripoli. Many Americans resented these payments, arguing that the money would be better spent on a navy that would protect American ships from the attacks of the Barbary pirates, and in the 1800 United States presidential election, Thomas Jefferson won against incumbent second President John Adams in part by noting that the United States was "subjected to the spoliations of foreign cruisers" and was humiliated by paying "an enormous tribute to the petty tyrant of Algiers".

== History ==
=== United States Mediterranean policy ===
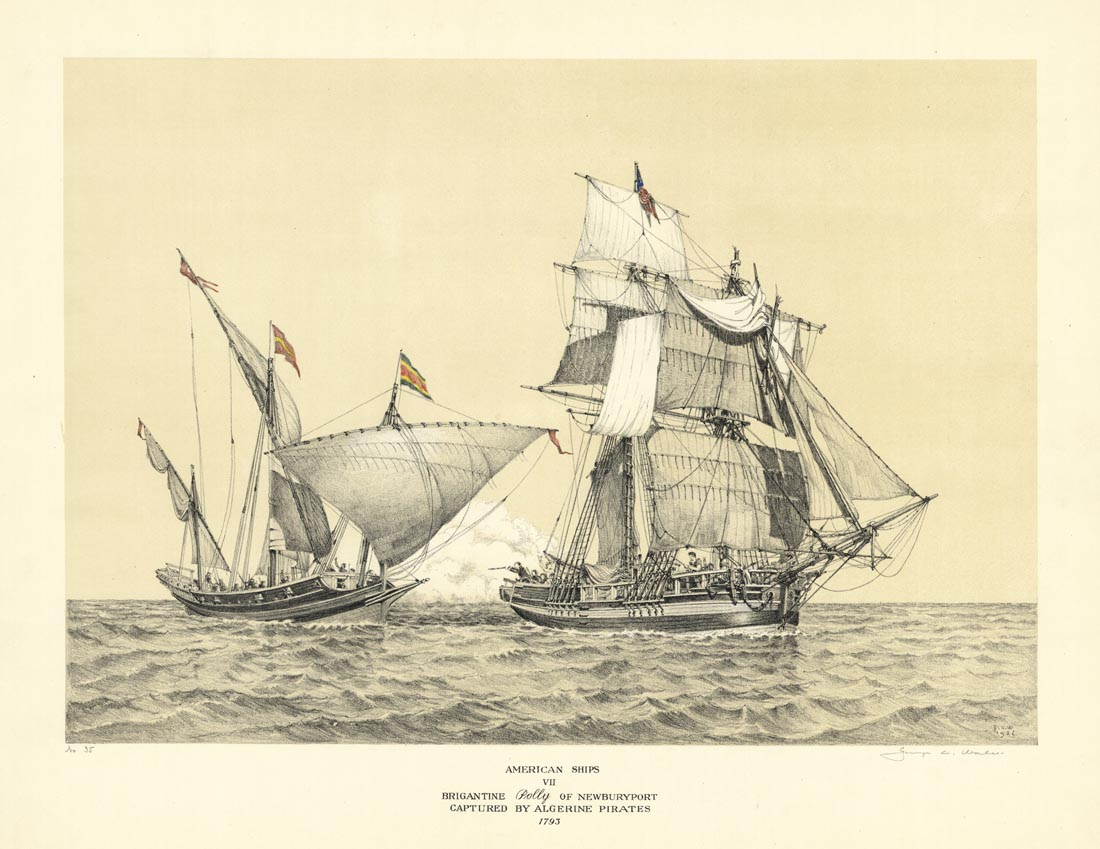
Brigantine Polly of Newburyport Captured by Algerine Pirates, 1793

After Spain concluded a peace treaty with Algiers in their last war in 1785, the Algerian corsair captains entered the waters of the Atlantic and attacked American ships, refusing to release them except for large sums of money. Two American ships, the schooner Maria, and the Dauphin were captured by Algerian pirates in July 1785 and the survivors forced into slavery, their ransom set at $60,000. A rumor that Benjamin Franklin, who was en route from France to Philadelphia about that time, had been captured by Barbary pirates, caused considerable upset in the U.S.

The establishment of the U.S. Constitution in 1789 empowered the federal government to levy taxes and maintain a military, authorities previously absent under the Articles of Confederation. The nascent nation's first naval vessels were commissioned in 1794 to counter Algerian piracy.

Thomas Jefferson, who was elected to the presidency twice, was inclined to the idea of confronting Algiers with force. He wrote in his autobiography:

I was very unwilling that we should acquiesce in the European humiliation of paying a tribute to those lawless pirates and endeavored to form an association of the powers subject to habitual depredations from them.

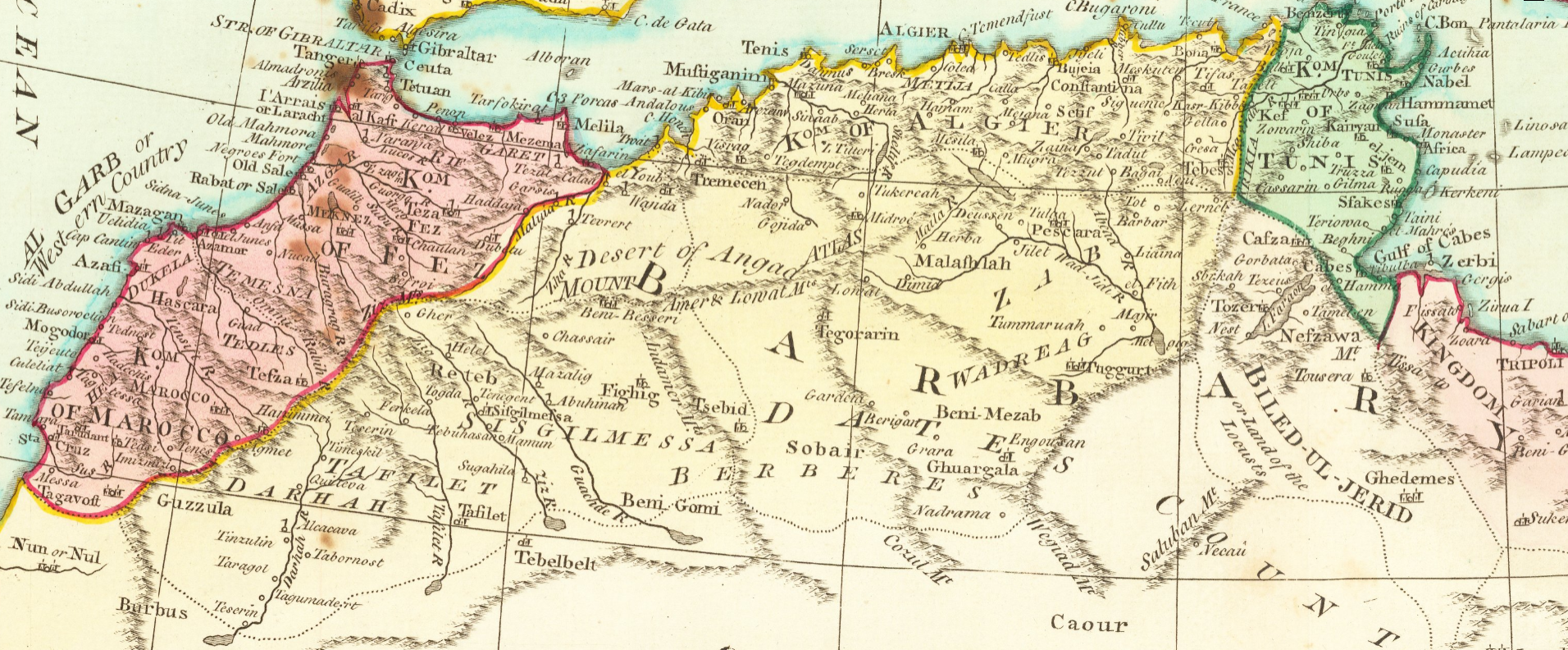
Map of Algiers during the Barbary wars, by Samuel Dunn (1794)

A proposal was made to put up a coalition of naval warships from nations at war with the Barbary states, provided that naval operations would be directed against Algerian vessels in particular, and then impose a maritime blockade on North Africa. When this proposal was presented to the concerned countries, France refused, and Spain apologized for not accepting it, because of its recent treaty with Algiers. The proposal was favored by Portugal, Malta, Naples, Venice, Denmark and Sweden. But the project failed when the U.S. Congress objected to it for fear of its high financial costs, and more Algerian ships attacked American ships because of their lack of association with Algiers by any treaty in this period. Thus, on February 1, 1791, the U.S. Congress was forced to allocate $40,000 to free American captives in Algiers. But two years later, it passed the "Naval Act of 1794" on the need to establish a defensive naval fleet, but stipulated in one of its articles that the project be stopped if an agreement was reached with Algiers.

During the presidency of George Washington (April 30, 1789 – 1797), and after America failed to form an American-European alliance against the Maghreb countries, the U.S. announced its desire to establish friendly relations with Algiers in February 1792, and reported this to the Dey Hassan III Pasha, like how Great Britain bought peace and security for its ships.

=== United States pays tribute to Algiers ===
Treaty of Peace and Amity between the United States of America and Hasan Pasha, Dey of Algiers, his dîwân, and his subjects: a scan of the original document handwritten in Osmanli, signed September 5, 1795 in Algiers

When the American government began negotiating with Algiers, the Dey asked for $2,435,000 as the price for the peace contract and the ransom of the prisoners, then reduced the amount to $642,500 and $21,000 in military equipment that is presented to Algiers every year. Reconciliation took place between the two parties, and the dey pledged to work with Tunisia and Tripoli, to also sign this treaty, and peace would be achieved for America in the entire Mediterranean basin. On September 5, 1795, American negotiator Joseph Donaldson signed a peace treaty with the dey of Algiers, with 22 articles that included an upfront payment of $642,500 in specie (silver coinage) for peace, the release of American captives, expenses, and various gifts for the dey's royal court and family. America suffered another humiliation when it sent tribute carried by the large armed frigate "USS George Washington (1798)" to Algiers; Dey Mustapha Pasha forced U.S. commodore William Bainbridge to hoist an Ottoman Algerian flag over his warship before sailing to Constantinople carrying tribute to the Ottoman sultan in 1800. As Lieutenant and consul William Eaton informed newly appointed Secretary of State John Marshall in 1800, "It is a maxim of the Barbary States, that 'The Christians who would be on good terms with them must fight well or pay well.'"

America paid to Algiers during the presidency of George Washington and his successor, John Adams (1797-1801), $1,000,000, or a fifth of the government's annual budget, in tribute.

=== First Barbary War (1801–1805) ===
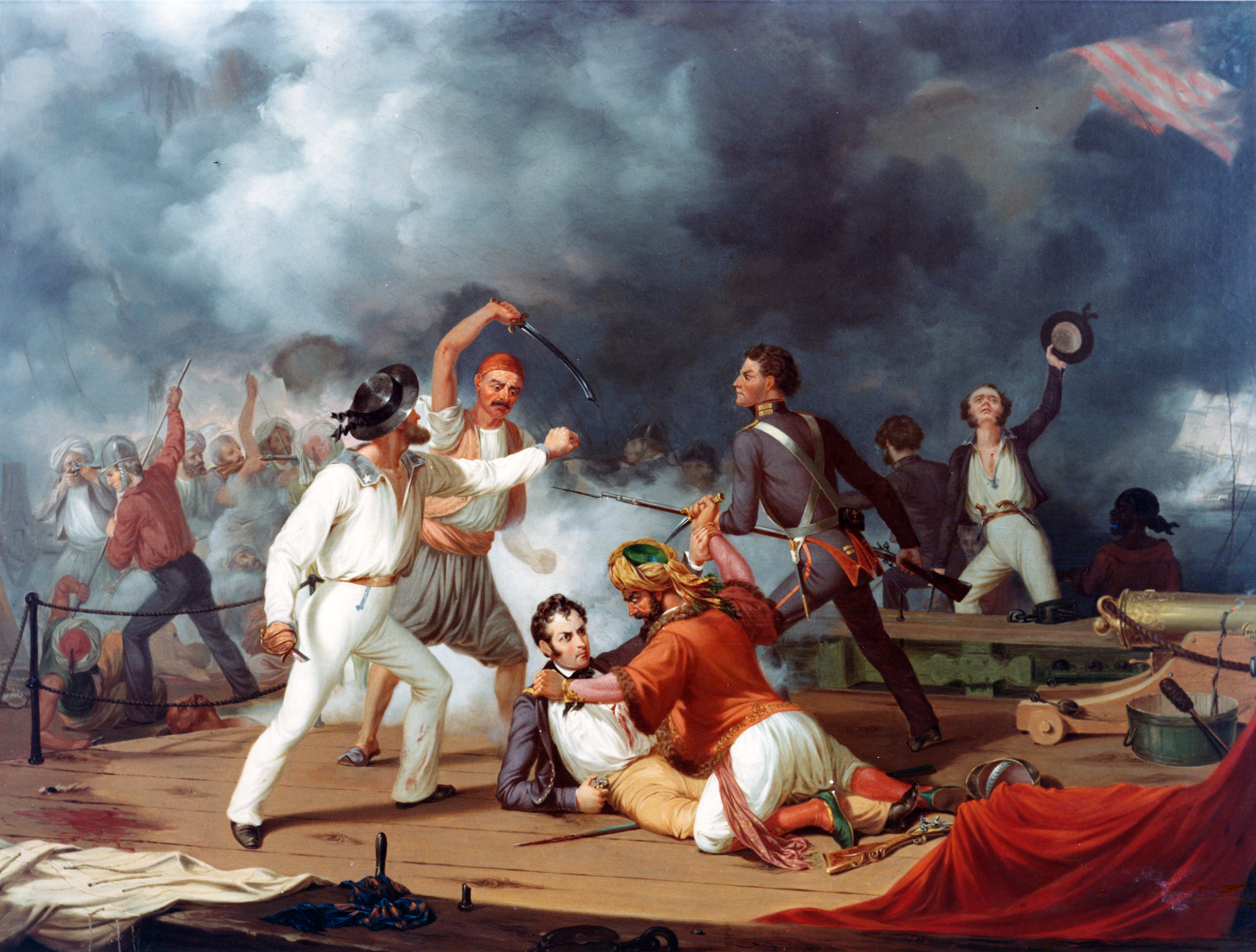
Stephen Decatur's Conflict with the Algerine at Tripoli, during the boarding of a Tripolitan gunboat on 3 August 1804

The First Barbary War (1801–1805), also known as the Tripolitian War or the Barbary Coast War, was the first of two wars fought by the alliance of the United States and several European countries against the Northwest African Muslim states known collectively as the Barbary states. These were Tripoli and Algiers, quasi-independent entities nominally belonging to the Ottoman Empire, and (briefly) the independent Sultanate of Morocco. This war began during Thomas Jefferson's term when he refused to pay an amount that greatly increased when he became president. A U.S. naval fleet was sent on May 13, 1801, under the command of Commodore Richard Dale. Other notable officers in the fleet included Stephen Decatur, assigned to the frigate USS Essex and William Bainbridge in command of Essex which was attached to Commodore Richard Dale's squadron which also included Philadelphia, President and Enterprise.

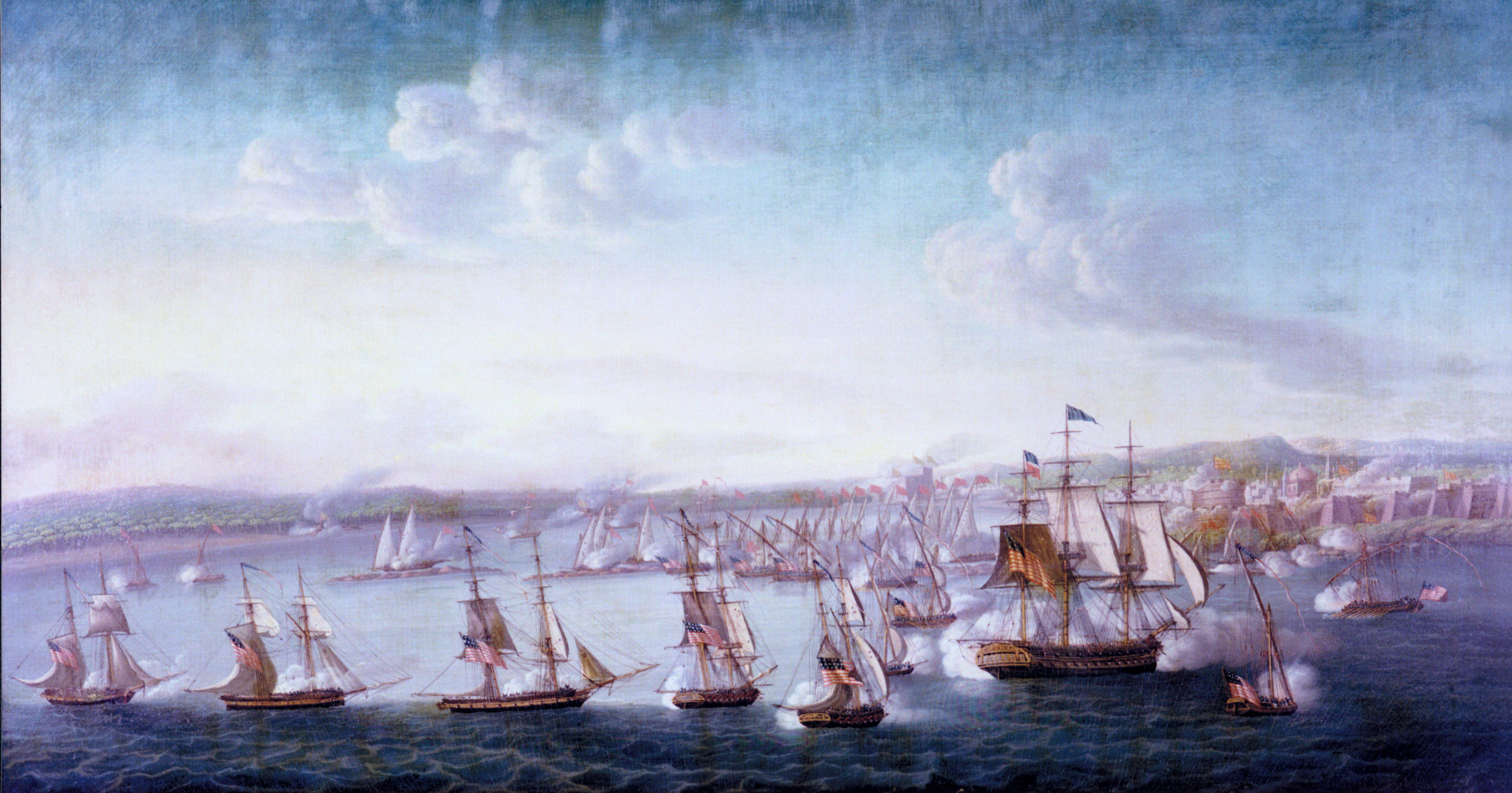
Painting depicting the bombardment of Tripoli on 3 August 1804

The ship Philadelphia was blockading Tripoli's harbor when she ran aground on an uncharted reef. Under fire from shore batteries and Tripolitan gunboats, Captain William Bainbridge tried to refloat her by casting off all of her guns and other objects that weighed her down. The ship was eventually captured and the crew was taken prisoner and enslaved. To prevent this powerful warship from being used by the Barbary pirates, the ship was later destroyed by a raiding party of American Marines and soldiers and allied sailors from the armed forces of King Ferdinand of Sicily, led by Stephen Decatur.

A treaty was reached on June 30, 1805, under which America paid Algiers $60,000 ransom for the prisoners, and agreed to continue sending gifts to the dey and replace its consul with another one, then withdrew its fleet from the Mediterranean in 1807.

=== Second Barbary war ===
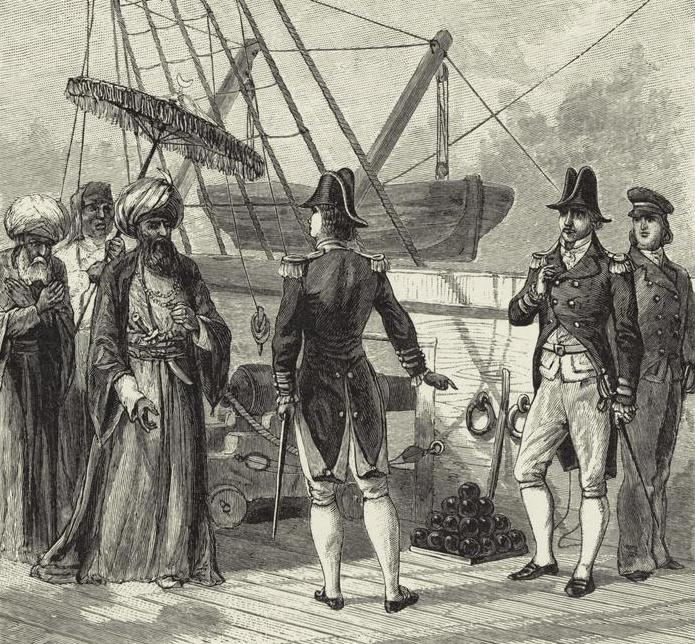
Commodore Decatur and the dey of Algiers Haji Ali Pasha

When the war broke out between America and Britain in 1812, the regent on the British throne, George IV, sent a letter to Dey Haji Ali Pasha (1809-1815) confirming to him the bonds of friendship that united the two countries and declaring his country's readiness to defend Algiers against every aggressor as long as these ties remained. By that he intended to win over Algiers to Britain against America, or at least convince Algiers to adopt a position of neutrality.

Thus, the countries of Europe and the United States of America failed to ally against the countries of the Islamic Maghreb and Algiers in particular, and the matter so remained until the Napoleonic Wars ended in 1815. James Madison recommended that Congress declare the "existence of a state of war between the United States and the Dey and Regency of Algiers." While Congress did not formally declare a state of war, they did pass legislation, enacted on March 3, 1815, that authorized the president to use the U.S. Navy, "as judged requisite by the President" to protect the "commerce and seamen" of the United States on the "Atlantic Ocean, the Mediterranean and adjoining seas." Congress also authorized the president to grant the U.S. Navy the ability to seize all vessels and goods belonging to Algiers. The legislation also authorized the president to commission privateers for the same purpose.

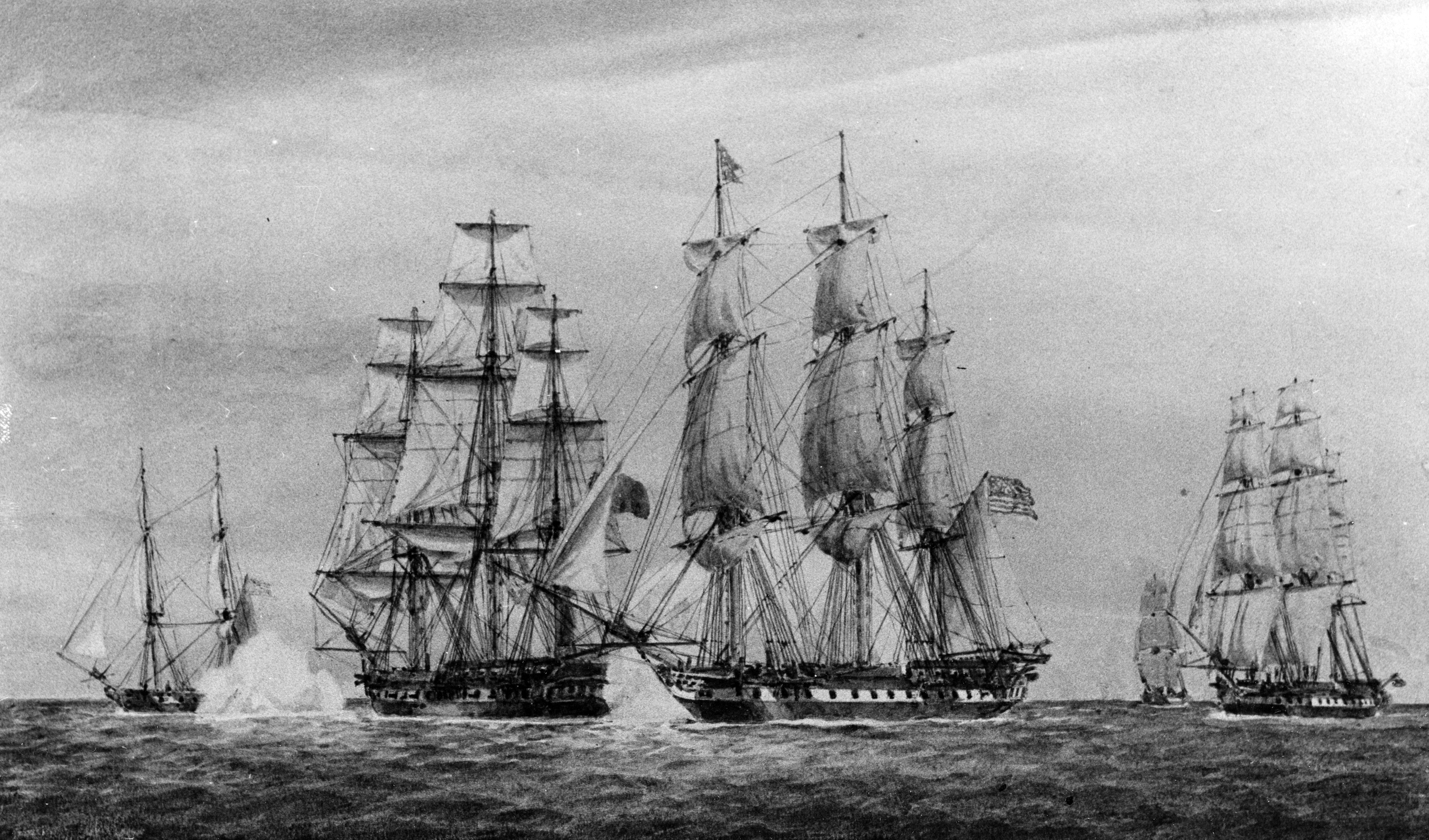
Commodore Decatur's Squadron capturing the Algerian pirate ship Mashuda, on 17 June 1815. Mashuda, flagship of the Algerian Navy

During the reign of the Dey Omar Pasha (1815-1817), American-Algerian relations worsened when the Dey began to demand an increase in the annual tribute. The Americans went to Algiers to fight under Commodore Stephen Decatur, which culminated in the Battle off Cape Gata and the death of the famous corsair captain Raïs Hamidou. A letter to the dey followed on April 12, 1815 informing him of America's decision to enter into war against him and giving him the choice between peace and war after reminding him of the horrors of war and the advantages of peace and understanding. In the year 1816, Dey Omar answered this letter and offered America the renewal of the previous treaty concluded during the reign of Hassan Pasha (1791-1798). Madison answered him on August 21 and asked him to resume negotiations. These were renewed and ended with a peace agreement in favor of America. The dey was forced to pay $10,000 in compensation and to renounce all that America had been paying him.

== Effect in United States ==
When the United States military efforts of the early 19th century were successful against the pirates, partisans of the Democratic-Republicans contrasted their presidents' refusals to buy off the pirates by paying tribute with the failure of the preceding Federalist administration to suppress the piracy. The Federalist Party had adopted the slogan, "Millions for defense, but not one cent for tribute," but had failed to end the attacks on merchant ships. From 1796 to 1797 French raiders seized some 316 merchant ships flying American colors. To counter this ongoing advent, three frigates, USS United States, USS Constitution and USS Constellation, were built to answer the call for security.

== See also ==
- Algeria–United States relations
- American-Algerian War (1785-1795)
- Libya–United States relations
- Morocco–United States relations
- Ottoman Empire–United States relations
- Tunisia–United States relations
- Turkey–United States relations

== Bibliography ==
- Allen, Gardner Weld (1905). Our Navy and the Barbary Corsairs.
  Houghton Mifflin & Co., Boston, New York & Chicago. pp. 354. E'book
- Fremont-Barnes, Gregory (2006). The Wars of the Barbary Pirates. London: Osprey.
- Harris, Gardner W. (1837). The Life and Services of Commodore William Bainbridge, United States Navy.
  :Carey Lea & Blanchard, New York. pp. 254.. E'book
- Leiner, Frederic C. (2007). The End of Barbary Terror, America's 1815 War Against the Pirates of North Africa. Oxford University Press. p. 240. ISBN 978-0-19-532540-9. Book (par view)
- Mackenzie, Alexander Slidell (1846). Life of Stephen Decatur: a commodore in the Navy of the United States. C. C. Little and J. Brown, 1846.
- Simmons, Edwin H. (2003). The United States Marines: A History. Naval Institute Press. pp. 405. ISBN 9781557508683., Book (par view)
- Tucker, Spencer (2004). Stephen Decatur: a life most bold and daring. Naval Institute Press, 2004, Annapolis, Maryland. p. 245. ISBN 1-55750-999-9. Book (par view)
  - بوعزيز, يحيى (2007). الموجز في تاريخ الجزائر - الجزء الثاني (Brief history of Algeria - Part Two) (in Arabic). الجزائر: ديوان المطبوعات الجامعية. ISBN 978-9961-0-1045-7.
