= Rashid al-Shakir Sahib al-Taba'a =

Tunisian politician (c. 1790–1837)

Shakir Sahib al-Taba'a شاكير صاحب الطابع

Prime Minister of Tunisia
- In office 1829–1837
- Monarchs: Hussein II; Mustafa I
- Preceded by: Hussein Khodja
- Succeeded by: Mustapha Saheb Ettabaa

Keeper of the Seals
- In office 1824–1835
- Succeeded by: Mustapha Saheb Ettabaa

Personal details
- Born: c. 1790 Circassia
- Died: 11 September 1837 Le Bardo, Tunisia
- Spouse: Princess Lalla Aicha

Shakir Sahib al-Taba'a (Arabic: شاكير صاحب الطابع; born c. 1790 – 11 September 1837), was a Tunisian politician of Circassian origin.

== Biography ==
=== Early career ===
From the Circassian slave trade to a mamluk of Hammuda ibn Ali, of high rank in the palace at Le Bardo, he passed into the service of the prince Hussein as Keeper of the Seals and secretary when he became a crown prince again in 1815. He accompanied him several times in the military column charged with collecting tribute from the Tunisian tribes and became his son-in-law.

=== Prime minister ===
When Hussein acceded to the throne in 1824, it was entirely natural that al-Shakir Sahib al-Taba'a became his Grand Vizier (Prime Minister) and councillor (in 1829). However, he had to deal with the powerful commander in chief of the army and son-in-law- of Mahmud Bey, general Slimane Kahia. Shakir Sahib al-Taba'a was an important supporter of the policy of autonomy from the Ottoman Empire which Hussein II attempted to institute. Likewise, during the French conquest of Algeria, he strongly encouraged the Bey not to break relations with France, but to attempt to profit from Paris and the French consul at Tunis, whose influence on the Bey grew ever greater. He restored, for a time, the finances of the state – at the price of violent exactions and extortions from the producers and exporters of olive oil.

He allied with the Makhzen family of Ben Ayed in an export enterprise which became the source of his fortune. As a result, the Djellouli family, previously empowered by an alliance with Yusuf Sahib al-Tabi found themselves in difficulty as a result of the economic crisis of 1830, fell deep in debt and were completely bankrupt ten years later; the son of Mahmoud Djellouli sought refuge in Malta for several years and while he regained his family's administrative roles he did not return to the commercial ventures which were the source of their fortune.

In 1830, Shakir Sahib al-Taba'a persuaded the Bey to respond to the Ottoman Sultan's calls for reform and to institute the first regiments of a regular army, drawn entirely from the best young men in the Turkish militia of Tunis and trained by European instructors. In January 1831, the first regiment was created, composed of several battalions of infantry, a battalion of artillery with 150 men, and a battalion of engineers with 120 men. The soldiers were dressed and armed in the European fashion and formed the original core of the modern Tunisian army, continuing in the reign of Ahmed I Bey.

After the death of Hussein II in 1835, Shakir Sahib al-Taba'a began to cultivate a strong influence on his successor and younger brother Mustafa Bey who retained him as Grand vizier, but removed him from his position as Keeper of the Seals. Shakir Sahib at-Taba'a pushed the Bey to carry out many bold but very unpopular reforms, such as general conscription from the population of large towns.

Protests eventually dissuaded the Bey from continuing these reformes, but Shakir Sahib al-Taba'a's role as minister did not end, due to his great power and influence at court. Moreover, Shakir Sahib al-Taba'a maintained a policy of rapprochement with the Ottoman government in order to counter the growing power of European merchants who were under the protection of the French and English consuls. His reforming spirit and authoritarianism had a powerful influence on the Bey's son, the future Ahmed I Bey. Once in power, he revived the reforms of Shakir Sahib al-Taba'a, especially in the realm of military affairs.

During the olive oil crisis during the winter of 1833/1834, he repressed a revolt at Kairouan in violation of the holy city's traditional right of asylum and imposed a fine of more than 500,000 rial. Another agricultural crisis of less moment arose at Bizerte in 1837, he once more repressed the revolt of a population squeezed by the weight of taxes.

=== Assassination ===
Mustafa Bey, whose suspicions were encouraged by his entourage and especially by the French consul, decided to execute him. Shakir Sahib al-Taba'a was strangled in the corridor of Le Bardo palace on 11 September 1837, as he went to meet the Bey. A telling sign is that he was assassinated during a visit to Le Bardo by the French consul and the admiral Lalande on a special mission to Tunis. Shakir Sahib al-Taba'a was almost immediately replaced by Mustapha Saheb Ettabaa, the oldest minister, although it was Mustapha Khaznadar who became the dominant personage at court.

== Legacy ==
Sahib at-Taba'a possessed large agricultural estates throughout the country, notably in the Sahel, where he supported its economy and helped to bring an end to the economic troubles in the olive oil industry. He owned 2112 olive trees at M'saken, where he built a seraglio, known as the "Seraglio of General Makroun". In addition to his ministerial duties he was qaid of Sahel (uniting the qaidats of Sousse and Monastir) from 1836 to 1837.
