= Larbi (name) =

Larbi is a given name and a surname. It may refer to:

== Given name ==
- Larbi Ahardane (born 1954), Moroccan footballer
- Mohamed Larbi Arouri (born 1983), Tunisian footballer
- Larbi Batma (1947–1997), Moroccan singer, percussionist and actor
- Larbi Belkheir (1938–2010), Algerian military officer, politician and diplomat
- Larbi Ben M'hidi (1923–1957), Algerian nationalist revolutionary
- Larbi Benbarek (1917–1992), Moroccan footballer
- Larbi Benboudaoud (born 1974), French judoka
- Larbi Ben Salah Abid (born 1953), Tunisian politician and lawyer
- Larbi Bouhali (born 1912), Algerian politician
- Larbi Bourrada (born 1988), Algerian multi-event athlete
- Larbi Chebbak (1946–2020), Moroccan footballer
- Sidi Larbi Cherkaoui (born 1976), Belgian choreographer and dancer
- Larbi Doghmi (1931–1994), Moroccan actor
- Larbi El Hadi (born 1961), Algerian footballer
- Larbi Hosni (born 1981), Algerian footballer
- Larbi Jabeur (born 1985), Tunisian footballer
- Elarbi Khattabi (born 1967), Moroccan distance runner
- Mohamed Larbi Zarrouk Khaznadar (1760–1822), Tunisian politician
- Driss Ben Hamed Charhadi (1936–1986), known as Larbi Layachi, Moroccan storyteller
- Larbi Lazhari (born 1941), Algerian gymnast
- Larbi Messari (1936–2015), Moroccan politician, diplomat and writer
- Larbi Naji (born 1990), Moroccan footballer
- Larbi Oukada (born 1946), Moroccan runner
- Larbi Sadiki, Tunisian political scientist
- Larbi Tabti (born 1993), Algerian footballer
- Larbi Tbessi (1891-1957), Algerian nationalist revolutionary
- Larbi Touati (born 1936), Tunisian footballer
- Larbi Zekkal (1934–2010), Algerian actor
- Larbi Zéroual (born 1971), Moroccan distance runner
- Ramiz Zerrouki (born 1998), full name Ramiz Larbi Zerrouki, Algerian footballer
- Mohamed Larbi Zarrouk (1822-1902), Tunisian politician
- Mohamed Larbi Zitout (born 1963), Algerian political commentator, dissident and former diplomat

== Surname ==
- Arezki Aït-Larbi (born 1955), Algerian journalist and human rights activist
- Firas Ben Larbi (born 1996), Tunisian footballer
- Agyare Koi Larbi (1949–2008), Ghanaian politician
- Amoaku Obuadabang Larbi (born 1948), Ghanaian politician
- Emmanuel Gyimah Labi (born 1950), aka Emmanuel Larbi, Ghanaian composer, conductor and academic
- John Larbi (born 1977), Swedish boxer
- Kamel Larbi, multiple people
- Koi Larbi (born 1914), Ghanaian lawyer and judge
- Mohamed Larbi (born 1987), Tunisian footballer
- Oscar Ofori Larbi (born 1966), Ghanaian politician
- Raïs Larbi (fl. 18th century), Algerian naval officer
