= Zarrouk =

Zarrouk is a surname. Notable people with the surname include:

- Dorra Zarrouk (born 1980), Tunisian actress
- Mohamed Larbi Zarrouk (1822-1902), Tunisian politician
- Néziha Zarrouk (born 1946), Tunisian politician and diplomat

== See also ==
- Dar Zarrouk, a palace in Tunis, Tunisia
