= Mohamed Larbi Zarrouk Khaznadar =

Tunisian politician and reformer

Larbi Zarrouk Khaznadar

Prime Minister of Tunisia
- In office 23 January 1815 – 29 October 1822
- Monarch: Mahmud I
- Preceded by: Youssef Saheb Ettabaa
- Succeeded by: Hussein Khodja

Personal details
- Born: c. 1760; Le Bardo, Beylik of Tunis
- Died: 29 October 1822 (aged 61–62); Tunis, Beylik of Tunis
- Children: Ahmed Zarrouk (adoptive)

Mohamed Larbi Zarrouk Khaznadar (Arabic: محمد العربي زروق خزندار; born c. 1760 in Le Bardo, died 29 October 1822 in Tunis) was the Prime Minister and Khaznadar, or minister of finance, of the Beylik of Tunis.

== Family ==
He was born to a wealthy feudal Sharifian family from Béja. The family had close ties to the beylical court: his paternal grandfather Ahmed Zarrouk was the secretary of the cheikh Youssef Bourtaghiz, the Hanafi chief mufti, and the power broker of Hussein Bey I while his maternal grandfather was Radjab Khaznadar, an influential minister. Mohamed Arbi Zarrouk was also the foster brother of the princess Amina Baya, sister of Hammuda Pasha and future wife of Mahmoud Bey. He was educated by his father who was the controller of restoration works on the Beylical palace.

== Rise to power ==
Like his father, he entered the service of Hammouda Pasha as supervisor of major works, such as the construction of the fortress at El Kef, near the Algerian border. After 1800, he accompanied Minister Youssef Saheb Ettabaa on the tours (mhalla) of pacification and tax collection in the tribal areas, as his advisor and treasurer.

=== Plot against Youssef Saheb Ettabaâ ===
In 1814, he plotted with his sister Amina Baya to encourage the princes Hussein and Mustapha to assassinate Osman Bey and his sons and to restore legitimacy in the person of their father, Mahmoud Bey. After this coup was carried out, Mohamed was frustrated at not taking Youssef Saheb Ettabaâ's place, and he temporarily assumed the position of Minister of Finance (khaznadar). Eventually however the suspicions of the new bey, maintained by Zarrouk, his wife Amina Baya and Prince Hussein, got the better of Saheb Ettabaâ. Zarrouk, helped by a powerful party eager to shed Saheb Ettabaâ's influence, organized his assassination in the Bardo Palace. He then finally took the post of principal minister of Tunisia.

=== Prime minister ===
Khaznadar then tracked down the allies of the former minister: some were imprisoned, all were dispossessed of their property, including the father of the chronicler Ibn Abi Dhiaf, former secretary of Saheb Ettabaâ.

Taking advantage of his dominant position and having cleared the court of the former strongmen of the time of Hammouda Pasha, Zarrouk enriched himself considerably. He actively participated in the olive oil and wheat trade and built one of the largest palaces in the medina of Tunis, in the rue des Juges district. He also saved the ruling family during the revolt of the Turkish militia in 1816. However, he failed to contain the European powers who were pushing for an end to the long-established practice of corsairing.

== Assassination ==
Mahmoud Bey eventually decided to make Zarrouk take sole responsibility for the assassination of Saheb Ettabaâ: Zarrouk was eliminated in the same way, in front of one of the doors of the Bardo palace. He was strangled by the bey's Mameluk guards October 29, 1822, without his nephews intervening, and was buried the same day in the Jellaz Cemetery. His young son Mohamed, father of Mohamed Larbi Zarrouk, was imprisoned for several months and his sister Amina Beya died two months later. Ahmed Zarrouk, a young Circassian Mamluk whom Zarrouk had adopted and raised, was taken to the seraglio of Hussein Bey. He would later make a career in Sadok Bey's army and later as Minister of War.

Hussein Khodja, head of the Bey's Mamluk guard, succeeded Zarrouk as principal minister.
