= Mustapha Saheb Ettabaa =

Tunisian politician and reformer

Prime Minister of Tunisia
- In office 1837–1855
- Monarch: Ahmad I
- Preceded by: Shakir Saheb Ettabaa
- Succeeded by: Mustapha Khaznadar

Personal details
- Born: c. 1784 Kingdom of Georgia
- Died: 10 May 1861 (aged 76–77) Le Bardo, Beylik of Tunis
- Spouse: Princess Lalla Mahbouba (1829–d. 1852)

Mustapha Saheb Ettabaa (Arabic: مصطفى صاحب الطابع; born 1784 and died 10 May 1861), was a Tunisian politician and a mamluk of Georgian origin who served as a minister in the Beylik of Tunis.

== Early life ==
To increase his prestige at the court of Hammouda Pasha the Sfaxi shipowner and tax farmer Mahmoud Djellouli had his agent acquire a young slave in the market in Istanbul who would be capable of occupying a privileged place within the court. Djellouli then offered him to the bey.

At the Bardo Palace, Mustapha followed the normal Mamluk training course. On the sudden death of Hammouda Pasha, Mustapha was freed according to the customs of the Beylical court but, after leaving the Bardo, the influential minister Youssef Saheb Ettabaa attached him to the service of the new ruler Osman Bey, who was quickly assassinated.

== Political career ==
Mustapha really entered politics under the reign of Hussein Bey whom he served as Keeper of the Seals (Saheb Ettabaa) (he had no family link with Youssef Saheb Ettabaâ or Chakir Saheb Ettabaa). He held this position between 1835 and 1837 . He leads with the French general Bertrand Clauzel delicate negotiations on the claims of Tunisian princes of the beyliks of Constantine and Oran. His prestige gradually increases, which allows him to enter the Beylical family through his marriage to Princess Mahbouba. By virtue of his position, he was able to help the Djellouli family when they went bankrupt in 1840. He then became a principal minister whose influence was significant; he headed the cabinet when Ahmed I er Bey visited France in 1846, then during Sadok Bey's visit to Algiers in 1860. There he greeted Napoleon III and gave him a copy of the codes and of the newly adopted constitution, agreed by the Grand Council of which he was a member.

== Family life ==
He first married Mahbouba, daughter of Moustapha Bey, with whom he had two children: Chedly and Rachid. After the death of his wife, he married Gulfidan, a Circassian odalisque with whom he had a third child, Ahmed. His three sons all bore the name of Saheb Ettabaâ which was to become their family name. His funeral took place in accordance with the customs of the Beylical family and he was buried in Tourbet el Bey.

== Bibliography ==
- Mustapha Saheb Ettabaa: un haut dignitaire beylical dans la Tunisie du XIXe siècle, Nadia Sebaï, éditions cartaginoiseries, 2007
