= Ali III bin Mohamed =

Ali Ben Mohamed

22nd Dey of Algiers
- Reign: 7 november 1808 – 21 mars 1809
- Predecessor: Ahmed II
- Successor: Ali IV
- Born: Ali ben Mohamed; Regency of Algiers
- Died: 21 March 1809; Algiers
Names
- Dey Ali ben Mohamed
Regnal name
- Ali III Dey
- Father: Muhammad
- Religion: Islam

Ali Ben Mohamed or Ali III Ar Rasul, was a short lived dey of Algiers reigning for a few months from 1808 to 1809.

== Biography ==
The son of a certain Muhammad. He had some influence in the troops, but in which exactly it is not known for sure. On November 7, 1808, he conspired against Dei Ahmad II, after whose overthrow he seized power. However, he did not have strong support and on March 21, 1809, he was overthrown after a reign of 4 months. Ali IV was elected as the next dey on the same day.

== See also ==
- Regency of Algiers
- Dey d'Alger
- List of governors and rulers of the Regency of Algiers

== Bibliography ==
- Kaddache, Mahfoud (2011) [1982]. L'Algérie des Algériens. Alger: EDIF2000. p. 786. ISBN 978-9961-9-6621-1.
