= Hussein Khodja =

Tunisian politician and reformer

Prime Minister of Tunisia
- In office 1822–1829
- Monarchs: Mahmud I Hussein II
- Preceded by: Larbi Zarrouk Khaznadar
- Succeeded by: Shakir Saheb Ettabaa

Personal details
- Born: c. 1780 Favignana, Kingdom of Sicily
- Died: 1857 (aged 76–77) Tunis, Beylik of Tunis
- Spouse: Princess Lalla Kebira

Hussein Khodja (Arabic: حسين خوجة; born Giuseppe Certa in Favignana and died 1857 in Tunis) was a Tunisian politician and a mamluk of Italian origin who rose to become Prime Minister of Tunisia.

== Early life ==
Captured on the island of Favignana by Tunisian corsairs, he was offered to the minister Youssef Saheb Ettabaa, brought up in the minister's seraglio and raised as a Muslim. He acquired a solid training under the renowned teachers who served his master, whose lieutenant he eventually became. The day after Youssef Saheb Ettabaa’s fall in 1815, he entered the service of crown prince Hussein, (the future Hussein Bey) as Bach-Mamluk, or head of his private mamluk guard. Hussein extended his favour by also granting him his daughter in marriage.

== Prime minister ==
Hussein's father Mahmoud Bey then chose him as principal minister in 1822 after the execution of Mohamed Arbi Zarrouk Khaznadar, and he was confirmed in his post by Hussein when he succeeded his father in 1824. He then appeared as a perfect courtier but a poor administrator, allied to the rich tax farmer of the State, Mahmoud Djellouli. Despite this, he remained an intellectual and spent a lot to stock his rich library which subsequently enriched that of the Zaytuna Mosque. The bey also entrusted him with the management of his personal property and the export operations in partnership with Djellouli but, during the drought which affected the country, he found himself at the mercy of the many European creditors who had bought him large quantities of oil in advance, through a very risky commercial process. He was removed from power in 1829 and replaced by the ambitious Keeper of the Seals, Rashid al-Shakir Sahib al-Taba'a, whose influence became predominant. The bey confiscated Khodja's property and placed him under house arrest in one of the apartments of the Bardo Palace. He then remained without official function at court until his death in 1857.
