= Dar Zarrouk =

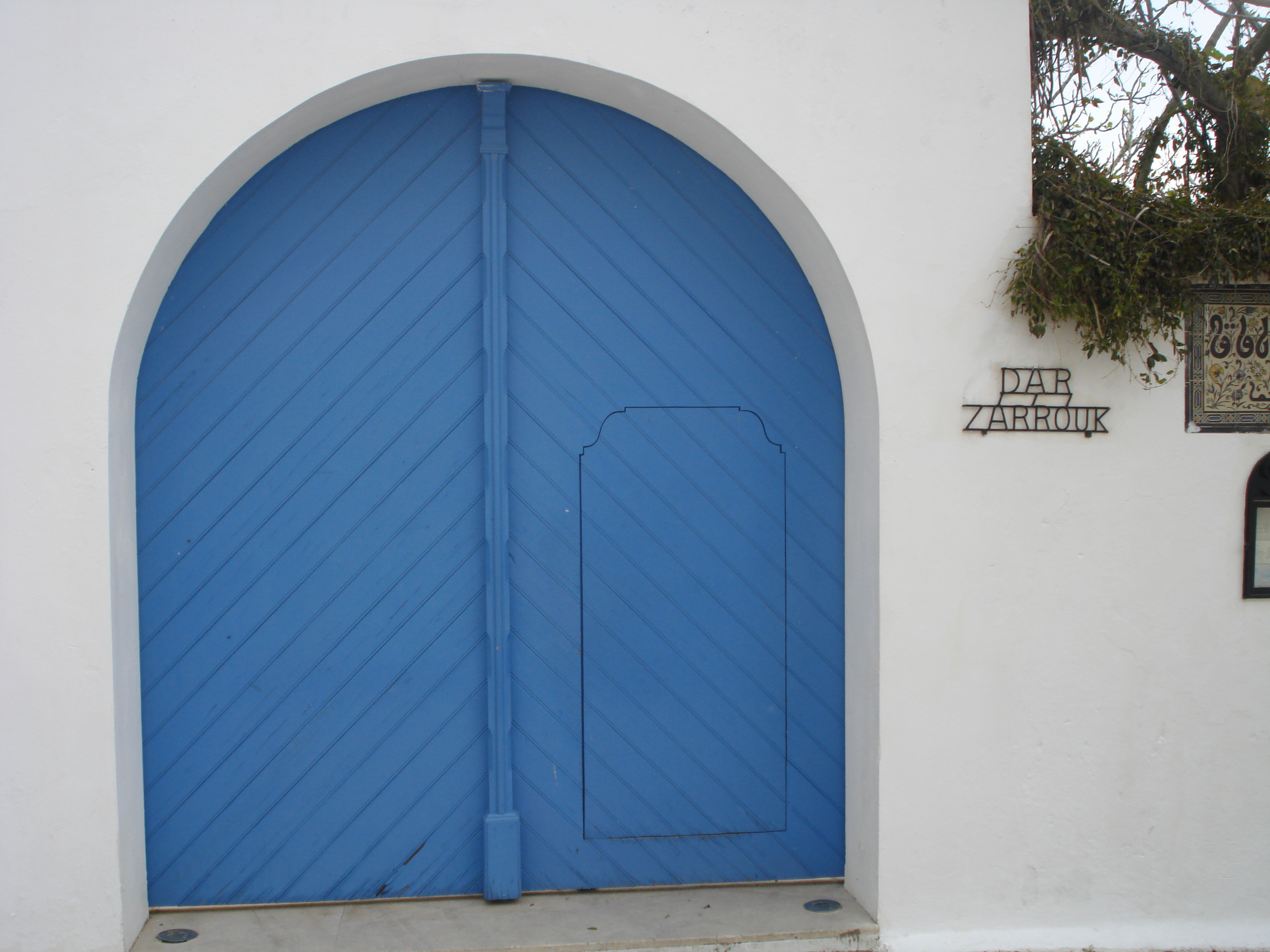
Door of the Dar Zarrouk restaurant, rue Hédi-Zarouk, in Sidi Bou Said

Dar Zarrouk is one of the palaces of the old town of Tunis. It is one of the largest historical palaces in Tunis.

== Localization ==
The palace is located on the street of Judges near the palace of Khurasanid dynasty's princes.

== History ==
Dar Zarrouk is an aristocratic house that belongs to the Zarrouk family, we can mention for example Abou Abdallah Mohamed Larbi Zarrouk, a minister under the reign of Hammuda ibn Ali.

The palace was constructed by a privateer and Dey Murad during the seventeenth century, and it was modified by the Zarrouk family during the eighteenth century.

== Architecture ==
It is composed mainly of a ground floor, the new owners added another house for their guests and a room to rest on the terraces. We can also find other outbuildings in the palace, such as a Grain Mill, a space to pray, and an inner garden.

Mohamed Zarrouk, son of the minister Mohamed Larbi Zarrouk built three more apartments during the nineteenth century.
