= Ali Khodja =

Algerian Kouloughli and dey

Ali V Khodja
- Dey
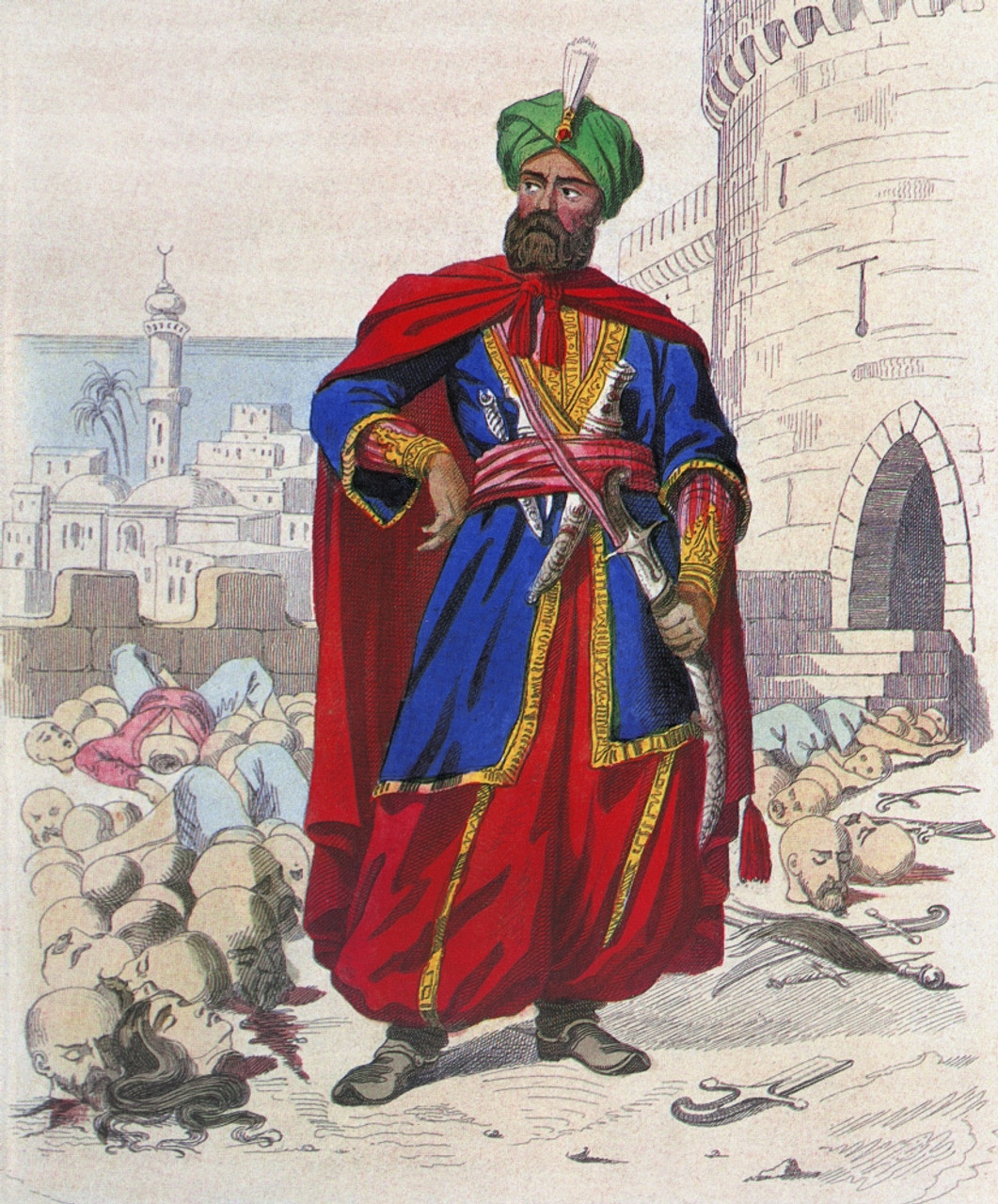
- Ali Khodja, surrounded by the severed heads of vanquished enemies after the bombardment of 1816

26th Dey of Algiers
- Reign: 1817–1818
- Predecessor: Omar Agha
- Successor: Hussein Dey
- Born: Ali Ben Ahmed c. 1764
- Died: March 1, 1818 (aged 53–54); Algiers, Algeria
Names
- Ali V Ben Ahmed Khodja
Regnal name
- Ali V
- Arabic: علي ابن أحمد خوجة
- Religion: Sunni Islam

Ali V Ben Ahmed, nicknamed Ali Khodja, Ali-Meguer, or Ali Loco (the mad) (Arabic: علي ابن أحمد خوجة) was a Kouloughli born in Algeria around 1764, of partial Mingrelian (Georgian) and Native Algerian origins.

He was the dey of the Deylik of Algiers from September 1817, taking the office just after the assassination of his predecessor Omar Agha on September 8, 1817. Ali remained in the office until his death in March 1818. His sobriquet Ali-Meguer may indicate his Mingrelian background.

== Deyship ==
He was complicit in the assassination of Ahmed bin Ali Khodja in 1808, and the assassination of Omar Agha (1817). He served in various important positions before being elected Dey in 1817.

A few days after his arrival, and to better ensure his safety, he left the Djenina Palace located in the lower part of the city of Algiers and offering small defenses to move to the casbah, where he put the treasury safe.

Using his connections to the Kabyles, he signed an alliance with the Zwawas, and the Kouloughlis.

After they attempted to rebel against his rule, Ali at one point had more than 1,500 Turkish janissaries executed.

== Death ==
He died of the plague on February 28, 1818.

After his death in 1818, he was buried in the Thaalibia Cemetery of the Casbah of Algiers.
