= American-Algerian War =

1785–1795 conflict between Algiers and the United States

American–Algerian War
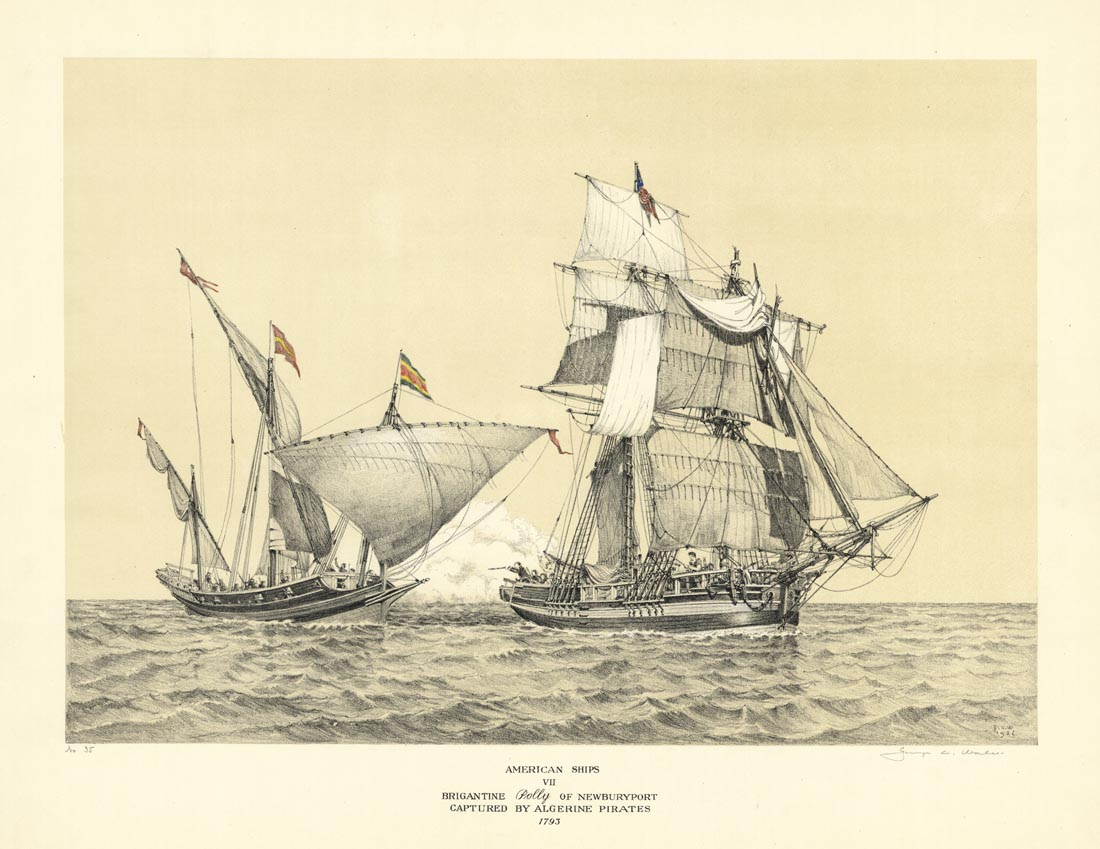
- Brigantine Polly of Newburyport Captured by Algerine Pirates, 1793
Date	1785–1795
Location	Mediterranean Sea and Atlantic Ocean
Result	Algerian victory

Belligerents
Regency of Algiers	United States

Commanders and leaders
Muhammad V Raïs Larbi	(United States) George Washington (from 1789)

Casualties and losses
Unknown	180+ captured 1 brig captured 53 merchant ships captured

The American-Algerian War was a state of conflict which existed between the Regency of Algiers and the United States that lasted from 1785 to 1795. Occurring after the U.S. became independent from the British Empire as a result of the American Revolutionary War, Algiers declared war on the United States after realizing that American merchant shipping was no longer under the protection of the Royal Navy.

== Background ==
The Barbary corsairs operated openly from key ports such as Algiers and Tunis, selling captured goods in local markets. Their tactics evolved to using a single, heavily manned vessel disguised as a small passenger ship, which allowed them to surprise their targets, seize valuables, and enslave crew and passengers for the Barbary slave trade. Originally relying heavily on privateering as its main source of revenue, Algiers shifted from a primarily military focus to a more commercial approach in the 18th century. Rather than engaging in costly naval conflicts, European powers like Britain and France often opted to pay tribute to avoid losses in ships, cargo, and personnel.

As Spanish power in the Mediterranean declined, and its interest in North Africa waned with the peace after the Spanish-Algerian War, Algerine foreign relations reached a balance between British and French interests. For the American colonies, British naval protection had shielded them from corsair attacks. However, after the Declaration of Independence in 1776, this security was lost. During the Revolutionary War, American ships were protected under the 1778 Treaty of Amity and Commerce with France, which explains the absence of recorded attacks on their vessels at that time. The American Revolution led Britain and France to relinquish their colonial influence and withdraw their military forces from the newly formed United States. When the latter obtained its independence in 1783, British diplomats informed Algiers that U.S. ships were no longer under their protection. American merchant ships in the Mediterranean became targets for the corsairs. Despite the persistent threat, American merchants remained engaged in trade with Mediterranean markets, exporting goods such as tobacco, furs, indigo, lumber, sugar, and molasses while importing silk, salt, olive oil, and manufactured products. The emergence of the United States as an independent nation without prior diplomatic relationship with Algiers introduced a new factor, which the Algerians swiftly sought to exploit. This aligned with their longstanding strategy toward Europe of "divide and prosper" while also providing a new source of tribute. The Algerian government treated the U.S. in the same manner it had dealt with European powers—both in peace and war. Algerian diplomacy was based on two key principles:

- Any foreign nation was considered an enemy until it signed a treaty of friendship and peace with Algiers.
- Any treaty that did not acknowledge Algerian sovereignty over the Mediterranean was deemed invalid and rejected by Algiers.

== War ==
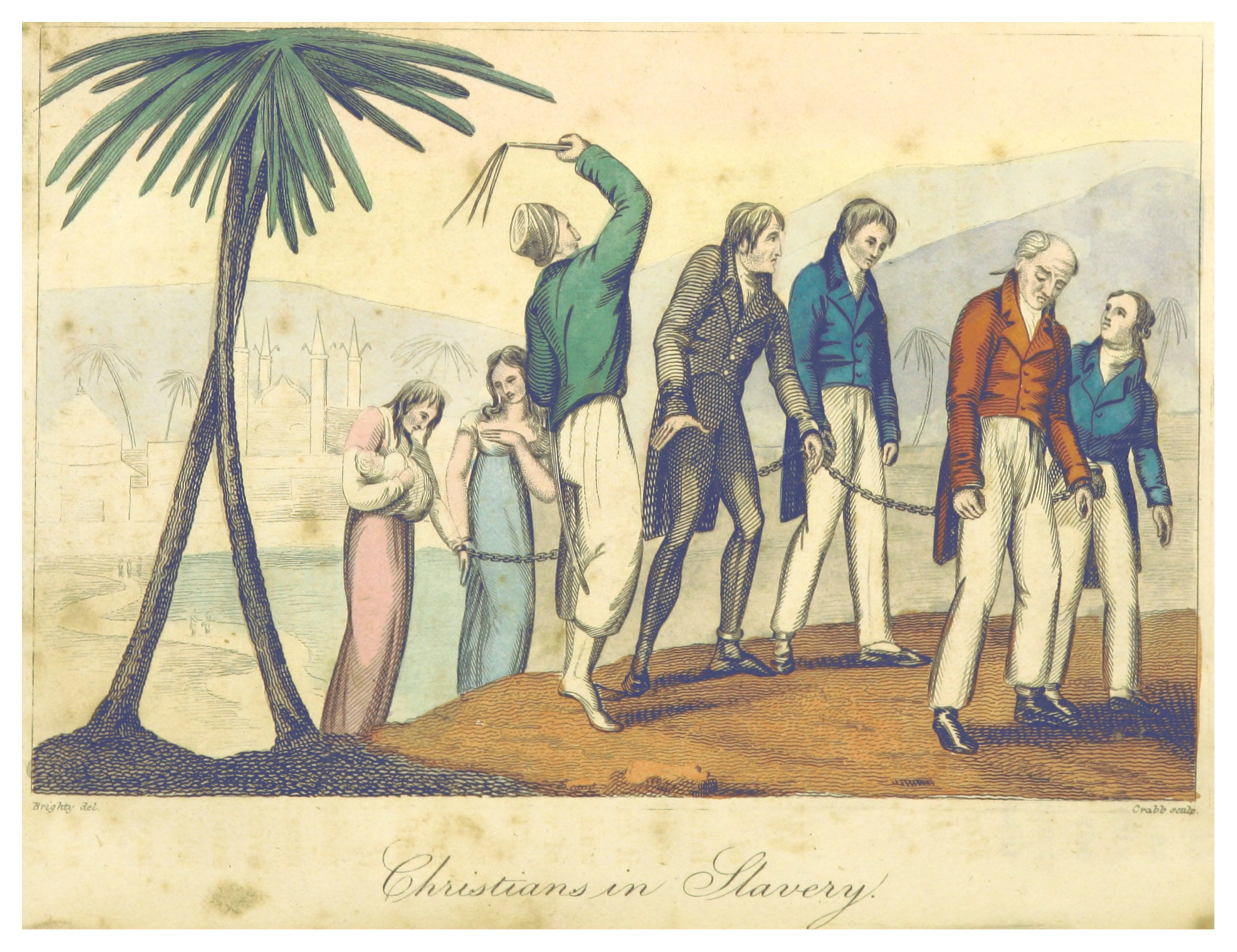
Christians in slavery, by Jackson George Anson. British Library

In 1785, Dey Muhammad ben-Osman declared war on the United States, leading to the capture of two American ships by Algerian fleets. On July 25, 1785, Admiral Raïs Larbi seized the Maria, commanded by Isaac Stevens and his crew, approximately 48 hours from Cádiz in the Atlantic Ocean; this was followed by the capture of the Dauphin shortly thereafter. A rumor that Benjamin Franklin, who was en route from France to Philadelphia about that time, had been captured by Barbary pirates, caused considerable upset in the U.S. As a result, the U.S. was forced into direct negotiations with the Algerian regency. American envoy John Lamb arrived in Algiers on March 25, 1786 to negotiate the release of American prisoners. The dey of Algiers demanded a ransom of $59,496 for the 21 American captives. However, the negotiations failed, as the financially struggling U.S. could neither afford a navy nor the tribute needed for protection. Lamb returned home empty-handed. This marked the first direct political engagement between independent U.S. and Algiers. The U.S. successfully formed a treaty with Morocco in 1786, yet couldn't satisfy Algiers financially. Thomas Jefferson, then U.S. Minister to France, was inclined to the idea of confronting Algiers with force. He wrote in his autobiography:

I was very unwilling that we should acquiesce in the European humiliation of paying a tribute to those lawless pirates and endeavored to form an association of the powers subject to habitual depredations from them.

A proposal was made to form a coalition of naval warships from nations at war with the Barbary states, specifically targeting Algerian vessels and enforcing a maritime blockade on North Africa. However, when the plan was presented to the relevant countries, France declined, while Spain, having recently concluded a treaty with Algiers, expressed its inability to participate. In contrast, Portugal, Malta, Naples, Venice, Denmark, and Sweden supported the initiative. Despite this backing, the project ultimately failed when the U.S. Congress rejected it due to concerns over its financial burden. Meanwhile, the absence of a treaty between the United States and the Regency of Algiers led to increased attacks on American ships. During George Washington's administration, foreign affairs took a backseat to the escalating French Revolutionary Wars, which disrupted American trade in Europe. As a result, relations with Algiers remained unresolved. It was not until February 1792—seven years after American sailors had been captured—that the United States made a renewed diplomatic effort.

Thomas Barclay, who had successfully negotiated with Morocco in 1786, was sent to Algiers with the authority to offer up to $100,000 for peace, along with an annual tribute of $13,500 and a ransom payment of $27,000. However, the political landscape had changed; Dey Muhammad had died in mid-1791, and his successor, Dey Hassan Pasha, continued the policy of demanding tribute from European powers. Recognizing that the U.S. lacked both the strength and determination to challenge Algerian corsairs, he saw little reason to negotiate. Consequently, Barclay's mission ended in failure.

Portugal's conflict with Algiers briefly safeguarded U.S. merchant ships in the Atlantic. However in 1793, a Portuguese-Algerian truce left American ships vulnerable. The Algerian Xebecs would be free to roam the Atlantic and 11 American ships were captured, while 100 American sailors were enslaved. According to the American historian John Baptist Wolf, the dey would consider the $80,000 ransom he was offered to free the captured sailors insufficient, although he was still impressed with the American president George Washington. In 1794, Congress passed the Naval Act, authorizing the creation of a defensive naval fleet. However, the legislation included a provision that would suspend the program if a treaty was reached with Algiers.

== Aftermath ==
US diplomats Joel Barlow, Joseph Donaldson, and Richard O'Brien secured treaties with Algiers, Tunis, and Tripoli, involving tribute payments. The Algiers treaty also released 83 American sailors out of 130 seamen.

== Bibliography ==
- الجيلالي [Al-Jilali], عبد الرحمن [Abdul Rahman] (1994). تاريخ الجزائر العام للعلامة عبد الرحمن الجيلالي الجزء الثالث: الخاص بالفترة بين 1514 إلى 1830م [The General History of Algeria by Abd al-Rahman al-Jilali, Part Three: Concerning the period between 1514 and 1830 AD] (in Arabic). Algiers: الشركة الوطنية للنشر والتوزيع [National Publishing and Distribution Company]. ISBN 978-9961-67-222-8.
- بوعزيز [Boaziz], يحيى [Yahya] (2007). الموجز في تاريخ الجزائر - الجزء الثاني [Brief history of Algeria - Part Two] (in Arabic). Algeria: ديوان المطبوعات الجامعية [University Publications Office]. ISBN 978-9961-0-1045-7. OCLC 949595451.
- Benguetaf, Hafid (2011-12-30). "The Barbary Treaties Between The USA And Algiers (1795-1816)". Algerian Scientific Journal Platform.
- Fremont-Barnes, Gregory (2006). The Wars of the Barbary Pirates. London: Osprey.
- Spencer, William (1976). Algiers in the Age of the Corsairs. Centers of civilization series. Norman, Oklahoma: University of Oklahoma Press. ISBN 978-0-8061-1334-0. OCLC 1958266.
- McCullough, David (2001). John Adams. Simon and Schuster. ISBN 978-1-4165-7588-7.
- Nowlan, Robert A (2014). The American Presidents, Washington to Tyler: What They Did, What They Said, What Was Said About Them, with Full Source Notes. McFarland. ISBN 978-1-4766-0118-2.
- Cogliano, Francis D (2014). Emperor of Liberty: Thomas Jefferson's Foreign Policy. Yale University Press. ISBN 978-0-300-17993-4.
- Wolf, John Baptiste (1979). The Barbary Coast: Algiers under the Turks, 1500 to 1830. New York, NY: Norton. ISBN 978-0-393-01205-7. OCLC 4805123.
