= Mohamed Khaznadji =

- Dey of Algiers
- Seal of Mohamed Khaznadji

24th Dey of Algiers
- Reign: 22 march 1815 – 7 april 1815
- Predecessor: Haji Ali
- Successor: Omar Agha (4 days later)

Khaznadji of the Regency of Algiers
- Reign: 1809 – 22 march 1815
- Predecessor: Unknown
- Successor: Unknown
- Born: Unknown
- Died: 7 April 1815; Algiers

Mohamed Khaznadji or Muhammad VI was the Dey of the Regency of Algiers briefly in 22 March - 7 April 1815, and was assassinated after having been in office for only 16 days.

== Biography ==
He served as khaznadji (treasurer) under his predecessor, Haji Ali, who reigned from 1809 to 1815. Following the assassination of Dey Hadj Ali, he was acclaimed as the new leader by the populace, but was ultimately arrested and executed just a few days later. During his tenure as *khaznadji* and subsequently as Dey, he uncovered financial misconduct within the militia (odjak) and attempted to take action, provoking reprisals from certain Janissaries leading up to his deposition and execution after only two weeks and 2 days of reign.

Preceded by Haji Ali	Dey of the Regency of Algiers; 1815–1815	Succeeded by Omar Agha
