= Omar Agha =

Dey of Algiers (c.1773-1817)

- Dey-Pasha of Algiers; Sultan of Algiers; Dey of Algiers
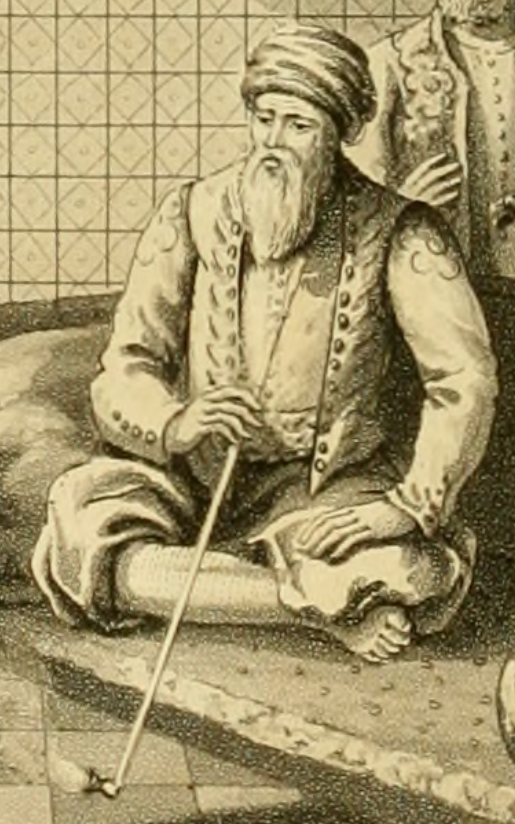
- Omar Agha (Sitting on the couch)

25th Dey of Algiers
- Reign: 11 April 1815 – 8 September 1817
- Predecessor: Mohamed Khaznadji
- Successor: Ali Khodja
- Born: Omar ben Mohammed c. 1773; Lesbos
- Died: 8 September 1817; Algiers
- Burial: Zawiya Thaalibia
- Issue: Mohamed; Ali
- Father: Mohamed

Omar Agha (c. 1773 – 8 September 1817) was the Dey of the Regency of Algiers from April 1815 to September 1817, after the assassination of his predecessor Mohamed Khaznadji on 7 April 1815, who had been in office for only 17 days.

== Early life ==
He was born on the island of Lesbos, to a family described in modern Turkish sources as "Turks" but without providing any evidence as to whether the family were Turkish settlers on Lesbos or descended from local Greek converts to Islam. However, the French historian of Ottoman Algeria/Regency of Algiers, Henri Delmas De Grammont, explicitly describes Omar Ağa Dey's family as being in origin Greek converts to Islam ("renégats grecs"), basing this on French colonial documents and interviews with descendants of the Dey in both Algeria and Turkey.

His name was Omar ben Mohammed. He left for Algiers at an unknown date, and first became a privateer, then a janissary. He soon became Agha of the Odjak of Algiers.

== Rule ==
He launched a war against Tunis, and led the attacks of Barbary privateers on American ships. An expedition of the US Navy led by Commodore Stephen Decatur in command of a squadron of nine ships, was conducted in 1815 against the Regency of Algiers. The episode is known as the Second Barbary War. The operation forced Dey Omar to sign a treaty ending attacks of piracy, a treaty that he denounced shortly thereafter.

The Congress of Vienna, which addressed the problem of Christian slaves from Barbary piracy, charged the United Kingdom and the Netherlands to negotiate with the Dey of Algiers and the Beys of Tunis and Tripoli. Although the latter two were agreeable, Omar Agha was not. It would take the 9-hour Bombardment of Algiers (1816) on 27 August 1816, by an Anglo-Dutch naval force commanded by British Admiral Lord Exmouth, to compel the Dey to abolish Christian slavery. However, the bombardment of Algiers did not destroy Barbary power. Despite the signing of the treaty and the release of 3,000 Christian slaves, Dey Omar set to rebuilding the city's defences, putting its Jewish inhabitants to forced labour in the place of Christian slaves. Moreover, the problem remained such that it was one of the main areas of contention at the Congress of Aix-la-Chapelle (1818).

== Death ==
Tomb of Omar Agha in the Zawiya Thaalibia

Omar died in his palace on September 8, 1817, strangled by his Janissaries following repeated defeats and internal troubles and was apparently already buried within an hour of his death. The conspiracy was led by Ali Khodja, his successor. Fearing the Janissaries, his son Mohamed was staying in Tiaret (at the village of Ain Sarb), while his second son, Ali, left the Regency of Algiers to settle in Tunis.

By the time of his death, he had repaired the fortifications, built new batteries, cleared the harbor, purchased and equipped four corsair ships, and secured Algiers against any attack from the sea

Preceded by Mohamed Kharnadji	Dey of the Regency of Algiers; 1815–1817	Succeeded by Ali ben Ahmed
