= Raïs Larbi =

Raïs Raïs Larbi
- رايس لعربي
- Born: 18th century Djurdjura
- Military career
- Allegiance: State of Algiers
- Branch: Algerian Navy: Taifa of the Raïs
- Service years: 1752–1790 (38 years)
- Rank: Admiral
- Commands: fleet of frigate, cruisers, and xebec; Maria
- Wars: American-Algerian War; Capture of Maria; Dano-Algerian War; Algerian-Maltese Conflicts; Barbary–Portuguese conflicts

Raïs Larbi or Larbi Raïs was one of the Algerian naval Admirals hailing from Djurdjura. He served in the Algerian Navy during the 18th century, between 1752 and 1790. He was the first to lead the fleet in the American-Algerian War.

== Background ==
Larbi Raïs hails from Djurdjura mountains in northeastern Algeria. his military career is not extensively documented despite his long service in the Algerian Navy, spanning about 38 years from his first documented battles in 1752 during the Algerian-Maltese conflicts until 1790, The earliest mention of him dates back to 1752, when two warships fell into the hands of the Knights of Malta. One was commanded by Raïs Larbi and the other by Raïs Slimane.

This account was confirmed by James Leander Cathcart, who later wrote a narrative of this first encounter in his journals after their detention. He noted that Raïs Larbi mentioned having fallen into captivity twice before. He expressed his wishes for the prisoners' freedom, stating that God would save them just as He had saved him twice in the past. He added that once they reached a peace settlement with the King of Britain, the Dey of Algiers would liberate them immediately.

== Fleet Composition ==
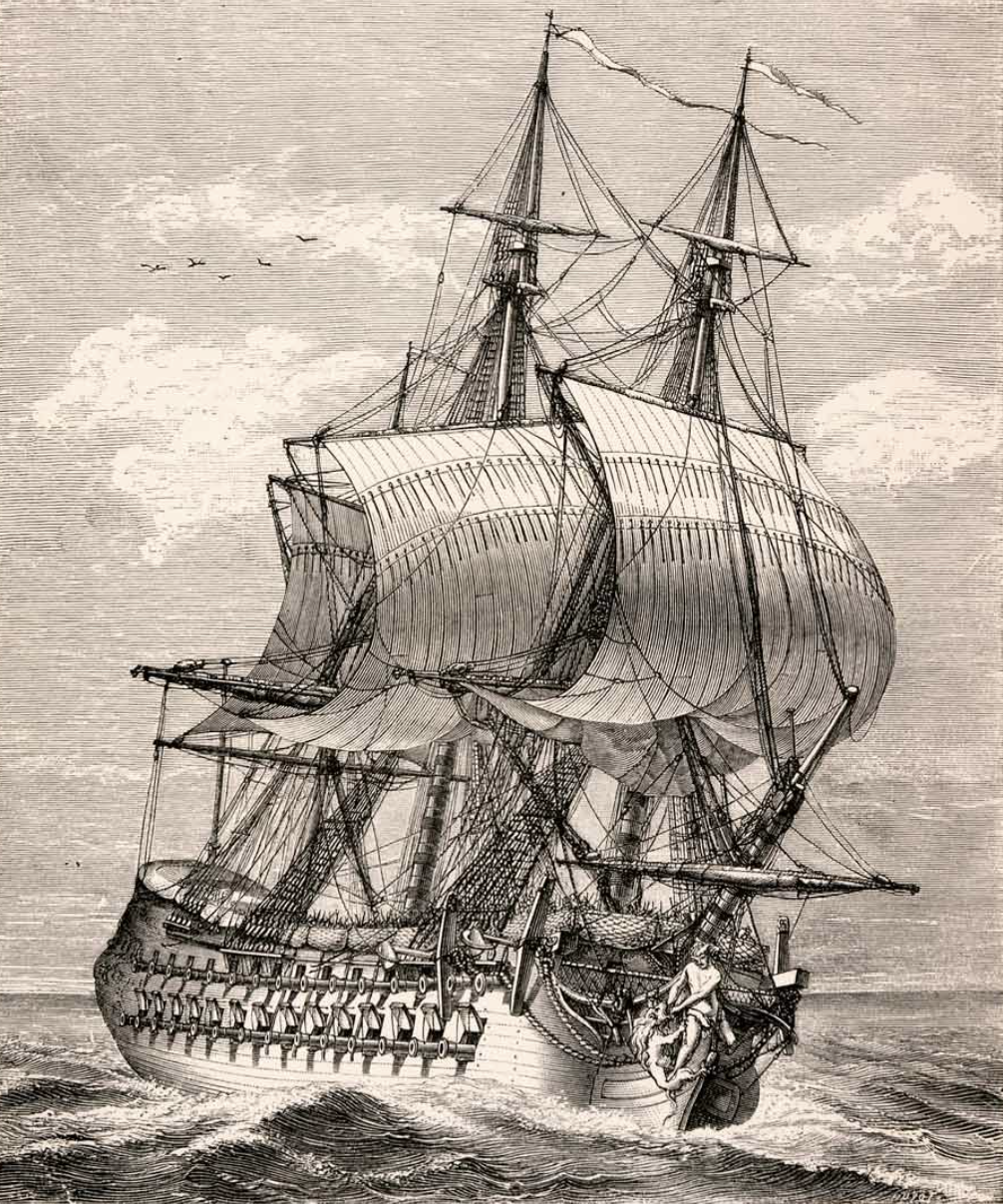
A frigate vessel, illustrating 18th-century naval architecture. An 18th-century Xebec under sail, engraved by Jean Baugean.

The formation of Raïs Larbi's fleet evolved over time. During the Algerian-Maltese conflicts, he commanded a squadron of three warships alongside Raïs Slimane. Later, he was the first to lead the Algerian Navy in the war against the United States, appearing at the head of a tactical fleet consisting of his flagship frigate, a xebec, and a group of cruisers, supported by small boarding vessels.

His fleet was strictly organized with a hierarchical structure of officers, boarding parties, and landing parties, with each unit led by a commander. It included a very large number of sailors, most of whom were "Maghrebis" of Algerian-Amazigh origin from the Atlas Mountains described as having blond hair and bright blue eyes. Also present were some brown-skinned Andalusian Moors, a Christians converts to Islam from southern Italy, some Black slaves, a small number of Turks, and an Irish convert to Islam.

== War against United States and Denmark ==
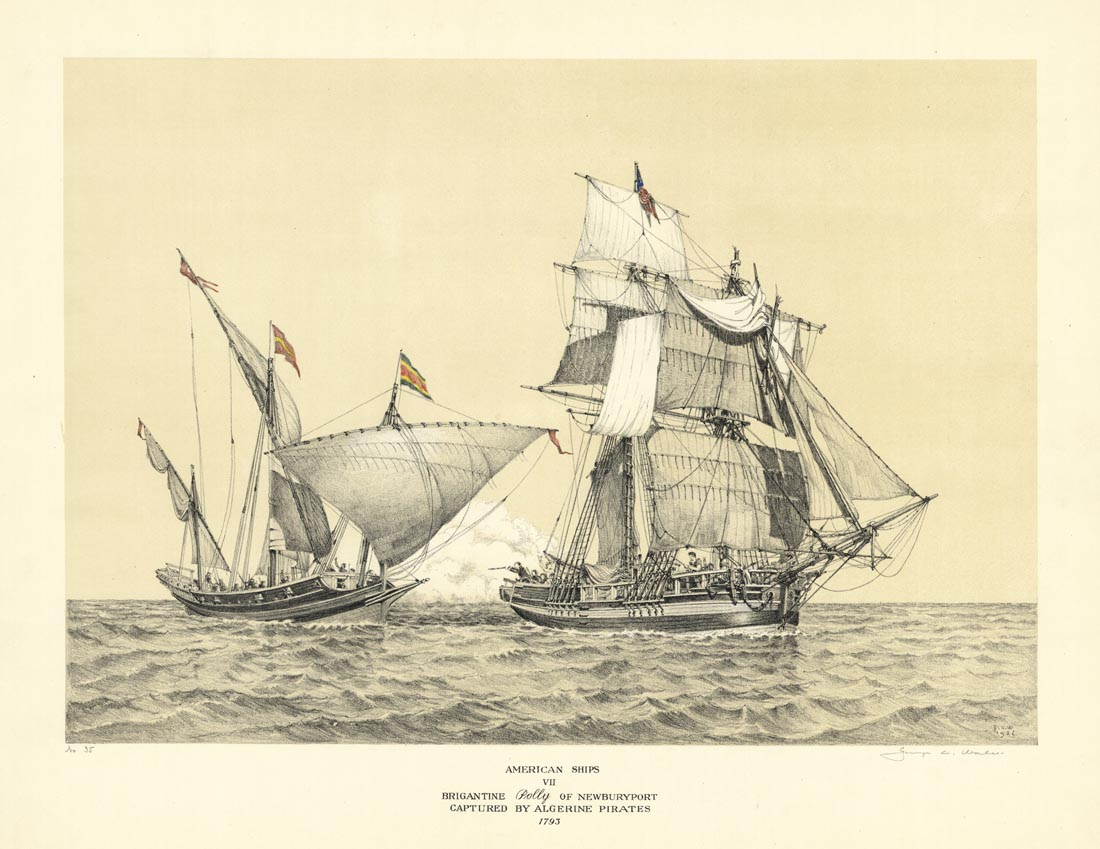
An Algerian Xebec capturing an American ship.

Raïs Larbi was the first to lead the Algerian Navy in the war against the United States, appearing at the head of a tactical fleet consisting of his main flagship frigate, a xebec, and a group of cruisers, supported by small boarding vessels. He was the first person to capture an American ship, an event that took place in the Atlantic Ocean on the morning of July 25, 1785.

The American schooner Maria was sailing three miles east of the Portuguese coast, hoping to reach Cádiz within the next 48 hours. At that time, an Algerian frigate had stopped two Danish brigs, but the captain of the Maria, Isaac Stevens, did not change course and continued sailing until the Algerian ship approached. The effectiveness of this fleet's patrol was already proven; just a week prior to the American encounter, the xebec under Larbi's command had successfully captured several 4 Portuguese fishing vessels, detaining thirty-six sailors and a Spanish woman who were already being held captive below decks when the Americans were boarded.

Armed Algerian sailors appeared, launched a small boat, boarded the Maria, and demanded the crew's nationality. The Algerian boarding party then searched the ship and loaded their spoils. When the Americans reached the frigate, the leader of the boarding party led his captives to the stern. There, they found a man shielded from the sun by a canvas awning, wearing a white cotton burnous and a red turban. He sat cross-legged on a patterned rug, smoking a water pipe. After a long look at the Americans and a thoughtful puff or two, he spoke in Spanish. James Cathcart provided the translation and later wrote an account of this first meeting in his memoirs. The master told them they were aboard an Algerian frigate and that he, Raïs Larbi, was the master of the Maria, his prize, and their captor. The ship then crossed the Strait of Gibraltar and headed to its home port, Algiers.

== See also ==
- American-Algerian War
- Dano-Algerian War
- State of Algiers
- Djurdjura
