= Haji Ali (Dey of Algiers) =

Dey of Algiers 1809–1815

Haji Ali Dey
- Dey of Algiers
- Painting of Hadj Ali IV by an unknown artist

23rd Dey of Algiers
- Reign: 21 march 1809 – 21 march 1815
- Predecessor: Ali III
- Successor: Muhammad VI (a day later)
- Born: Hadj Ali Ben Khalil
- Died: 21 March 1815; Algiers
Names
- Dey Ali IV ben Khalil
Regnal name
- Ali IV Dey
- Father: Khalil
- Religion: Islam
- Seal

Haji Ali ben Khalil also known as Ali IV was Dey of the Deylik of Algiers from 1809 – 1815.

He succeeded Ali ben Mohamed as head of the Regency of Algiers. His reign unfolded during a period marked by the internal political tensions and economic difficulties the Regency faced in the early 19th century.

== Biography ==
=== Early life ===
Although historical sources remain unclear regarding his early life and his date and place of birth, his Arab origin is well-established.

Before acceding to power, he held administrative posts within the Regency of Algiers. He became Dey following the death of his predecessor, Ali ben Mohamed, in 1809.

=== Rule ===
During his rule, Hadj Ali Dey had to contend with the political difficulties facing the Regency of Algiers, notably the rivalries between the various factions of the local Ottoman administration and financial problems.

He was known as a strict, but fiercely independent ruler. Throughout his reign, he waged war on Tunisia and various European and American countries. He was an avid sponsor of Barbary piracy, and he was also the one to reinvite Raïs Hamidou into the country. He deliberately attacked shipments from various Western countries, and even from Islamic countries like Morocco and the Ottoman Empire.

The relationship between Algeria and the Ottoman Empire during his rule were at an all-time low, and the Ottoman government lodged several complaints, and firmans against him, all of which he simply ignored.

=== Death ===
His reputation as a cruel ruler led to him making a few ennemies, he thus met his end as the victim of a plot with his throat slit in his bath on the 11th of Rajab 1230 (March 21, 1815).

After this, his khaznadji (equivalent to Prime Minister/Treasurer), Mohamed Khaznadji, briefly succeeded him before meeting his own end as well less than 3 weeks later. Whether or not he was involved in his predecessor's murder is unknown.

Preceded by Ali III bin Mohamed	Dey of the Regency of Algiers; 1809–1815	Succeeded by Mohamed Khaznadji
