= Djellouli family =

16th to 19th-century Tunisian elite family

The Djellouli family were an Makhzen family, which dated back to the Hafsid dynasty, according to historian Ahmad ibn Abi Diyaf. They were Sfax nobility of Arab origin, merchants and shipowners at the end of the 16th century, and became farmers and qaids in the 17th century, then part of the Capital Tunis aristocracy at the beginning of the 19th century. Notable members of the aristocratic family included Mahmoud Djellouli, M'hamed Djellouli, Taïeb Djellouli.
