= Treaty of Peace and Friendship between the United States and the Regency of Algiers =

1795 treaty

Treaty of Friendship between the United States and the Regency of Algiers
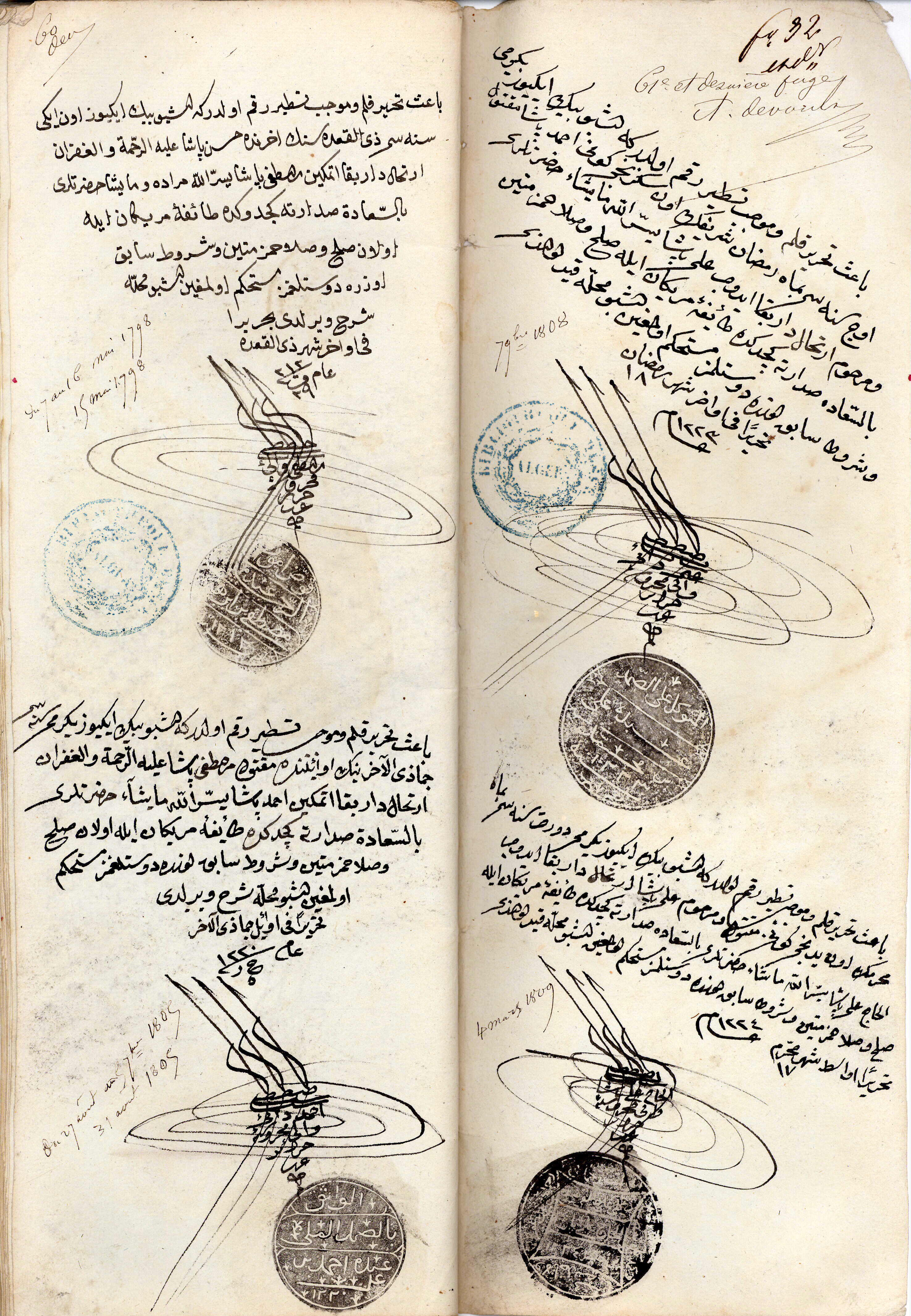
- Treaty of safety and peace between Hassan Pasha Dey of Algeria and George Washington, regarding the freedom of ships and not allowing the sale of Algerian ships to countries that are at war with America, September 05, 1795
- Signed: September 5, 1795
- Parties: Regency of Algiers; United States

A Treaty of Peace and Friendship was signed between the United States and the Regency of Algiers on 5 September 1795.

== Background ==
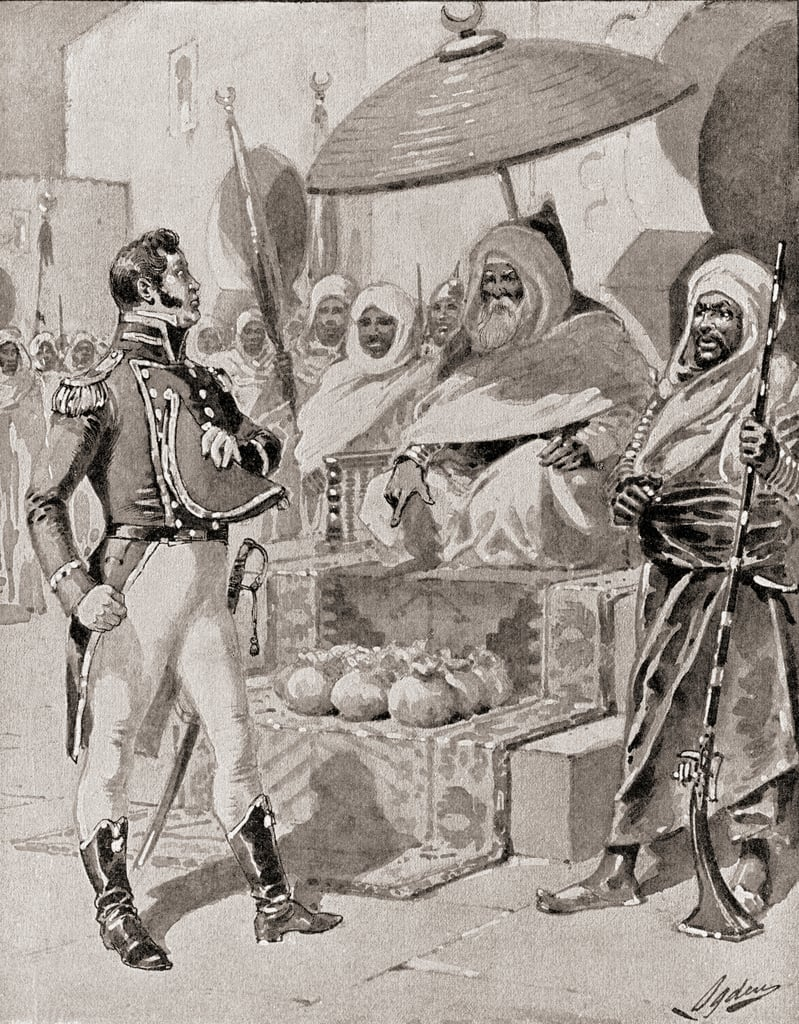
Captain William Bainbridge paid his respects to the dey of Algiers, on behalf of the United States; around 1800.

Following the independence of the United States (1776), American merchant ships no longer benefitted from the protection of Royal Navy ships, which was a problem for them in the Mediterranean. American ships were then found in 1785 attacked by the privateers of what the West then called Barbarism, corresponding to the Ottoman provinces of the Maghreb (modern Tunisia, Libya and Algeria). The United States Senate decided to propose a "Treaty of Peace and Friendship With the States of Barbaria", an amendment to which was initiated on 5 September 1795 in Algiers and again on 3 January 1797.

The treaty was unanimously ratified by the United States Senate in early June and signed by John Adams, the second American president, and appeared in what was the then US Official Gazette, the Philadelphia Gazette, on June 17, 1797.

== Tribute ==
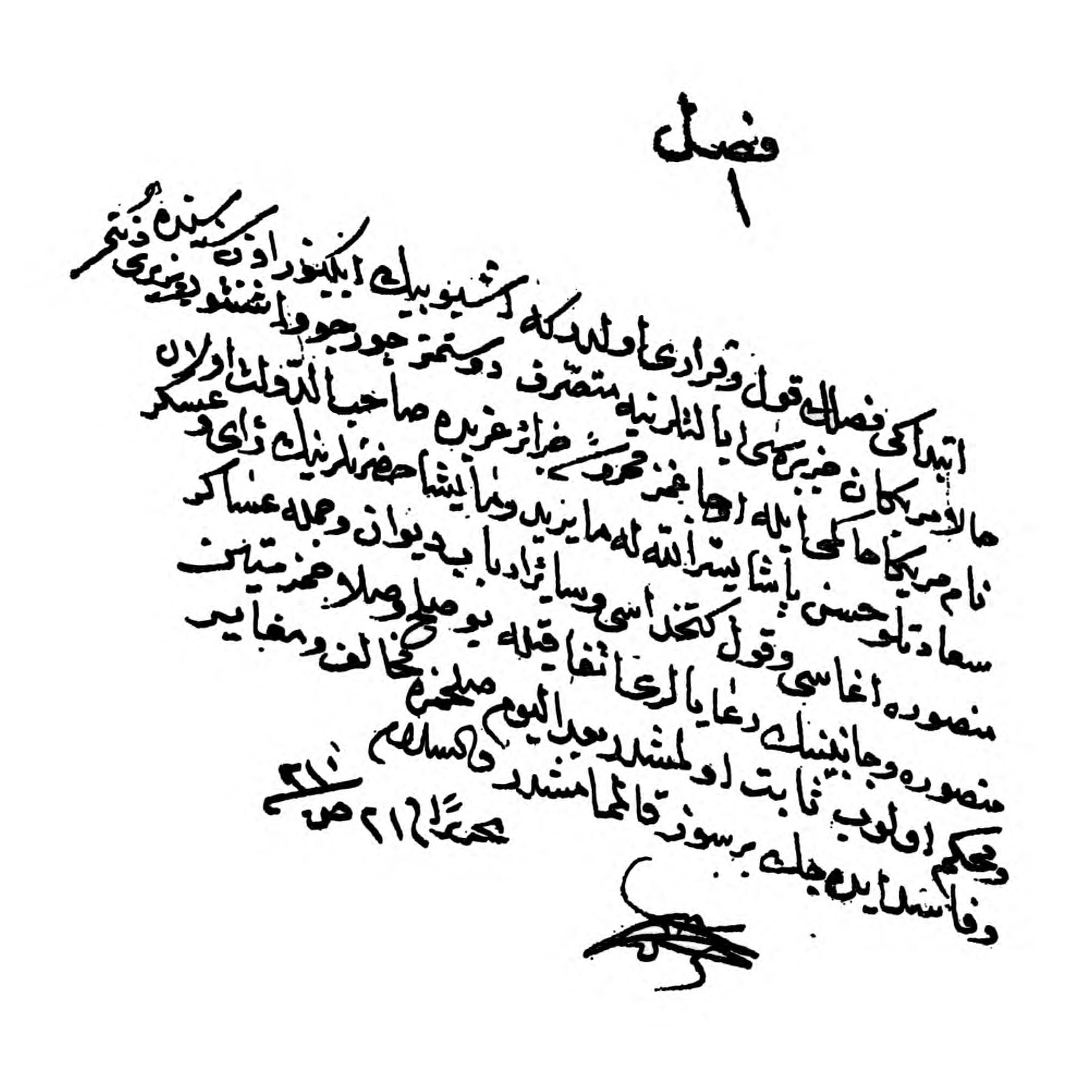
Reproduction of the first article of the original treaty, written in Ottoman Turkish, signed September 5, 1795 (21 Safar A.H. 1210).;

The United States federal government was to be annually charged the equivalent of 12,000 Algerian sequins (i.e US dollars 21,600, 64,800 gold francs) to protect its trade from piracy. This toll was served uninterrupted until 1810, and payment was suspended in 1811, and it was also to provide a 32-gun frigate and three other ships:

- Berge Crescent (renamed in Algiers El Merikana for The American) of 32 guns, designer Josiah Fox, launched 29/06/1797 at Portsmouth, 122 feet – 32 feet plus 10 feet 2 inches;
- 22-gun brig Hassan Bashaw/Hassan Pasha, designer Samuel Humphreys, launched in 1798 in Philadelphia, 275 long tone, 97 feet or 93 feet 2 inches plus 27 feet plus 11 feet 6 inches
- 20-gun schoonk Skjoldebrand, designer Benjamin Hutton, built at Philadelphia, 77 feet 6 inches plus 23 feet plus 10 feet 6 inches;
- 18-gun Lelah Eisha schooner, designer Samuel Bowers.

The treaty was purchased by the United States at an estimated cost of USD 992,463.25 by the United States Department of the Treasury.

== Continuation ==
In 1801, Yusuf Karamanli, the pasha of Tripoli, demanded that the United States pay an increase in the United States' price. This demand was repulsed and the pasha with his allies from the Barbary Coast declared war on the United States on 14 May 1801.

US President Thomas Jefferson then sent United States Navy ships shelling the cities of Tripoli and Algiers and renegotiated the treaty in 1805.

In April 2006, US Secretary of State Condoleezza Rice offered a copy of the original of the treaty to Algerian Foreign Minister Mohammed Bedjaoui.
