= Mohamed Larbi Zarrouk =

Tunisian politician

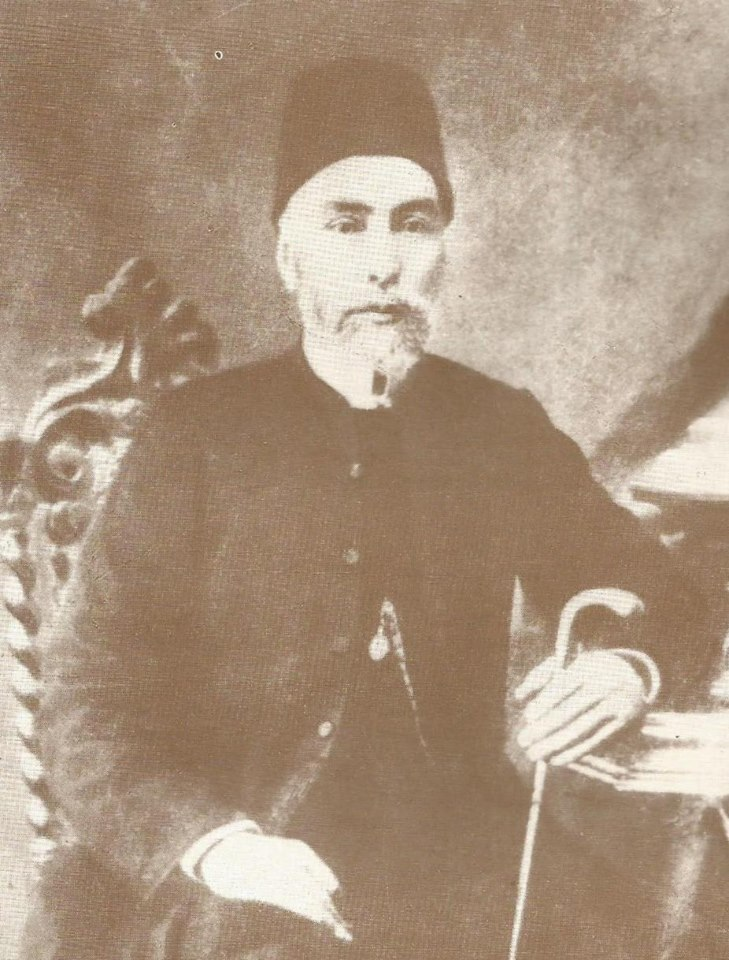
Mohamed Larbi Zarrouk

Mohamed Larbi Zarrouk (Arabic: أبو عبد الله محمد العربي زروق), (born October 29, 1822, Le Bardo, died June 4, 1902, Medina), was a Tunisian politician.

== Family background ==
He was born into a Sharifian family of landowners from Béja. His grandfather Mohamed Larbi Zarrouk Khaznadar, Minister of Finance and then Principal Minister, had been executed in 1822. The repression in the Sahel following the Mejba Revolt in 1864 was carried out by General Ahmed Zarrouk, a Mamluk of Greek origin who had been freed and adopted by his grandfather.

== Career ==
Having become a civil servant, Mohamed continued the career of his father, Mohamed Zarrouk, administrator of the Beylical palaces under the reign of Ahmad Bey. Zarrouk was appointed president of the municipal council and mayor of Tunis, a position he held between 1869 and 1881, replacing General Husseïn. He then became the first principal of Sadiki College, between 1875 and 1881, under Hayreddin Pasha.

Fiercely hostile to the establishment of the French protectorate during the signing of the Treaty of Bardo, he fled to the chancellery of the United Kingdom, from where he succeeded in reaching Istanbul thanks to the support of the British consul. He ended his days in Medina, where he is buried.
