= Mahmud ibn Muhammad =

Bey of Tunis (1757–1824)

Bey of Tunis
- Reign: 20 December 1814 – 28 March 1824
- Predecessor: Uthman ibn Ali
- Successor: Al-Husayn II ibn Mahmud
- Born: Mahmud Ben Mouhammad Rachid Bey; 10 July 1757; Le Bardo, Kingdom of Tunisia
- Died: 28 March 1824 (aged 66); Tunis, Kingdom of Tunisia
- Burial: Tourbet el Bey, Tunis, Tunisia
- Spouse: Amina Beya
- Issue: Al-Husayn II ibn Mahmud; Mustafa ibn Mahmud; Lalla Aziza Beya; Lalla Zoubaida Beya
Names
- Mahmoud Ben Mouhammed Rashid Bey
- Dynasty: Husainides
- Father: Muhammad I ar-Rashid
- Religion: Islam

Mahmud ibn Muhammad (Arabic: محمود الأول بن محمد), commonly referred to as Mahmoud Bey (Arabic: محمود باي ; 10 July 1757 – 28 March 1824) was the seventh leader of the Husainid Dynasty and the ruler of Tunisia from 1814 until his death in 1824. His father was Muhammad I ar-Rashid.

== See also ==
- Hussein Khodja

Preceded by Uthman ibn Ali	Bey of Tunis; 1814–1824	Succeeded by Hussein II Bey
