= Al-Husayn II ibn Mahmud =

Bey of Tunis (1784–1835)

Bey of Tunis
- Reign: 28 March 1824 – 20 May 1835
- Predecessor: Mahmud ibn Muhammad
- Successor: Mustafa ibn Mahmud
- Born: Al-Husayn II ibn Mahmud Bey; 5 March 1784; Le Bardo, Kingdom of Tunisia
- Died: 20 May 1835 (aged 51); La Goulette, Kingdom of Tunisia
- Burial: Tourbet el Bey, Tunis, Tunisia
- Spouse: Lalla Fatima Mounastiri; Lalla Saliha
- Issue: Muhammad II ibn al-Husayn; Muhammad III as-Sadiq; Ali III ibn al-Husayn; Muhammad al-Ma'mun Bey; Taieb Bey; Mohammed Adel Bey; Lalla Mamia Kebira Beya; Lalla Kabira Beya; Lalla Hafsia Beya; Lalla Aisha
Names
- Hussein II Ben Mahmoud Bey
- Dynasty: Husainides
- Father: Mahmud ibn Muhammad
- Religion: Islam

Al-Husayn II ibn Mahmud (Arabic: حسين الثاني بن محمود), commonly referred to as Hussein II Bey (Arabic: حسين باي الثاني ; 5 March 1784 – 20 May 1835) was the Bey of Tunis from 1824 until his death in 1835. He was of a Greek descent royal family.

== See also ==
- Hussein Khodja

Flag of Tunisia, which he introduced in 1827.

Preceded by Mahmud ibn Muhammad	Bey of Tunis; 1824–1835	Succeeded by Mustafa ibn Mahmud
