= Boatswain =

Supervisor of a ship's deck department

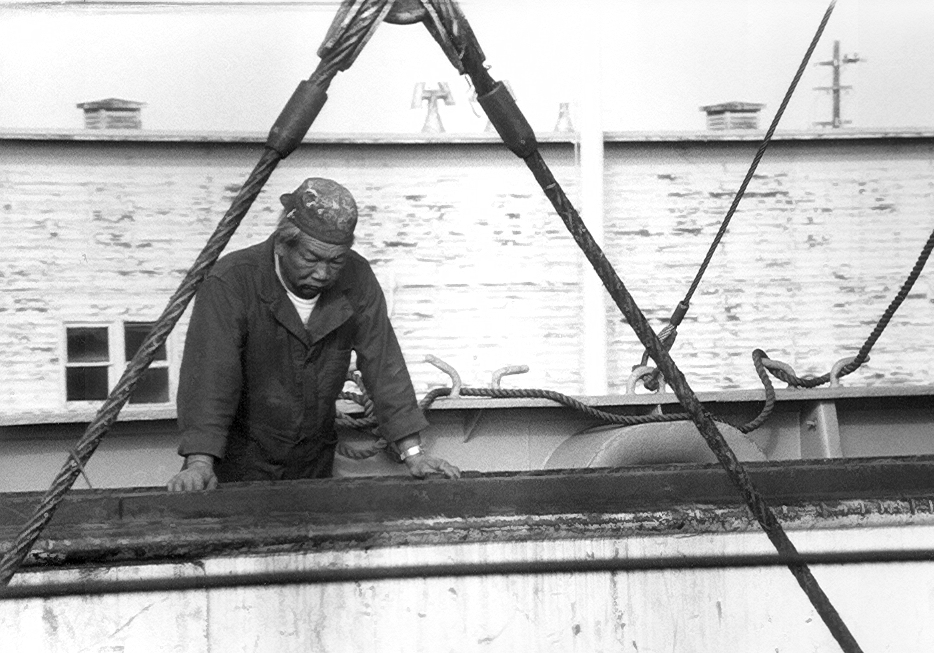
- The boatswain aboard a US merchant ship stands cargo watch as freight is lowered into an open hatch, c. 1981

General
- Other names: Bosun; Deck Boss; Chief rate
- Department: Deck department
- Licensed: No
- Requirements: Typically, able seaman certificate

Watchstanding
- Watch (at sea): On smaller vessels (varies)
- Watch (in port): On smaller vessels (varies)

A boatswain (/ˈboʊsən/ BOH-sən, formerly and dialectally also /ˈboʊtsweɪn/ BOHT-swayn) is the most senior rate of the deck department and is responsible for the components of a ship's hull. The boatswain supervises the other members of the ship's deck department and typically is not a watchstander, except on vessels with small crews. Additional duties vary depending upon ship, crew and circumstances. The name is also known as bo's'n, bos'n, bosun, deck boss, a qualified member of the deck department or the third hand on a fishing vessel.

== History ==
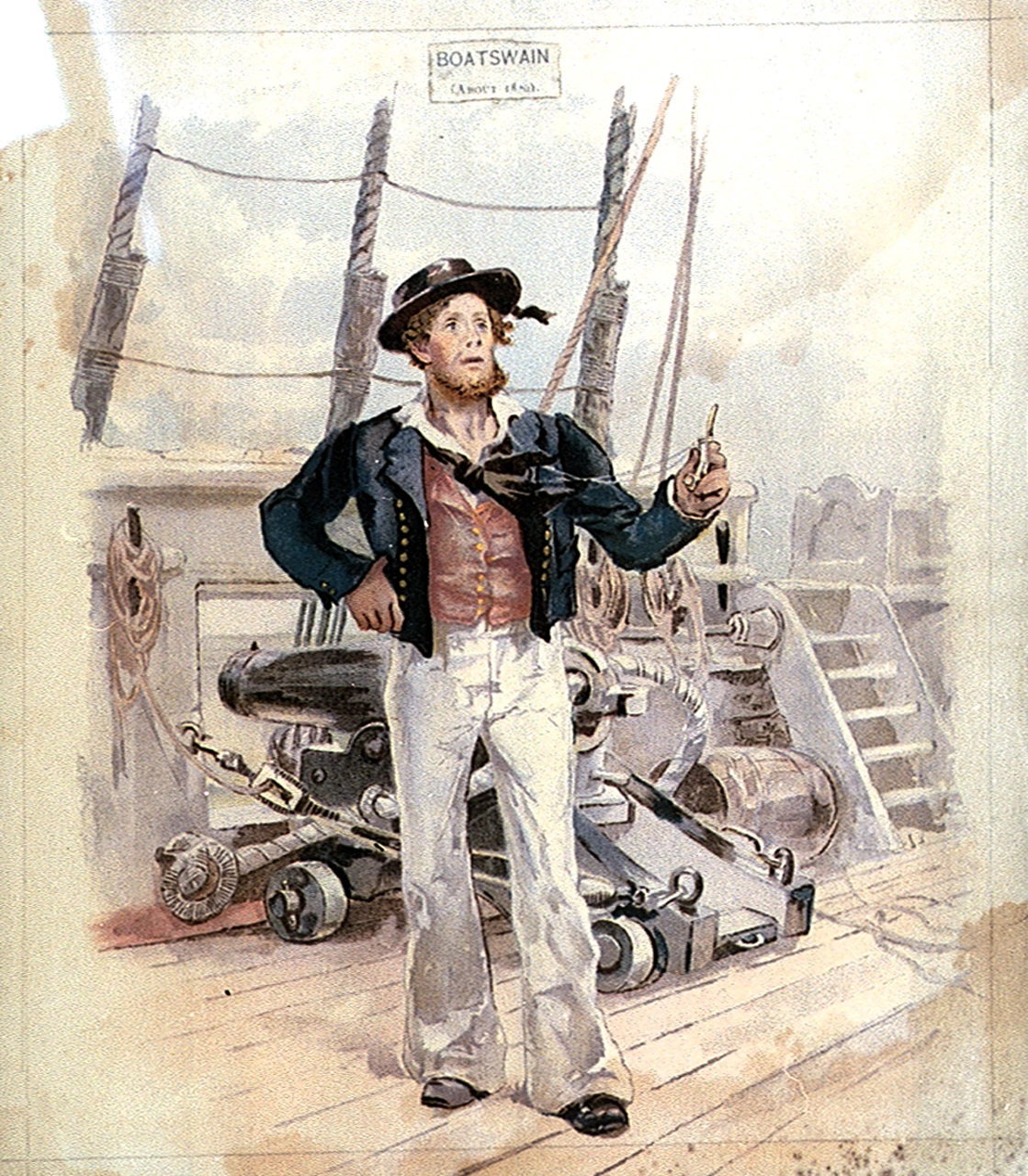
c. 1820 illustration of a Royal Navy boatswain

The word boatswain has been in the English language since approximately 1450. It is derived from late Old English batswegen, from bat (boat) concatenated with Old Norse sveinn (swain), meaning a young man, apprentice, a follower, retainer or servant. Directly translated to modern Norwegian it would be båtsvenn, while the actual crew title in Norwegian is båtsmann ("boats-man"). The phonetic spelling bosun is reported as having been observed since 1868.

=== Royal Navy ===
The rank of boatswain is the oldest in the Royal Navy but its origins can be traced back to the year 1040. In that year, when Five anglo saxon ports began furnishing warships to King Edward the Confessor in exchange for certain privileges, they also furnished crews whose officers were the master, boatswain, carpenter and cook. Later these officers were warranted by the British Admiralty. They maintained and sailed the ships and were the standing officers of the navy.

The Royal Navy's last official boatswain, Commander E.W. Andrew OBE, retired in 1990. However, most RN vessels still have a Chief Boatswain's Mate (or "Buffer"), who is the most senior rating in the Seaman Specialist department.

== Naval cadets ==
The rank of cadet boatswain, in some schools, is the second highest rank in the combined cadet force naval section that a cadet can attain, below the rank of coxswain and above the rank of leading hand. It is equivalent to the rank of colour sergeant in the army and the Royal Marine cadets; it is sometimes an appointment for a senior petty officer to assist a coxswain.

== Job description ==
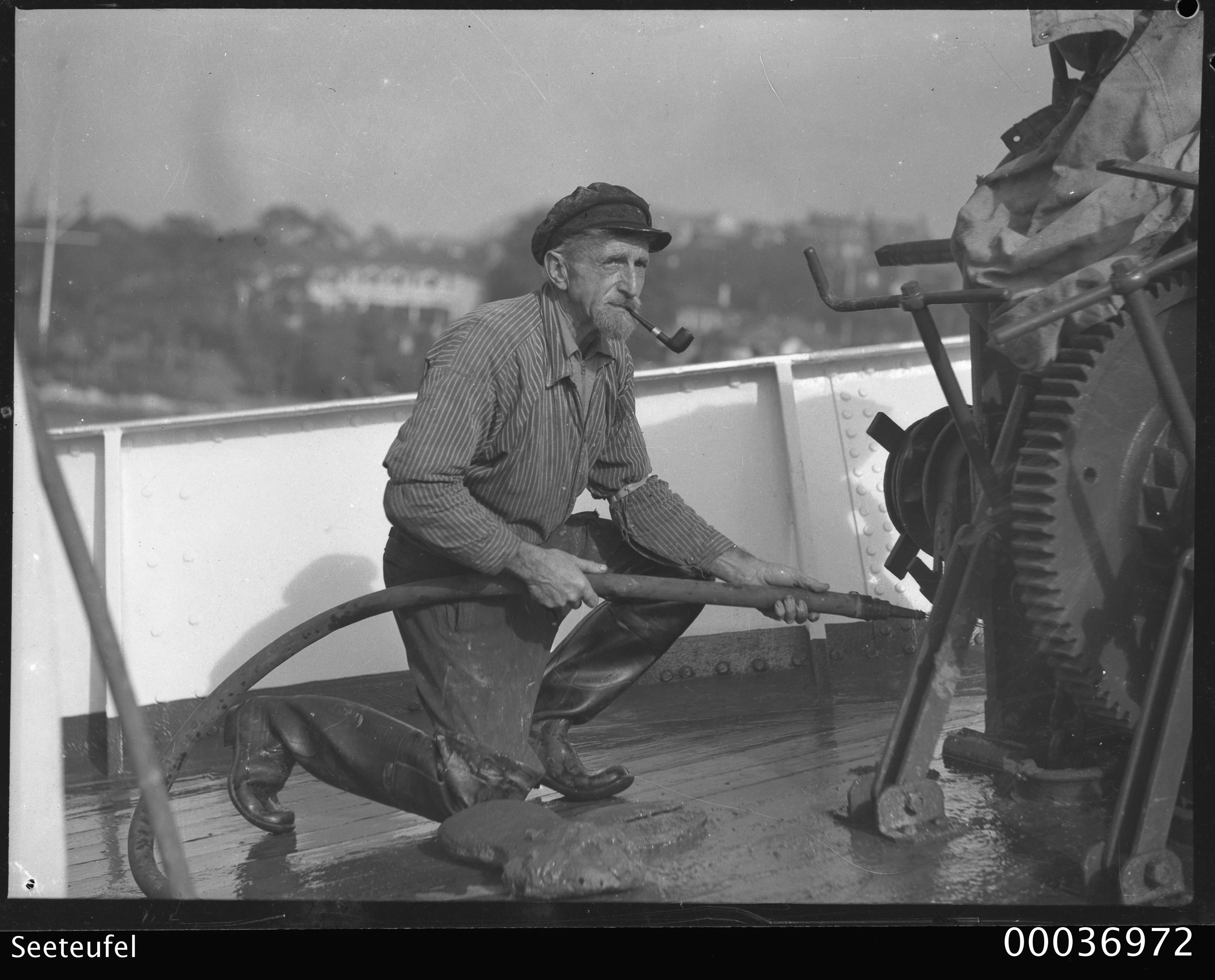
Boatswain of Felix von Luckner's yacht Seeteufel, smoking a pipe and hosing the vessel's deck

The boatswain works in a ship's deck department as the foreman of the unlicensed (crew members without a mate's licence) deck crew. Sometimes, the boatswain is also a third or fourth mate. A boatswain must be highly skilled in all matters of marlinespike seamanship required for working on deck of a seagoing vessel. The boatswain is distinguished from other able seamen by the supervisory roles: planning, scheduling and assigning work.

As deck crew foreman, the boatswain plans the day's work and assigns tasks to the deck crew. As work is completed, the boatswain checks on completed work for compliance with approved operating procedures.

Outside the supervisory role, the boatswain regularly inspects the vessel and performs a variety of routine, skilled and semi-skilled duties to maintain all areas of the ship not the responsibility of the engine department. These duties can include cleaning, painting and maintaining the vessel's hull, superstructure and deck equipment as well as executing a formal preventive maintenance programme. A boatswain's skills may include cargo rigging, winch operations, deck maintenance and working aloft. The boatswain is well versed in the care and handling of lines and has knowledge of knots, hitches, bends, whipping and splices as needed to perform tasks such as mooring a vessel. The boatswain typically operates the ship's windlasses when letting go and heaving up anchors. Moreover, a boatswain may be called upon to lead firefighting efforts or other emergency procedures encountered on board. Effective boatswains are able to integrate their seafarer skills into supervising and communicating with members of deck crew with often diverse backgrounds.

Originally, on board sailing ships the boatswain was in charge of a ship's anchors, cordage, colours, deck crew and the boats. The boatswain would also be in charge of the rigging while the ship was in dock. The boatswain's technical tasks were modernised with the advent of steam engines and subsequent mechanisation.

A boatswain also is responsible for doing routine pipes using what is called a boatswain's call.

== Notable boatswains ==
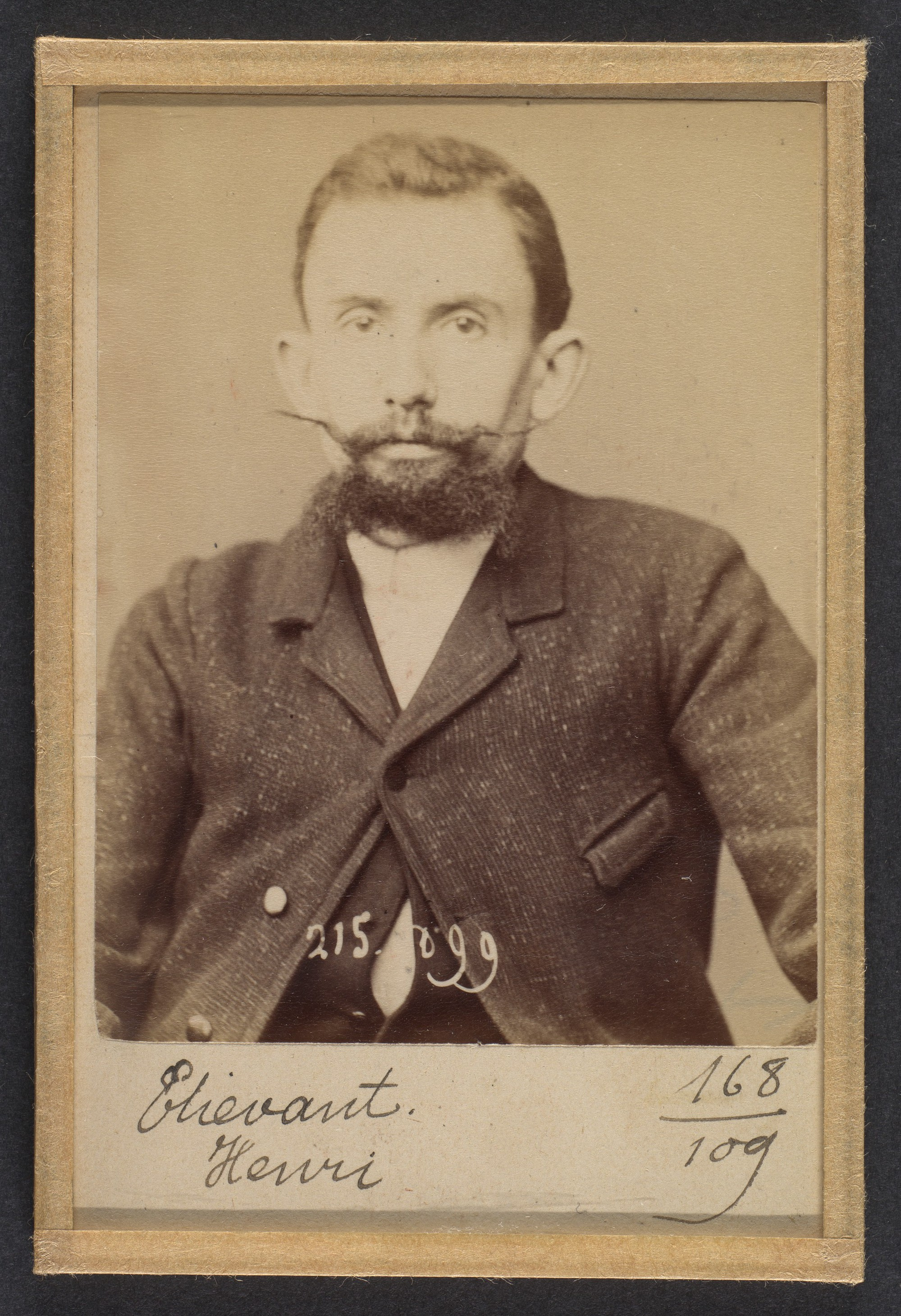
Henri 'the Boatswain' Etiévant's mugshot by Alphonse Bertillon (Anthropometric File of Anarchists - 1894)

A number of boatswains and naval boatswains mates have achieved fame. Reuben James and William Wiley are famous for their heroism in the Barbary Wars and are namesakes of the ships USS Reuben James and USS Wiley. Medal of Honor recipients Francis P. Hammerberg and George Robert Cholister were U.S. Navy boatswain's mates, as was Navy Cross recipient Stephen Bass. Victoria Cross recipients John Sheppard, John Sullivan, Henry Curtis and John Harrison were Royal Navy boatswain's mates.

During World War II Bosun John Crisp RN is mentioned in "The Colditz Story" by fellow prisoner of war at Colditz Castle, and later escapee, Pat Reid. Crisp provided the expertise and enthusiasm to manufacture torn and then woven "bedsheet ropes", tested for appropriate strength using his extensive maritime experience.

Also during World War II, Chief Boatswain Arthur Parker rescued a horse injured by Japanese attacks on the island of Tulagi in Guadalcanal and was able to bring her back to the United States on the Victory ship "Jack London". Parker's experiences were portrayed in the second half of the 1946 MGM film "Gallant Bess".

There are also a handful of boatswains and boatswain's mates in literature. The boatswain in William Shakespeare's The Tempest is a central character in the opening scene, which takes place aboard a ship at sea, and appears again briefly in the final scene. Typhoon by Joseph Conrad has a nameless boatswain who tells Captain MacWhirr of a "lump" of men going overboard during the peak of the storm. Also, the character Bill Bobstay in Gilbert and Sullivan's musical comedy H.M.S. Pinafore is alternatively referred to as a "bos'un" and a "boatswain's mate". Another boatswain from literature is Smee from Peter Pan. Lord Byron had a Newfoundland dog named Boatswain. Byron wrote the famous poem "Epitaph to a Dog" and had a monument made for him at Newstead Abbey. The 1907 naval gothic novel The Boats of the "Glen Carrig" by William Hope Hodgson features the character of the ship's "bo'sun" as an important member of the crew and a personal friend to the narrator.

Billy Bones was a boatswain in the fictional Starz TV show Black Sails.

== See also ==
- Boatswain's mate (United States Coast Guard)
- Boatswain's mate (United States Navy)
- Bootsmann
- Bosun's chair
- Buffer (navy)
- Deck department
- Merchant Navy (United Kingdom)
- Seafarer's professions and ranks
- Serang (disambiguation)
- Ship transport
- United States Merchant Marine

== Notes ==
This article incorporates text from public-domain sources, including websites. For specific sources of text, see notes.
