= USS Reuben James =

Three ships of the United States Navy have borne the name USS Reuben James. Reuben James was a boatswain's mate who distinguished himself fighting the Barbary pirates.

- The first USS Reuben James (DD-245), a four-stack Clemson-class destroyer, was the first US Navy ship sunk by hostile action in the European Theatre in World War II.
- The second USS Reuben James (DE-153), a Buckley-class destroyer escort, escorted convoys during World War II.
- The third USS Reuben James (FFG-57) was an Oliver Hazard Perry-class guided missile frigate.
