= USS Edwards (DD-619) =

Gleaves-class destroyer

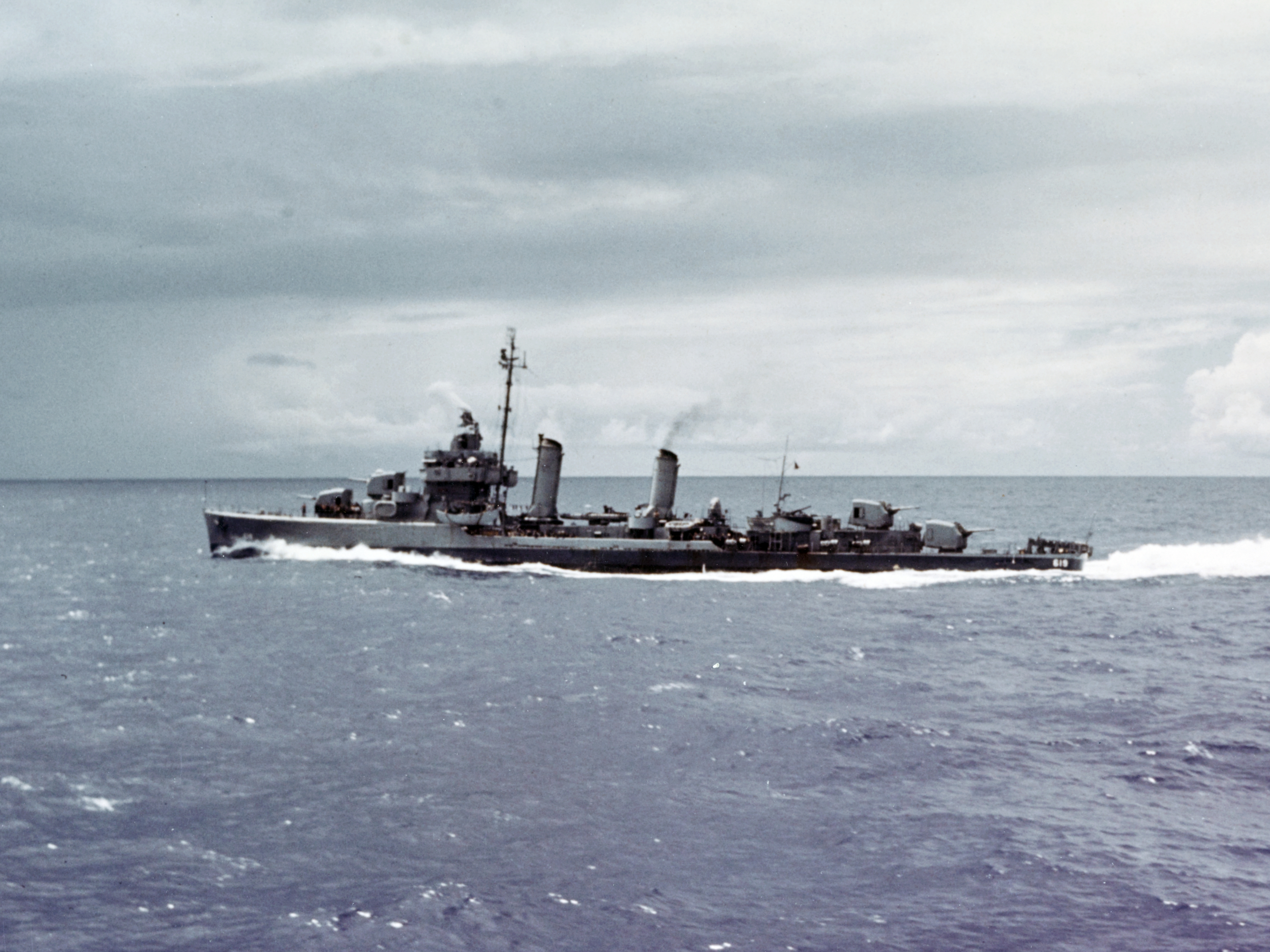
- 'USS Edwards underway in the Caribbean Sea during her shakedown period, c. November 1942.

History

United States
- Name: Edwards
- Namesake: Walter A. Edwards
- Builder: Federal Shipbuilding and Drydock Company
- Laid down: 26 February 1942
- Launched: 19 July 1942
- Commissioned: 18 September 1942
- Decommissioned: 11 April 1946
- Stricken: 1 July 1971
- Fate: Sold 25 May 1973 and broken up for scrap

General characteristics
- Class & type: Gleaves-class destroyer
- Displacement: 1,630 long tons (1,660 t)
- Length: 348 ft 3 in (106.15 m)
- Beam: 36 ft 1 in (11.00 m)
- Draft: 11 ft 10 in (3.61 m)
- Installed power: 50,000 shp (37,000 kW)
- Propulsion: 2 × geared steam turbines; 4 × boilers; 2 × shafts
- Speed: 37.4 kn (43.0 mph; 69.3 km/h)
- Range: 6,500 nmi (7,500 mi; 12,000 km) at 12 kn (14 mph; 22 km/h)
- Complement: 16 officers, 260 enlisted
- Armament: 4 × 5 in (127 mm)/38 cal dual purpose guns; 6 × .50 in (12.7 mm) machine guns; 6 × 20 mm (0.79 in) anti-aircraft autocannons; 10 × 21 in (533 mm) torpedo tubes; 6 × depth charge projectors; 2 × depth charge tracks

USS Edwards (DD-619) was a Gleaves-class destroyer of the United States Navy. She was the second Navy ship named "Edwards", and the first named for Lieutenant Commander Walter A. Edwards (1886–1926), who as commander of Bainbridge in 1922 rescued nearly five hundred people from the burning French transport Vinh-Long. For his heroism Edwards was awarded the U.S. Medal of Honor, the French Légion d'honneur, and the British Distinguished Service Order.

Edwards was launched on 19 July 1942 by Federal Shipbuilding and Drydock Company, Kearny, New Jersey; sponsored by Mrs. Edward Brayton, widow of Lieutenant Commander Edwards. The ship was commissioned on 18 September 1942.

== Service history ==
=== 1943 ===
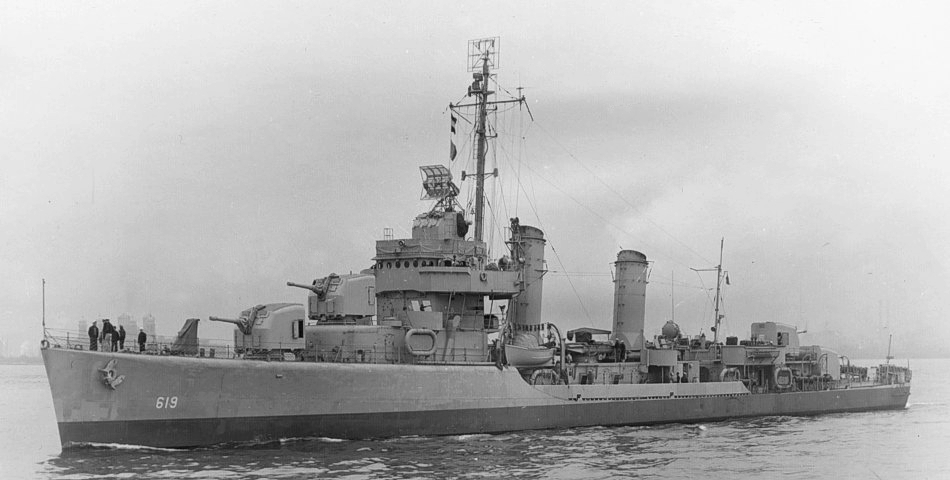
Edwards off New York Navy Yard, 8 November 1942.

After brief service escorting convoys along the east coast and in the Caribbean, Edwards sailed from New York on 8 November 1942 to join the Pacific Fleet. She joined Task Force 18 (TF 18) at Nouméa on 4 January 1943, to cover a large troop convoy bound for Guadalcanal. On 29 January, they were attacked by a swarm of Japanese torpedo bombers off Rennell Island. Although most were driven off by the heavy accurate fire of the ships, enough broke through to put two torpedoes into Chicago. Edwards with four other destroyers was detached to screen the damaged cruiser. On the following day, as the group sailed for Espiritu Santo, attacks continued. The destroyers put up a stout defense, but Chicago was torpedoed again and sank. Edwards rescued 224 of the 1,049 survivors. One of the other screening destroyers, La Vallette, was also torpedoed. Edwards saw her safely to port before rejoining her task group.

Edwards returned to Pearl Harbor on 27 March for overhaul, then set sail for the Aleutians on 15 April. She saw action bombarding Attu on 26 April, and as antiscreen for Pennsylvania during the landings of 11 May. The following day she teamed with Farragut for a 10-hour depth charge attack on a submarine which attempted to torpedo the battleship. I-31 was forced to the surface and badly damaged by Edwards' guns before diving, only to be sunk by Frazier.

Edwards continued to ply Aleutian waters on antisubmarine patrol. In June 1943, she joined the blockade patrol, which bombarded Kiska Island from 2–12 August, and covered the landings on 15 June. After overhaul, she returned to Espiritu Santo in October for training.

On 8 November, Edwards sailed to screen aircraft carriers in air strikes on Rabaul on the 11th. A flight of Japanese planes attacked her task group at noon that day; Edwards and her companions drove off or splashed every plane before they could damage any American ship. She screened the support force at Tarawa from 19 November, then escorted transports to Pearl Harbor en route to the west coast for a brief overhaul.

=== 1944 ===
On 3 March, she arrived at Majuro off which she patrolled as well as screening strikes on Mili Atoll in the Marshall Islands and in the Palaus by aircraft carriers of the 5th Fleet. In April, she guarded the carriers as they launched air attacks on New Guinea in coordination with the Hollandia landings. Edwards also featured in the attack on Truk of 29–30 April.

From 12 May to 18 August, Edwards' destroyer division formed the Eastern Marshalls Patrol Group. They patrolled off the Japanese-held atolls of Mili, Jaluit, Maloelap, and Wotje to keep the enemy from receiving assistance or evacuating. On 22 May, she joined Bancroft to put several enemy batteries on Wotje out of action.

Again off Wotje on 27 June, she ignored shore fire to rescue downed aviators drifting toward shore. The rescued aviators were from a Marine F4U Corsair that had crashed into the ocean. A Navy PBY Catalina already had been shot down by Japanese fighter aircraft while attempting to rescue the Marines. In the face of fierce shore fire, a launch boat of six men from Edwards (Lieutenant, junior garde Harold Mann, CPhM Emery Pensak, MoMM1c Andrew Stein Elliott, SM2c John Joseph Crane, Coxswn James Joseph Gonsalves & S1c Richard Stanley) rescued the Marine Corsair aviators without casualty. These six men from the Edwards received the Navy & Marine Corps Medal for their heroism.

After overhaul in Pearl Harbor in August 1944, Edwards reported arrival at San Pedro Bay, Leyte, 30 October for patrol. She joined the assault force for the landings at Ormoc on 7 December. Here the destroyer shot down several attacking aircraft and aided ships they had damaged. A resupply echelon to Ormoc met similar opposition, but drove off the planes and got the convoy through.

On 7 December, near Ormoc Bay, Philippines, Edwards removed casualties from Liddle while being bombed by Japanese planes. Ten minutes later, she shot down three of the Japanese planes. One of three Japanese planes, after being hit while attempting to dive on Edwards, hit her fantail before crashing into the ocean, leaving a 5 ft (1.5 m) section of its wing on her fantail deck.

From 11 to 12 December, Edwards took aboard casualties from Caldwell, which had been set on fire by a Japanese kamikaze. Edwards' commanding officer (Lieutenant Commander Simon Everett Ramey USN) received the Silver Star Medal for this action, but no enlisted personnel were decorated.

On 30 December, a Japanese aircraft dropped a bomb that landed about 50 feet (15 m) short of the ship, skipped above and over the ship between her smoke stacks, and fell into the water on the other side of the ship.

=== 1945 ===
Edwards remained in the Philippines, shepherding supply convoys through to Mindoro, Lingayen Gulf, Polloc Harbor, and Davao Gulf. On 9 May 1945, she arrived at Morotai to take part in the invasion of Borneo, returning to Subic Bay on 12 July. She made one voyage to Iwo Jima, another to Okinawa to escort convoys, then sailed on 16 September for the United States.

=== Post-war ===
On 7 January 1946, Edwards arrived at Charleston, South Carolina, where she was placed out of commission in reserve on 11 April.

Stricken from the Naval Vessel Register on 1 July 1971, Edwards was sold on 25 May 1973 and broken up for scrap.

== Awards ==
Edwards received 14 Battle Stars for her World War II service, a total surpassed by only nine other US ships in World War II.
