= I31 =

I31 or I-31 may refer to:

- Interstate 31, initially proposed as the designation for Interstate 29 between Fargo, North Dakota and the Canada–US border
- Japanese submarine I-31, a Type B1 submarine operated during World War II
