= History of United States Navy ratings =

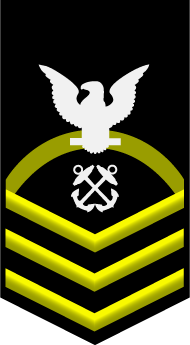
A non-specific rating badge of a Chief Petty Officer. Specific rating icon will normally be shown under the perched eagle (that is a rating badge of a Boatswains Mate).

The History of the United States Navy ratings spans more than 200 years of U.S. history from the United Colonies of the 1775 era to the current age of the 21st century United States Navy. Navy ratings in America were first created in 1775, during the American Revolutionary War, for use by the Continental Navy. After securing independence, the fledgling United States was without an operational Navy for nearly a decade. In 1797, the first three frigates of the United States were formally launched, bringing about new regulations concerning enlisted seaman ratings

== History ==
=== Continental Navy ===
The structure, ranks, and enlisted ratings of the early Continental Navy were direct carryovers from the Royal Navy hierarchy of uniforms, ranks, and insignia. The first American naval ranks consisted of simply captain, lieutenant (navy), and surgeon. Shipboard warrant officers, such as the sailing master, purser, boatswain, gunner, sailmaker, carpenter, and midshipman were also carried over.

The earliest form of U.S. Navy enlisted ratings may be traced to the petty officers who serve as the department heads and mentors to the unrated crew. The oldest such ratings, still in use today, are boatswain's mate, gunner's mates, Master-at-arms, and a cook. There were also ratings of an armourer to maintain the guns and carpenter's mate for members of the ship's carpenter's crew. Additionally there was a coxswain which is still in use as a qualification in the Coast Guard. Informally, the shipboard title of yeoman was also frequently used, even though this would not be an official rating of the United States Navy until 1835.

The remainder of a Continental Navy ship's crew were simply referred to as "seamen", who were "signed on" to the ship for the duration of a campaign and "paid off" once the ship had returned to port. (Note: Not until the 1850s did the U.S. Navy adopt the practice of a permanently assigned ship's company)

=== 21st Century Navy ===
On September 29, 2016, the United States Navy announced a plan to discontinue the enlisted ratings system. Enlisted sailors were to be referred to solely by their rank (e.g. Petty Officer) and would have held a “Navy Operations Specialty (NOS)“ instead of a rating. However, in December of that year, the Navy halted the creation of the proposed NOS, and reinstated the ratings system with immediate effect.
