= Decatur Island =

Island of the San Juan Islands in northwest Washington, United States

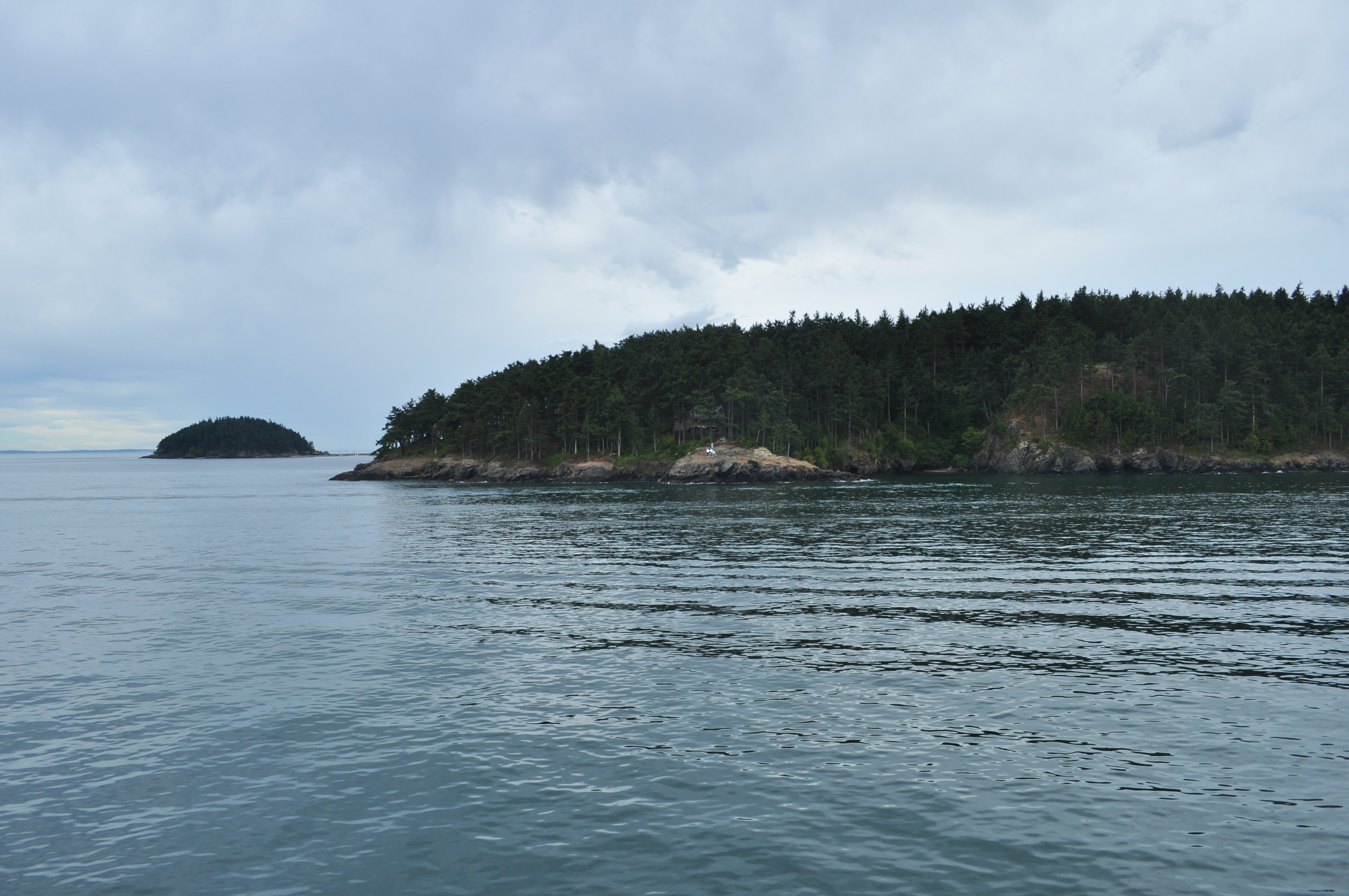
- Decatur Island in the foreground, James Island in the distance

- Location of Decatur Island within the San Juan Islands

- Location of Decatur Island in the state of Washington

Geography
- Location: Pacific Northwest
- Coordinates: 48.510236°N 122.810926°W
- Archipelago: San Juan Islands
- Area: 3.524 sq mi (9.13 km^{2})

Administration
- United States
- State: Washington
- County: San Juan County

Demographics
- Population: 71 (2020)

Decatur Island is one of the San Juan Islands in Washington state, USA. Located just east of Lopez Island across Lopez Sound and just south of Blakely Island across Thatcher Pass, it is 3.524 square miles (9.127 km²) in area, and was named by the Wilkes Expedition in 1841 for naval officer Stephen Decatur.

== History ==
A post office called Decatur was established in 1891, and remained in operation until 1969.

There is a one-room school for kindergarten through eighth grade. The 2020 census reported a resident population of 71 persons.

== Parks and recreation ==
There is a private nine-hole rustic golf course, Memorial Day to Labor Day there is a farmer's market each Saturday at the country store. James Island State Park is just to the east of the island.

== Infrastructure ==
There are no public facilities other than one public boat ramp in Davis Bay on the east side of the island. The San Juan Preservation Trust allows public day-use of their property on the southern tip of the island.

There is no Washington State Ferry service to Decatur; access is by private boat or plane. The airport on Decatur Island is private, for residents of the Decatur Shores community only. All other persons wishing to use the airport must obtain prior permission from the community. Paraclete Charter Service and Island Express Charters provide passenger-only ferry service to Decatur from Anacortes. Northwest Sky Ferry provides air service from Bellingham, Washington. Island Transport operates a ferry/barge, transporting cargo and vehicles from Skyline Marina in Anacortes to the public boat ramp.
