= USS Wiley =

Fletcher-class destroyer

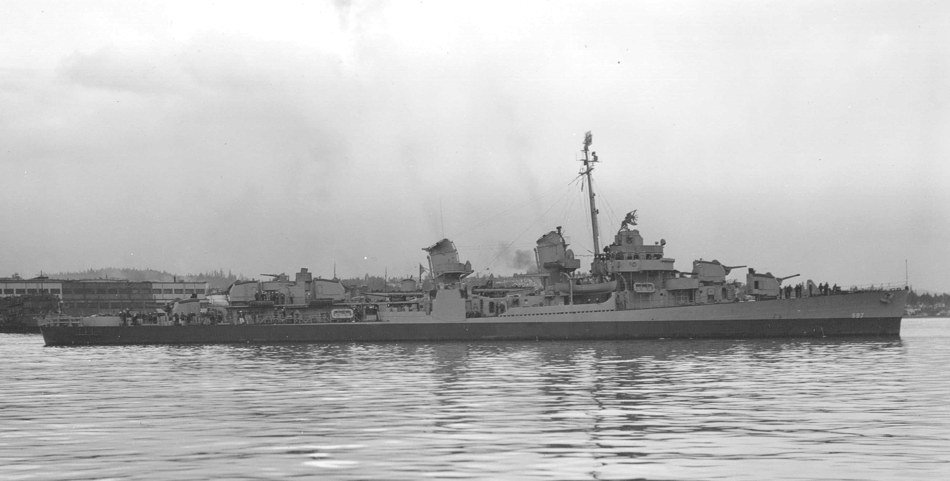
- USS Wiley (DD-597) 1945

History

United States
- Namesake: William Wiley
- Builder: Puget Sound Navy Yard
- Laid down: 10 August 1943
- Launched: 25 September 1944
- Commissioned: 22 February 1945
- Decommissioned: 15 May 1946
- Stricken: 1 May 1968
- Fate: Sold for scrap, 2 April 1970

General characteristics
- Class & type: Fletcher-class destroyer
- Displacement: 2,050 tons
- Length: 376 ft 6 in (114.7 m)
- Beam: 39 ft 8 in (12.1 m)
- Draft: 17 ft 9 in (5.4 m)
- Propulsion: 60,000 shp (45 MW); 2 propellers
- Speed: 35 knots (65 km/h; 40 mph)
- Range: 6500 nmi. (12,000 km); at 15 kt
- Complement: 329
- Armament: 5 × 5 in (130 mm) guns; 4 × 40 mm AA guns; 4 × 20 mm AA guns; 10 × 21 inch (533 mm) torpedo tubes; 6 × depth charge projectors; 2 × depth charge tracks

USS Wiley (DD-597), was a Fletcher-class destroyer of the United States Navy.

== Namesake ==
William Wiley was a sailor who served in the First Barbary War. Besides a few details of his service in the Navy, little is known of the life of William Wiley. He entered the Navy on 2 April 1803 and was assigned to the schooner USS Enterprise in the Mediterranean Squadron. After attaining the rates of boatswain, boatswain's mate, and then a reduction to quartermaster, Wiley took part in the daring raid led by Lieutenant Stephen Decatur, Jr., in the ketch USS Intrepid at Tripoli harbor on 16 February 1804, destroying the frigate USS Philadelphia which had been captured by the Tripolitean pirates. Quartermaster Wiley was transferred to the brig USS Scourge soon thereafter, and this is where his documentary trail ends.

== Construction and commissioning ==
Wiley (DD-597) was laid down on 10 August 1943 at Bremerton, Wash., by the Puget Sound Navy Yard; launched on 25 September 1944; sponsored by Mrs. Herbert V. Wiley, wife of Vice Admiral Herbert V. Wiley, USN (Ret.); and commissioned there on 22 February 1945.

== History ==
The destroyer conducted shakedown out of San Diego, Calif., through the end of April 1945; underwent post-shakedown availability at Puget Sound; and then sailed for the Hawaiian Islands, departing Port Angeles on 19 May and arriving at Pearl Harbor on the 26th. She trained in the vicinity of Oahu for three weeks before getting underway on 13 June to escort the escort carrier USS Cape Gloucester to the Philippines.

Arriving at Leyte on 13 July and in Subic Bay on the 15th, Wiley operated out of the Philippines on training exercises through the first week of August. The ship departed Subic Bay on 9 August and escorted a small group of tankers to the Ryukyus. Within a week, Japan capitulated, ending the war in the Pacific.

Wiley subsequently joined the North China force in operations off the coast of Asia, while Chinese communist and Nationalist forces fought for supremacy in the strategic northern provinces once occupied by the Japanese. Over the next three months, this peacekeeping duty took the destroyer to Dalian, Port Arthur, Yantai, Qingdao, and Qinhuangdao. The ship destroyed floating Japanese mines with gunfire and screened the cruisers of Cruiser Division 6. On 8 September, Wiley covered the landings of a peacekeeping force of American troops at Jinsen, Korea.

Detached from this duty with the cruisers, Wiley joined a fast carrier task force on 12 October for operations in the Gulf of Bohai. During the latter part of October, the destroyer served in the screen for the aircraft carriers USS Antietam and USS Boxer and served as plane guard for the carriers while they conducted routine flight operations over the Yellow Sea. Detached from this duty on 18 November, Wiley joined USS San Francisco at anchor off Taku. Four days later, Wiley shifted to Jinsen, took on board passengers and mail, and proceeded to Shanghai, Qingdao, and Taku, disembarking some of her passengers at each port before returning to Jinsen on 30 November.

Wiley remained in the Far East into December and then sailed, via Guam, Eniwetok, and Pearl Harbor, for the United States. After arriving at San Francisco, Calif., on 3 January 1946, Wiley received her inactivation orders on 11 March and put into San Diego the next day.

== Fate ==
Decommissioned and placed in reserve on 15 May 1946, Wiley remained berthed at San Diego until struck from the Navy list on 1 May 1968. She was sold to the National Metal and Steel Corporation, Terminal Island, Los Angeles, California, on 2 April 1970 and subsequently scrapped.
