= James Island (San Juan Islands) =

Island of the San Juan Islands in Washington state, United States

James Island Marine State Park
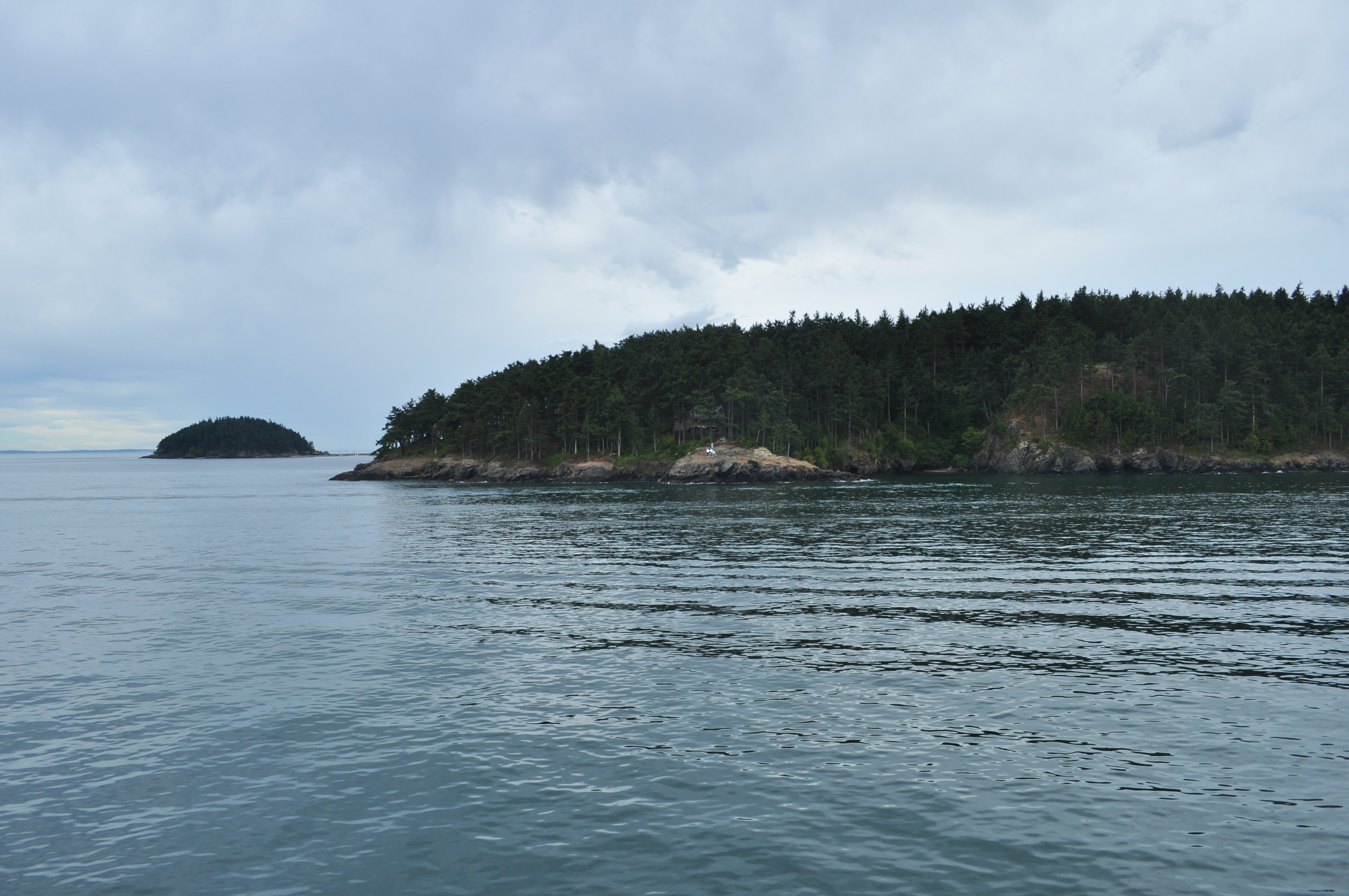
- James Island (left) behind Decatur Island (foreground right)

- Location within Washington (state) Location within the United States
- Location: San Juan County, Washington, United States
- Coordinates: 48°30′45″N 122°46′30″W
- Area: 113 acres (46 ha)
- Elevation: 75 ft (23 m)
- Established: 1964
- Administrator: Washington State Parks and Recreation Commission
- Website: Official website

James Island is one of the San Juan Islands in San Juan County, Washington, United States. It lies in Rosario Strait just off the eastern shore of Decatur Island and west of the city of Anacortes. The entire island comprises James Island Marine State Park of the Washington State Park System. It has a land area of 113 acres (46 ha) with 12,335 feet (3,760 m) of saltwater shoreline. The island has no potable water or residents. It has three different camping areas, each with at least one toilet. The camping areas combine for a total of 13 campsites and are connected by a loop trail. James Island was named by Charles Wilkes in 1841 to commemorate the naval hero Reuben James. The property was transferred from the federal government to the Washington State Parks and Recreation Commission in 1964.
