= USS Bainbridge (DD-246) =

Clemson-class destroyer

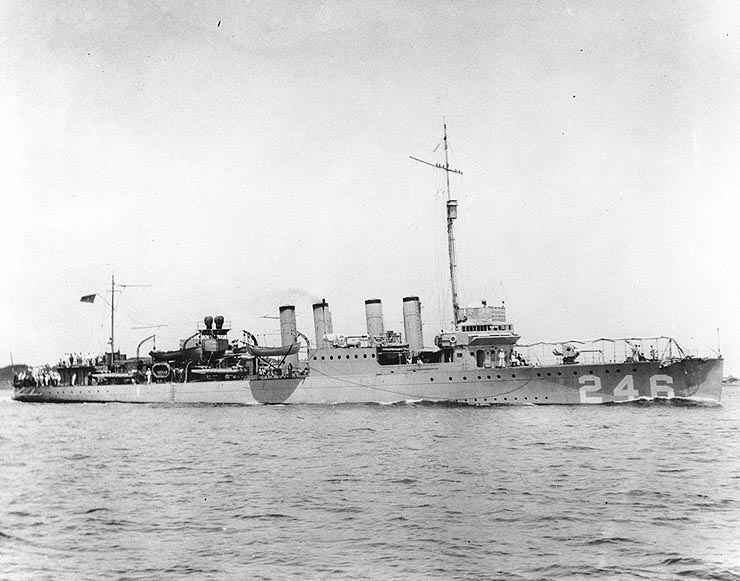
- USS Bainbridge (DD-246)

History

United States
- Name: USS Bainbridge
- Namesake: William Bainbridge
- Builder: New York Shipbuilding
- Laid down: 27 May 1919
- Launched: 12 June 1920
- Sponsored by: Miss Juliet Edith Greene
- Commissioned: 9 February 1921
- Decommissioned: 23 December 1930
- Recommissioned: 9 March 1932 (reduced); 5 September 1933 (full)
- Decommissioned: 20 November 1937
- Recommissioned: 26 September 1939
- Decommissioned: 21 July 1945
- Stricken: November 1945
- Fate: Sold 30 November 1945; Scrapped

General characteristics
- Class & type: Clemson-class destroyer
- Displacement: 1,216 tons
- Length: 314 feet 4 inches (95.81 m)
- Beam: 31 feet 8 inches (9.65 m)
- Draft: 9 feet 10 inches (3.00 m)
- Propulsion: 26,500 shp (20 MW); geared turbines, 2 screws
- Speed: 35 knots (65 km/h)
- Range: 4,900 nautical miles (9,100 kilometres); @ 15 kt
- Complement: 137 officers and enlisted
- Armament: 4 × 4 in (102 mm)/50 guns, 1 × 3 in (76 mm)/25 gun, 12 × 21 inch (533 mm) torpedo tubes

The third USS Bainbridge (DD-246) was a United States Navy Clemson-class destroyer in commission from 1921 to 1930, from 1932 to 1937, and from 1939 to 1945. She served during World War II. She was named for Commodore William Bainbridge, who served in the War of 1812 and the First and Second Barbary Wars.

== Construction and commissioning ==
Bainbridge was launched on 12 June 1920 by New York Shipbuilding Corporation at Camden, New Jersey, sponsored by Miss Juliet Edith Greene, great-great-granddaughter of Commodore Bainbridge. Bainbridge was commissioned on 9 February 1921 with Lieutenant Commander Leo H. Thebaud in command.

== Service history ==
=== 1921–1930 ===
After commissioning, Bainbridge reported to the United States Atlantic Fleet. She operated along the United States East Coast and in the Caribbean with the fleet, carrying out tactical exercises and maneuvers until October 1922. She departed for Constantinople to join the Naval Detachment in Turkish waters. On 16 December 1922 she rescued approximately 500 survivors of the burning French military transport Vinh-Long about 10 nautical miles (19 km; 12 mi) off Constantinople. For extraordinary heroism during the rescue Lieutenant Commander Walter A. Edwards received the Medal of Honor.

In 1923, at Newport, Rhode Island, Bainbridge served temporarily as flagship of Commander, Scouting Fleet. She then joined Squadron 14, Scouting Fleet, in the Atlantic Fleet.

Between 1923 and 1928 Bainbridge participated in annual fleet concentrations, tactical and joint maneuvers, and fleet and destroyer competitions. In 1927 she was assigned temporary duty with the Special Service Squadron for patrol duty off Nicaragua during internal disturbances there. During several summers Bainbridge participated in the training program of the Scouting Fleet, making summer cruises with reservists. On 23 December 1930 she was placed out of commission in reserve at Philadelphia, Pennsylvania.

=== 1932–1937 ===
On 9 March 1932 Bainbridge was placed in reduced commission and attached to Rotating Reserve Division 19, taking part in United States Naval Reserve training cruises. She was placed in full commission on 5 September 1933 and assigned to Destroyer Division 8, Scouting Force. For a short period she served with the Special Service Squadron in the Florida Keys and at Guantanamo Bay Naval Base at Guantánamo Bay, Cuba, and later was assigned to the Pacific, arriving at San Diego, California, on 5 November 1934. While serving on the United States West Coast, Bainbridge made cruises to British Columbia in Canada, then Alaska, and Hawaii. She was placed out of commission in reserve at San Diego on 20 November 1937.

=== 1939–1941 ===
Recommissioned on 26 September 1939 Bainbridge was assigned to Division 62 and operated on the Neutrality Patrol in the Panama Canal Zone until the summer of 1940 when she reported to Key West, Florida, for patrol duty. During the early part of 1941 she cruised along the northeast coast and between May and November 1941 made three convoy escort voyages to Newfoundland and Iceland.

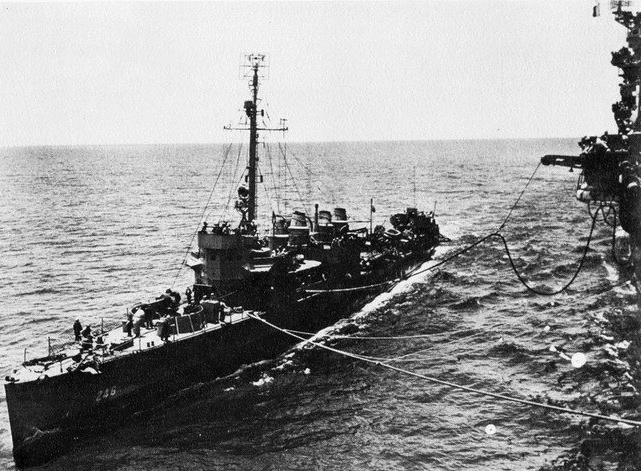
Bainbridge refueling from the aircraft carrier USS Hancock (CV-19) in 1944.

=== World War II ===
The United States entered World War II with the Japanese attack on Pearl Harbor on 7 December 1941. Between December 1941 and July 1945 Bainbridge operated as a convoy escort in the waters off the U.S. East and Gulf Coasts and in the Caribbean with the exception of five trans-Atlantic escort crossings to North Africa between February and December 1943.

== Convoys escorted ==
Convoy	Escort Group	Dates	Notes
HX 155		18–25 October 1941	52 ships escorted without loss from Newfoundland to Iceland prior to US declaration of war
ON 31		4–15 November 1941	37 ships escorted without loss from Iceland to Newfoundland prior to US declaration of war
HX 168		4–10 January 1942	36 ships escorted without loss from Newfoundland to Iceland
ON 57		24 January-7 February 1942	15 ships escorted without loss from Iceland to Newfoundland
AT 33		6 January 1943	escorted Empress of Scotland out of New York City with 4,191 troops bound for England
UGS 5A		18–21 February 1943	16 ships escorted without loss from Chesapeake Bay to Mediterranean Sea
GUS 9		9–15 July 1943	43 ships escorted without loss from Mediterranean Sea to Chesapeake Bay
UGS 16		27 August-7 September 1943	79 ships escorted without loss from Chesapeake Bay to Mediterranean Sea
GUS 15		21–27 September 1943	37 ships escorted without loss from Mediterranean Sea to Chesapeake Bay
UGS 22		25–30 October 1943	64 ships escorted without loss from Chesapeake Bay to Mediterranean Sea

== Decommissioning and disposal ==
World War II ended in Europe on 8 May 1945. Commencing her inactivation on 1 July 1945, Bainbridge was decommissioned on 21 July 1945 at Philadelphia and sold on 30 November 1945.

== Honors and awards ==
- Second Nicaraguan Campaign Medal
- American Defense Service Medal
- European–African–Middle Eastern Campaign Medal with one battle star
- World War II Victory Medal

Bainbridge received one battle star for her service as a convoy escort between 13 June and August 1943.
