= USS Frazier =

Benson-class destroyer

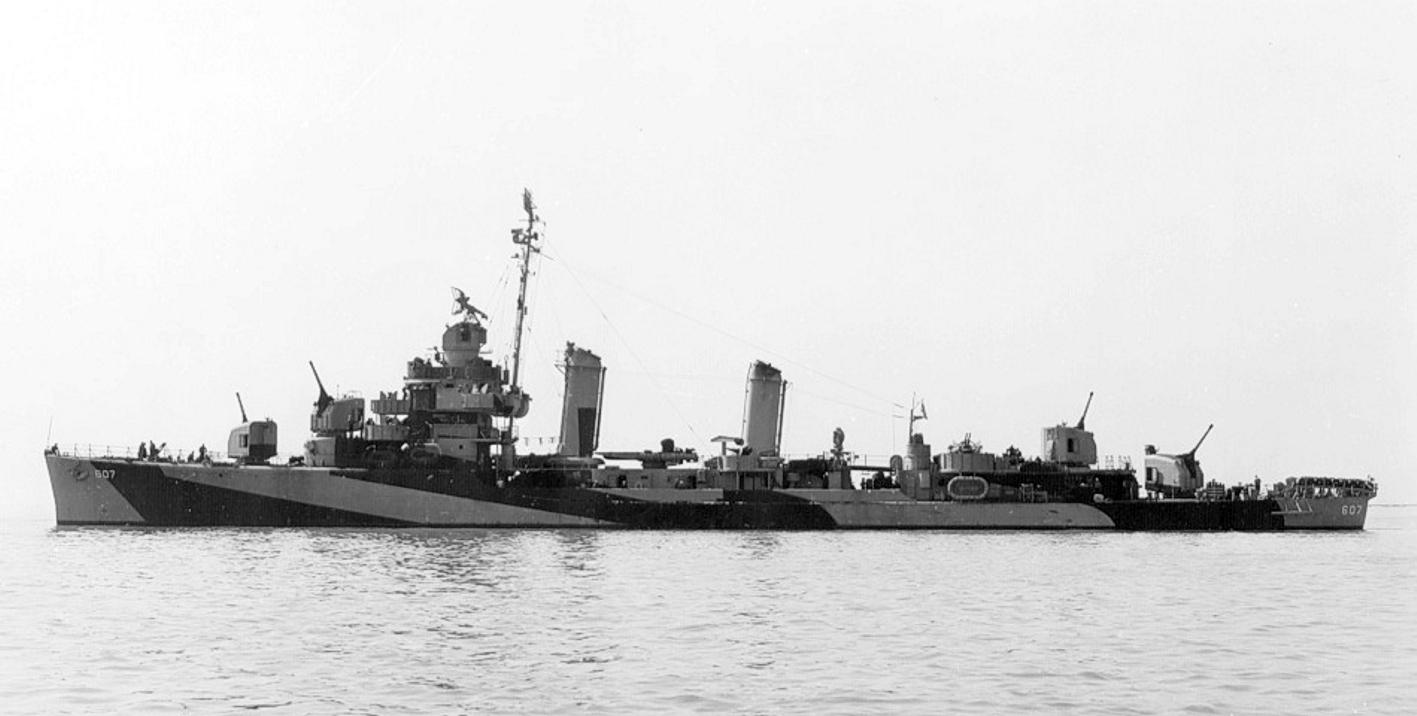
- USS Frazier (DD-607) off the Mare Island Naval Shipyard, California, on 20 September 1944

History

United States
- Name: USS Frazier (DD-607)
- Namesake: Daniel Frazier
- Builder: Bethlehem Shipbuilding Corporation, San Francisco, California
- Launched: 17 March 1942
- Commissioned: 30 July 1942
- Decommissioned: 15 April 1946
- Stricken: 1 July 1971
- Fate: Sold for scrap, 6 October 1972

General characteristics
- Class & type: Benson-class destroyer
- Displacement: 1,620 tons
- Length: 348 ft 4 in (106.17 m)
- Beam: 36 ft 1 in (11.00 m)
- Draught: 17 ft 4 in (5.28 m)
- Installed power: 50,000 hp (37,000 kW)
- Propulsion: Four Babcock & Wilcox boilers, Westinghouse geared turbines
- Speed: 37.5 kn (69.5 km/h) maximum, 33 kn (61 km/h) full load
- Range: 6,000 nmi (11,000 km) at 15 kn (28 km/h); (452 tons oil fuel)
- Complement: 191 (peace), 276 (war)
- Armament: 4 x 5" (127 mm)/38 caliber, 4x1.1" (28 mm) AA (1x4), 6x0.5" (12.7mm)/63¾ caliber AA, 7x20 mm AA, 5 x 21 inch (533 mm) torpedo tubes (1x5), 4 dcp., 2 dct.

USS Frazier (DD-607) was a Benson-class destroyer in the United States Navy during World War II.

== Namesake ==
Daniel Frazier was born James North in Dorchester County, Maryland, and joined the United States Navy in 1802. Serving as a quartermaster aboard the USS Enterprise in the Mediterranean Sea during the First Barbary War, he took part in Stephen Decatur's renowned foray into Tripoli harbor to destroy the captured USS Philadelphia and was again with Decatur in the attack on Tripoli on 3 August 1804. After boarding a Tripolitan gunboat, Decatur was locked in hand-to-hand combat with its commander. Another enemy sailor raised his sword against Decatur, but the blow was intercepted by Frazier, who suffered a head wound. Though this act of bravery has historically also been attributed to Frazier's shipmate Reuben James, modern scholars agree that Frazier was Decatur's savior. Frazier suffered severe wounds during the battle, and began drawing a naval pension in 1805. He died in New York City about 22 April 1833.

== Construction and commissioning ==
Frazier was launched 17 March 1942 by Bethlehem Steel Corporation, San Francisco, California; sponsored by Mrs. Richard McCullough; and commissioned 30 July 1942, Lieutenant Commander Frank Virden in command.

== 1942 and 1943 ==
Frazier arrived at Noumea, New Caledonia, 9 December 1942 in the escort for a group of troop transports. She served on escort and patrol in the South Pacific for the next 4 months, guarding transports to Guadalcanal, patrolling off Espiritu Santo, and covering escort carriers as they patrolled the waters between Efate and the Solomon Islands. On 18 March 1943, Frazier departed Efate bound for Pearl Harbor and a rendezvous with a task force assigned to operate in the Aleutian Islands.

After firing in the preinvasion bombardment, Frazier covered the landings on Attu 11 May 1943, and patrolled off that island and Kiska, Alaska. On 12 May, she sighted two periscopes and opened gunfire on I-31 who dived quickly but not before Frazier had scored hits on the periscopes. Immediately gaining sonar contact, the destroyer began a depth charge attack which brought air bubbles, oil, and debris to the surface. Two more attacks ensured the submarine was sunk.

Early in the foggy morning of 10 June, with Lieutenant Commander Elliot M. Brown in command, she made two separate attacks on radar contacts which were believed to be submarines. In the second attack, the destroyer's guns fired for five minutes as she pursued her target until its radar echo merged with land echo of Kiska. Late that night and again on the morning of 11 June, Frazier dropped depth charges on two different underwater contacts, but was unable to determine the results of these attacks; it is likely she sank I-9 in one of them.

On 2 and 12 August, she fired shore bombardment on Kiska, then covered the unopposed landings of 15 August. She continued to screen large combatants in the Aleutians until early September, when she began a brief overhaul at Puget Sound.

Frazier sailed to Wellington, New Zealand, to join the escort for transports assigned to the Gilbert Islands operation. Between 7 and 13 November 1943 the group rehearsed at Efate, then sailed on to Tarawa, where Frazier provided preassault bombardment and call-fire support to the troops landed 20 November. Patrolling off Betio, on 22 November, Frazier joined Meade in attacking I-35. After the two destroyers had depth-charged I-35 to the surface, they attacked it with gunfire, and Frazier finally sent her to the bottom by ramming. Her bow was badly damaged, but none of her men was injured. Two days later, she sailed for repairs and training at Pearl Harbor.

== 1944 ==
Frazier sortied from Pearl Harbor 22 January 1944 for the invasion of the Marshall Islands. She bombarded Taroa and Maloelap on 30 January, and next screened San Francisco as the cruiser bombarded targets on Kwajalein, while the landings were made. After patrolling against submarines off Kwajalein, Frazier returned to Pearl Harbor 15 February screening unladen transports. Between 28 February and 20 March, the destroyer carried out escort and patrol assignments in the Marshalls, then joined the fast carrier task force to screen during the air raids on the Palaus, Yap, Ulithi, and Woleai from 30 March to 1 April.

Returning to Majuro 6 April 1944, Frazier sailed a week later with a fast carrier task group for attacks on Wakde Airfield and Sawar Airfield in Western New Guinea, on 21 and 22 April, to neutralize the danger of air attack on the Landing at Aitape and the Battle of Hollandia. The task group also struck at targets in the Caroline Islands as it sailed back to arrive at Kwajalein 4 May. From 10 May to 27 July, Frazier patrolled the bypassed Japanese-held islands in the Marshalls, which included Wotje, Jaluit, and Mille. She bombarded Mille on 26 May, and on 9 June sent her motor whale-boat in under the guns of Taroa to rescue 10 survivors of a flying boat previously sent in to rescue a downed aviator and were stranded when their plane was damaged by a shore battery. Two weeks later she rescued two Marine aviators off Mille.

A west coast overhaul and training at Pearl Harbor preceded Frazier's assignment to escort duty out of Ulithi between 15 December 1944 and the close of the year. On 6 January 1945, the destroyer arrived in San Pedro Bay, from which she sailed the next day for the invasion of Lingayen Gulf. From the day of the landings, 9 January, until 26 February, Frazier carried out bombardment, gunfire support, patrol, and escort missions all around Luzon, taking part in the bombardment of Corregidor on 16 February. After replenishing at San Pedro Bay, Frazier returned to escort and fire support duties in the Manila area, covered the landings at Mindanao in mid-March, and patrolled against submarines between Lingayen Gulf and Subic Bay on 10 May.

== 1945, end of World War II and fate ==
Sailing from San Pedro Bay 13 May 1945, Frazier arrived at Morotai 2 days later, and based here for the Borneo operation. She took part in the invasions of Brunei Bay and Balikpapan, and escorted support convoys to the assault areas until returning to Subic Bay 29 July for training.

Assigned to the Philippine Sea Frontier for escort duty at the close of the war, she made voyages to Okinawa and Japan until 3 November, when she sailed for Boston, Massachusetts and Charleston, South Carolina. There Frazier was decommissioned and placed in reserve 15 April 1946. She was stricken from the Naval Vessel Register on 1 July 1971 and sold for scrap on 6 October 1972.

== Awards ==
Frazier received 12 battle stars for World War II service.

As of 2009, no other ship in the United States Navy has been named Frazier.
