= Reuben James =

United States Navy boatswain's mate and war hero

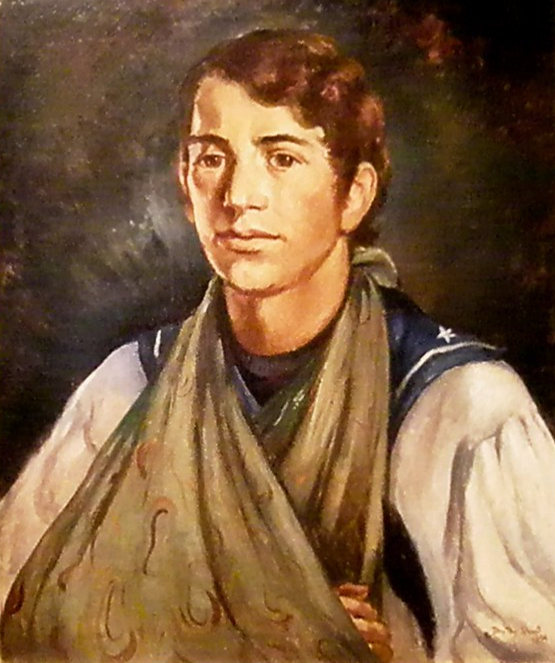
- James, wounded after battle in Tripoli, as painted by Dorothy Short (1944)
- Born: c. 1776; Delaware
- Died: December 3, 1838 (aged 61–62); Washington, D.C., U.S.
- Military career
- Allegiance: United States of America
- Branch: United States Navy
- Service years: c. 1790s–1836
- Rank: Boatswain's mate
- Conflicts: Quasi-War; First Barbary War; War of 1812; Second Barbary War

Reuben James (c. 1776 – December 3, 1838) was an American sailor who served as a boatswain's mate in the United States Navy. He is best known for purportedly saving the life of his commanding officer, Stephen Decatur, during the First Barbary War in 1804, though most historians agree he was wrongly credited for the actions of shipmate Daniel Frazier.

== Biography ==
James was born in Delaware around 1776. By 1799, he was serving in the United States Navy aboard the frigate USS Constellation during the Quasi-War with France, participating in the victories over L'Insurgente and La Vengeance. During the First Barbary War, James was serving aboard the USS Enterprise when the frigate USS Philadelphia was captured by Barbary pirates after running aground near Tripoli, Libya.

On August 3, 1804, during the naval blockade of Tripoli, Lieutenant Stephen Decatur led a boarding party onto a Tripolitan gunboat that he believed was crewed by the men who had feigned surrender before mortally wounding his brother. While a wounded Decatur was locked in combat with the Tripolitan commander, another enemy sailor swung his sword at him. The Tripolitan's blow was intercepted by a sailor in Decatur's party who had sacrificed himself, suffering a head wound as a result.

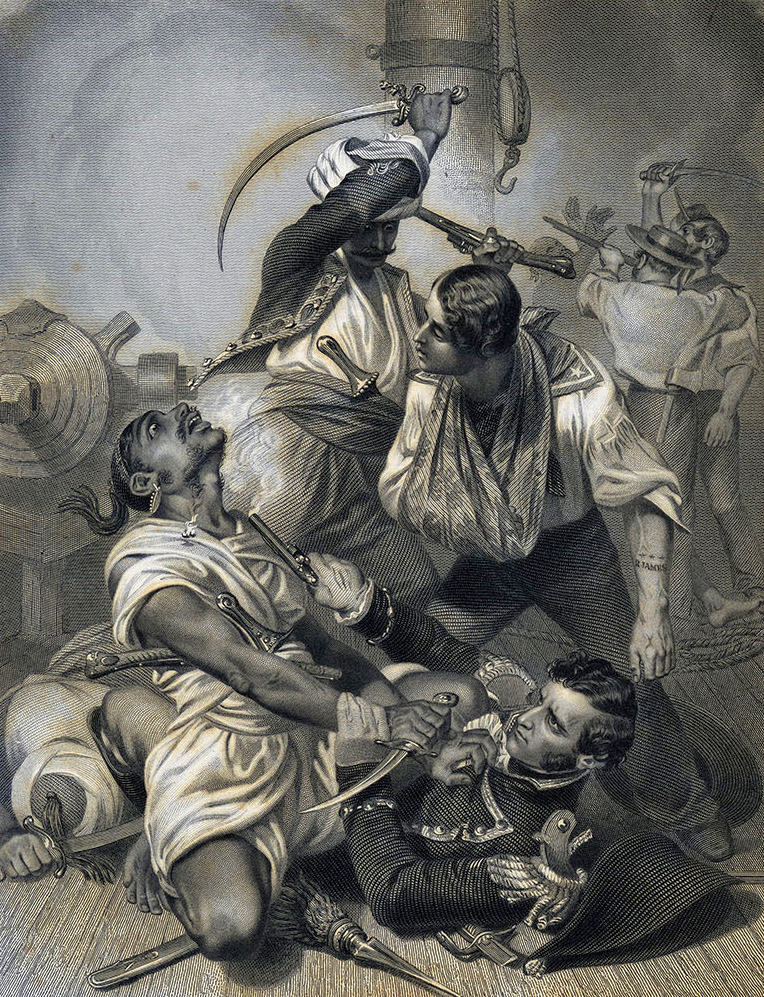
Reuben James Interposing His Head to Save the Life of His Commander, an 1857 engraving by Alonzo Chappel. Note the "R. James" tattoo on James's forearm.

Many traditional accounts credit James with saving Decatur's life, while modern scholarship credits Quartermaster Daniel Frazier. (Note: In 1924, Charles Lee Lewis wrote that A. S. Mackenzie's Life of Stephen Decatur (1846) was the first work to attribute James as Decatur's savior, though even Mackenzie acknowledged that "Some have said this noble act of self-devotion was performed by Daniel Frazier, which left the name of the individual somewhat uncertain." Previous to Mackenzie, several authors, such as Thomas Clark (1814), S. Putnam Waldo (1822), and James Fenimore Cooper (1839) simply attributed the heroism to one of Decatur's crew. In Charles W. Goldsborough's Naval Chronicle (1824), he names Frazier as the hero.) As late as 1865, Rear Admiral Charles Stewart, a friend of Decatur's, said that "...Reuben James, a sailor, thrust out his arm and had it cleaved off by the blade of the weapon intended for his commander." Yet James was one of the few Americans to survive the battle uninjured, while Dr. Lewis Heermann, the surgeon aboard the Enterprise, described Frazier's injuries as "two incised wounds on the head, one of them severe; one bad wound across the wrist, and seven slightly about his hands." W. M. P. Dunne, writing for Naval History magazine, calls James taking the blow meant for Decatur "a myth." In 1937, Lieutenant Commander R. C. Bartman wrote that James and Frazier "each might be worthy of recognition without detracting from the other." Both men have had U.S. Navy ships named for them.

After the Barbary War, James continued his naval career, serving under Decatur during the War of 1812 aboard the USS United States, participating in its capture of the HMS Macedonian. James later served aboard the USS President, and was taken prisoner when that vessel was captured by the British in January 1815. Later that year, he saw action in the Second Barbary War, sailing with Decatur in the fleet that captured the Algerian flagship Mashouda. Declining health forced his retirement in 1836, and an old musket ball wound necessitated the amputation of a leg. James died on December 3, 1838 at the U.S. Naval Hospital in Washington, D.C.

== Honors ==
Three United States Navy ships have been named the USS Reuben James:

- Reuben James (DD-245), (1919–1941), a Clemson-class destroyer
- Reuben James (DE-153), (1942–1971), a Buckley-class destroyer escort
- Reuben James (FFG-57), (1983–2017), an Oliver Hazard Perry-class frigate

James Island in Washington state is also named for James.

== In literature ==
An 1895 poem by James Jeffrey Roche, "Reuben James," chronicles the sailor's exploits in Tripoli. Similarly, in Reuben James: A Hero of the Forecastle, a 1906 novel by Cyrus Townsend Brady, James is again portrayed as Decatur's savior.
