= Japanese submarine I-31 =

Type B cruiser submarine (1941–43)

Coordinates: 52.542°N 172.177°E

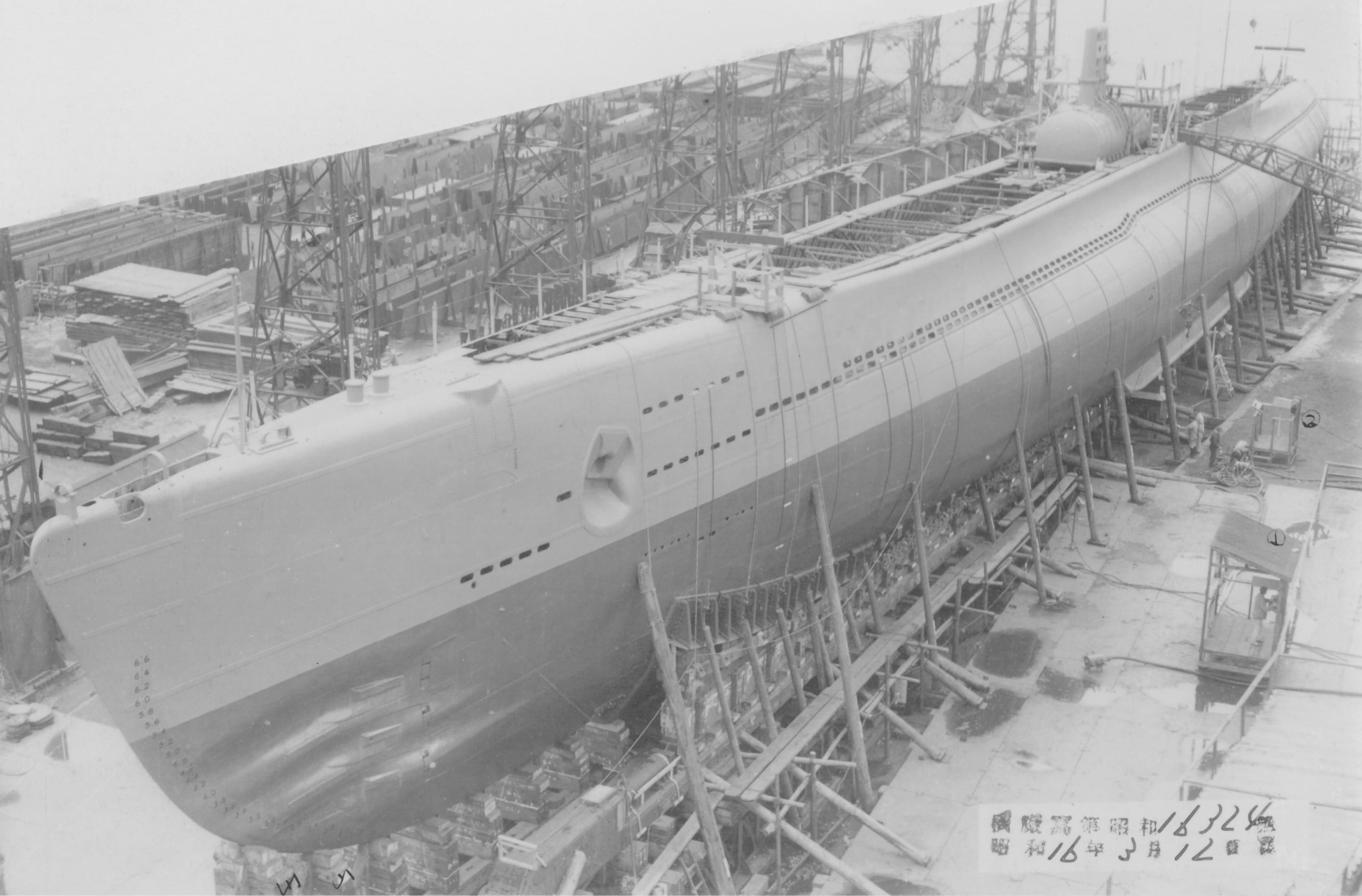
- I-31 one day before launching, 12 March 1941

History

Empire of Japan
- Name: I-31
- Builder: Yokosuka Naval Yard
- Laid down: 6 December 1939
- Launched: 13 March 1941
- Completed: 30 May 1942
- Fate: Sunk, 13 May 1943

General characteristics
- Class & type: Type B1 submarine
- Displacement: 2,631 tonnes (2,589 long tons) surfaced; 3,713 tonnes (3,654 long tons) submerged
- Length: 108.7 m (356 ft 8 in) overall
- Beam: 9.3 m (30 ft 6 in)
- Draft: 5.1 m (16 ft 9 in)
- Installed power: 12,400 bhp (9,200 kW) (diesel); 2,000 hp (1,500 kW) (electric motor)
- Propulsion: Diesel-electric; 2 × diesel engine; 2 × electric motor
- Speed: 23.5 knots (43.5 km/h; 27.0 mph) surfaced; 8 knots (15 km/h; 9.2 mph) submerged
- Range: 14,000 nmi (26,000 km; 16,000 mi) at 16 knots (30 km/h; 18 mph) surfaced; 96 nmi (178 km; 110 mi) at 3 knots (5.6 km/h; 3.5 mph) submerged
- Test depth: 100 m (330 ft)
- Crew: 94
- Armament: 6 × bow 533 mm (21 in) torpedo tubes; 1 × 14 cm (5.5 in) deck gun; 2 × single 25 mm (1 in) Type 96 anti-aircraft guns
- Aircraft carried: 1 × floatplane
- Aviation facilities: 1 × catapult

The Japanese submarine I-31 was one of 20 Type B cruiser submarines of the B1 sub-class built for the Imperial Japanese Navy (IJN) during the 1940s.

== Design and description ==
The Type B submarines were derived from the earlier KD6 sub-class of the Kaidai class and were equipped with an aircraft to enhance their scouting ability. They displaced 2,631 tonnes (2,589 long tons) surfaced and 3,713 tonnes (3,654 long tons) submerged. The submarines were 108.7 meters (356 ft 8 in) long, had a beam of 9.3 meters (30 ft 6 in) and a draft of 5.1 meters (16 ft 9 in). They had a diving depth of 100 meters (330 ft).

For surface running, the boats were powered by two 6,200-brake-horsepower (4,623 kW) diesel engines, each driving one propeller shaft. When submerged each propeller was driven by a 1,000-horsepower (746 kW) electric motor. They could reach 23.6 knots (43.7 km/h; 27.2 mph) on the surface and 8 knots (15 km/h; 9.2 mph) underwater. On the surface, the B1s had a range of 14,000 nautical miles (26,000 km; 16,000 mi) at 16 knots (30 km/h; 18 mph); submerged, they had a range of 96 nmi (178 km; 110 mi) at 3 knots (5.6 km/h; 3.5 mph).

The boats were armed with six internal bow 53.3 cm (21.0 in) torpedo tubes and carried a total of 17 torpedoes. They were also armed with a single 140 mm (5.5 in)/40 deck gun and two single mounts for 25 mm (1 in) Type 96 anti-aircraft guns. In the Type Bs, the aircraft hangar was faired into the base of the conning tower. A single catapult was positioned on the forward deck.

== Career ==
In November 1942, I-31 was spotted doing reconnaissance with its seaplane off Suva, Fiji.

On 12 May 1943 I-31 attacked the USS Pennsylvania and the USS Santa Fe (CL-60) with torpedoes nine miles northeast of Holtz Bay, all missed. On 12 May 1943, near Holtz Bay, Attu, her periscope was sighted by American destroyers, Edwards and Frazier, who immediately opened fire. I-31 dove quickly but not before Edwards scored hits. The destroyers quickly made sonar contact and began a series of depth charge attacks until, after surviving for 10 hours, she was sunk by Frazier on 13 May.
