= Serang (disambiguation) =

Serang is a city in Indonesia.

Serang may also refer to:

- Serang Regency, a regency within Banten Province of Indonesia, and surrounding both Serang city and Cilegon city on their landward sides
- Serang, Central Java, a village within Central Java Province in Indonesia
- Seram Island, in Indonesia
- Serang River, a river on Java
- The boatswain or senior engine room rating of a lascar ship's crew
- Selangor Young People Secretariat (SERANG), the abbreviation for or in Malay: Sekretariat Orang Muda Selangor, a non-governmental organization (NGO) in Malaysia

== See also ==
- Sarang (disambiguation)
