= USS Reuben James (FFG-57) =

Oliver Hazard Perry-class frigate

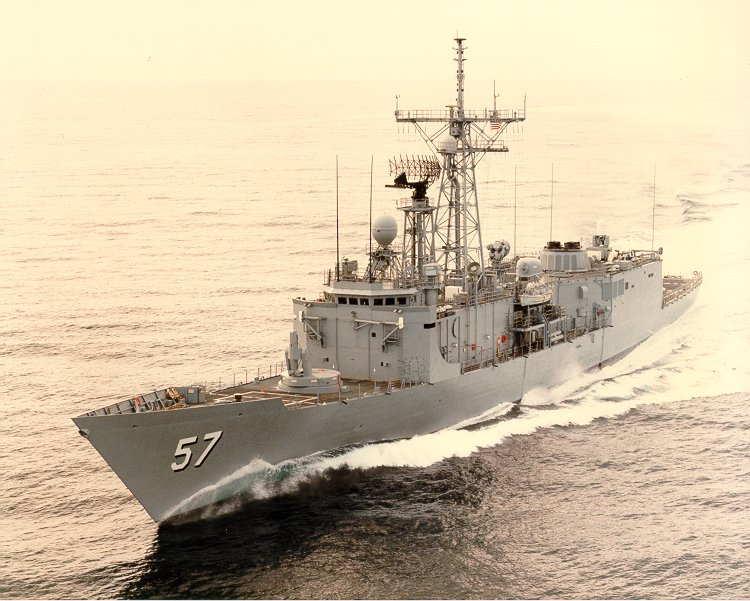
- USS Reuben James (FFG-57), Pacific Ocean, port bow view, 5 November 1985.

History

United States
- Name: Reuben James
- Namesake: Boatswain's Mate Reuben James
- Awarded: 22 March 1982
- Builder: Todd Pacific Shipyards, Los Angeles Division, San Pedro, California
- Laid down: 19 November 1983
- Launched: 8 February 1985
- Sponsored by: Lois Haight Herrington
- Commissioned: 22 March 1986
- Decommissioned: 18 July 2013
- Stricken: 18 January 2016
- Identification: Hull symbol:FFG-57; Code letters:NNRJ
- Motto: "Back with a Vengeance"
- Fate: Sunk as target 18 January 2016 by USS John Paul Jones
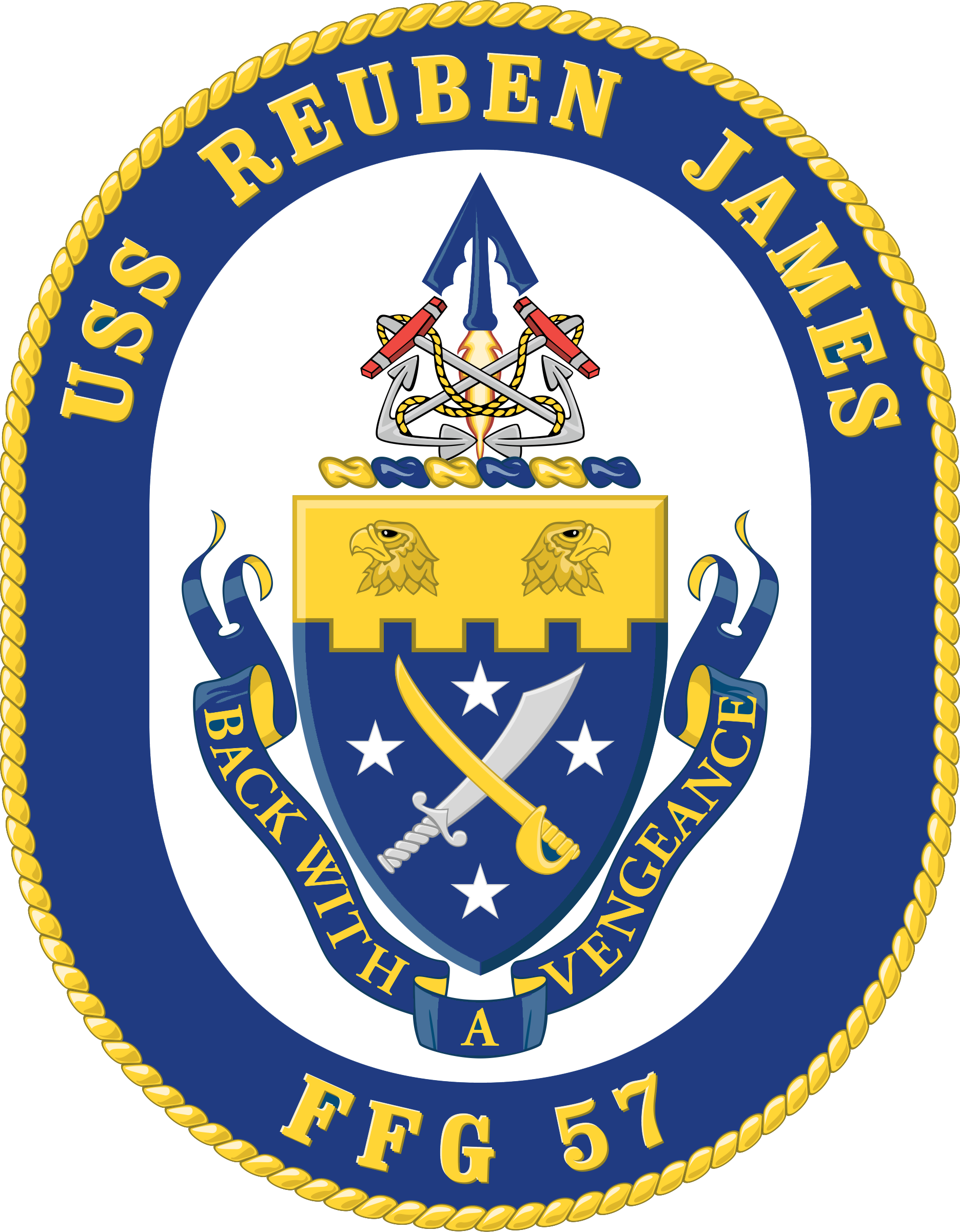
- Badge

General characteristics
- Class & type: Oliver Hazard Perry-class guided missile frigate
- Displacement: 4,100 long tons (4,200 t), full load
- Length: 453 feet (138 m), overall
- Beam: 45 feet (14 m)
- Draft: 22 feet (6.7 m)
- Propulsion: 2 × General Electric LM2500-30 gas turbines generating 41,000 shp (31 MW) through a single shaft and variable pitch propeller; 2 × Auxiliary Propulsion Units, 350 hp (260 kW) retractable electric azimuth thrusters for maneuvering and docking.
- Speed: over 29 knots (54 km/h)
- Range: 5,000 nautical miles at 18 knots (9,300 km at 33 km/h)
- Complement: 15 officers and 190 enlisted, plus SH-60 LAMPS detachment of roughly six officer pilots and 15 enlisted maintainers
- Sensors & processing systems: AN/SPS-49 air-search radar; AN/SPS-55 surface-search radar; CAS and STIR fire-control radar; AN/SQS-56 sonar.
- Electronic warfare & decoys: AN/SLQ-32
- Armament: As built: 1 × OTO Melara Mk 75 76 mm/62 caliber naval gun; 2 × Mk 32 triple-tube (324 mm) launchers for Mark 46 torpedoes; 1 × Vulcan Phalanx CIWS; 4 × .50-cal (12.7 mm) machine guns.; 1 × Mk 13 Mod 4 single-arm launcher for Harpoon anti-ship missiles and SM-1MR Standard anti-ship/air missiles (40 round magazine); Note: As of 2004, Mk 13 systems removed from all active US vessels of this class.; Mk 38 Mod 2 in place of Mk 13
- Aircraft carried: 2 × SH-60B LAMPS Mk III helicopters
- Aviation facilities: 2 × hangars; RAST helicopter hauldown system

USS Reuben James (FFG-57), an Oliver Hazard Perry-class guided missile frigate, was the third ship of the U.S. Navy named for Reuben James, a boatswain's mate who distinguished himself fighting the Barbary pirates. Her crew totaled 201 enlisted, 18 chief petty officers, and 26 officers.

== Ship history ==
=== 1980s ===
The contract to build Reuben James was awarded on 22 March 1982 to Todd Pacific Shipyards, Los Angeles Division, San Pedro, California. Her keel was laid on 19 November 1983, and she was launched on 8 February 1985; sponsored by Lois Haight Herrington, wife of Assistant Secretary of the Navy (Manpower and Reserve Affairs) John S. Herrington. She was delivered to the Navy on 3 March 1986, and commissioned on 22 March. She was faster than 30 knots (35 mph; 56 km/h) and powered by two gas turbine engines. Armed with anti-air and anti-ship missiles, an automated three-inch (76 mm) gun, an anti-missile defense system, and two SH-60 Seahawk anti-submarine helicopters, Reuben James was tasked with hunting submarines as well as with battle group escort and maritime interception. Reuben James joined the Red Stallions of Destroyer Squadron Thirty-One in June 1987.

Assigned to Mideast Force on her maiden deployment, Reuben James participated in twenty-two Operation Earnest Will convoy missions, serving as the convoy commander's flagship on ten of those missions.

=== 1990s ===
On 10 September 1990, Reuben James visited Vladivostok in the Soviet Union.

In August 1991, Reuben James moved from Long Beach, California, to Pearl Harbor, Hawaii. On 1 October 1998, she joined the "Ke Koa O Ke Kai", Destroyer Squadron Thirty-One.

In 1994 Reuben James collided with USNS Pecos while fueling underway (UNREP). The flight deck sustained damage in addition to hangar fire and external hangar wall damage. HSL-37 detachment was on board.

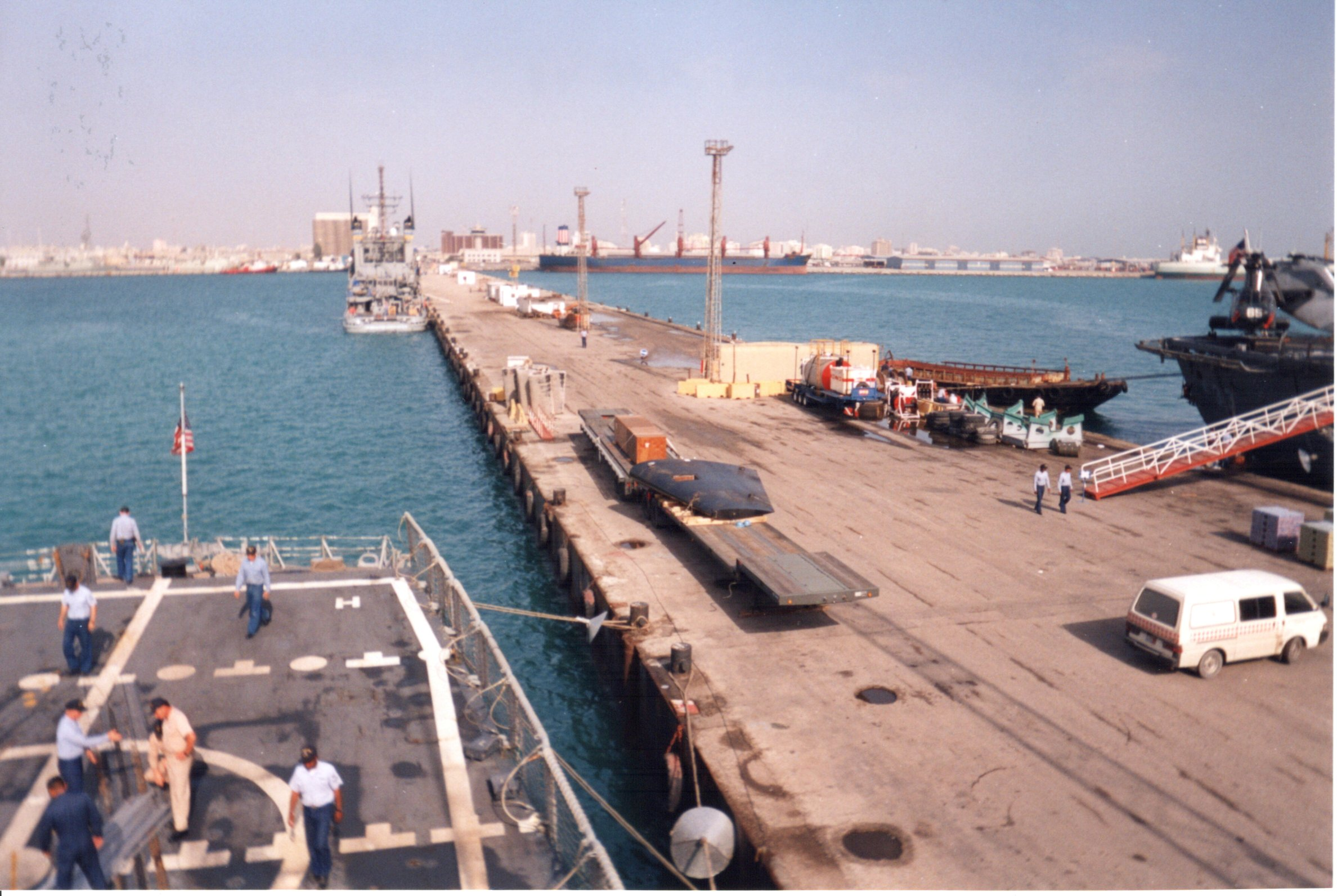
USS Reuben James at the pier in Bahrain. Her replacement rudder is visible on the flatbed trailer. Note USNS Catawba in the background. (8 MAR 1996)

During a WestPac deployment on 21 February 1996, the ship's rudder fell off in the Indian Ocean. The ship used its Auxiliary Power Units (APU) to try to stay on station until rendezvousing with the USNS Catawba (T-ATF-168) on 23 February. USNS Catawba towed Reuben James to Bahrain for repairs. Since a dry dock wasn't available, divers installed a new rudder while the ship was at the pier.

En route to WestPac deployment in 1997, the air detachment's SH-60B Seahawk helicopter was conducting deck landing practice. The Seahawk had landed and was not secured to the deck because it was preparing to lift off again. The ship was hit by a rogue wave which caused the ship to roll steeply to port and the blades of the helicopter struck the flight deck causing the helicopter to roll on its port side and spin 90 degrees with the tail hanging over the port side of the flight deck. The ship docked in Guam where the helicopter was craned off to be repaired. No fault was found with the flight crew or the ship's personnel for the mishap.

=== 2000s ===
Reuben James participated in the CARAT 2000 exercises, including phases in the Philippines, Thailand, Indonesia, Brunei, Malaysia, and Singapore. The first phase of CARAT began in the Philippines on 14 June and the final phase, conducted in Singapore, ended on 22 September. CARAT 2000 demonstrated U.S. commitment to security and stability in Southeast Asia while increasing the operational readiness and capabilities of U.S. forces. The exercise also promoted interoperability and cooperation with U.S. regional friends and allies by offering a broad spectrum of mutually beneficial training opportunities.

In Malaysia, CARAT 2000 encompassed two weeks of extensive training to promote interoperability between U.S. naval forces and the Royal Malaysian Navy and Army. The Strait of Malacca was the setting for several exercises. These included anti-submarine warfare, anti-air warfare, and gunnery exercises. One of the exercises was a semi-final battle problem, or night encounter exercise. The two navies' task groups steamed together in formation for more than 25 hours. The Malaysian-U.S. naval task group was divided into two opposing forces. The Blue Forces consisted of Reuben James, Germantown, Mount Vernon, and the Malaysian ships KD Sri Indera Sakti and KD Lekir. The Blue Forces were supported by U.S. helicopters from Helicopter Anti-Submarine Squadron (Light) HSL-37, Detachment Four, from Hawaii. The Orange Forces consisted of the frigate Sides, the Malaysian ships KD Perkasa, KD Laksamana Tun Abdul Jamil, and a U.S. Navy P-3C Orion aircraft. Columbus, homeported in Pearl Harbor, Hawaii, and Helena, homeported in San Diego, also joined the task group in individual phases.

For nine months from 2 August 2002, to 27 April 2003, Reuben James deployed to the Persian Gulf and participated in Operation Enduring Freedom and Operation Iraqi Freedom as part of Cruiser-Destroyer Group Three, the Abraham Lincoln Battle Group. After serving approximately six months in theater, Reuben James started to make its way back to Pearl Harbor. On New Year's Day 2003, while in port in Brisbane, Australia, the ship was ordered to turn around and go back to the Persian Gulf and the deployment was extended indefinitely. Finally, after an extended deployment of almost nine months, the Abraham Lincoln Battle Group was relieved by USS Nimitz. This deployment was extremely long, breaking a number of records, including the longest deployment ever for a nuclear-powered aircraft carrier.

In July 2003, Reuben James hosted the Japanese Hatakaze-class destroyer Shimakaze for exercises in Pearl Harbor. On 23 October 2003 the crew of Reuben James dressed ship and manned the rails to render honors to President George W. Bush as he toured Pearl Harbor and visited the USS Arizona Memorial.

From February to April 2004, she deployed to the Eastern Pacific with an embarked Coast Guard Law Enforcement Detachment in support of counter-narcotics operations.

Between July and December 2004, Reuben James went through an extensive modernization and maintenance program. In October 2004, Reuben James participated in PASSEX exercises with the Prairial (F731).

As part of Expeditionary Strike Group 3 (ESG 3), Reuben James deployed on 15 February 2006 on a WESTPAC mission to the Persian Gulf in support of Operation Iraqi Freedom and Operation Enduring Freedom. The strike group also consisted of Amphibious Squadron (COMPHIBRON) 3, the 11th Marine Expeditionary Unit (Special Operations Capable), USS Peleliu, the guided-missile cruiser Port Royal, the guided-missile destroyer Gonzalez, the amphibious transport dock Ogden, the dock landing ship Germantown, Tactical Air Control Squadron(TACRON) 11, and the "Black Jacks" of Helicopter Sea Combat Squadron (HSC) 21.

En route to the Persian Gulf, Reuben James stopped in New Caledonia. The strike group relieved USS Tarawa on station in early April 2006 and began its mission of conducting maritime security operations. During operations, Reuben James performed services such as providing medical assistance to Sri Lankan fishermen and rescuing Kenyan sailors. Expeditionary Strike Group 3 was relieved on 9 July 2006 and Reuben James returned to Pearl Harbor in August 2006.

Reuben James participated in a Passing Exercises (PASSEX) with the Philippine Navy frigate Gregorio del Pilar off the coast of Hawaii on 30 July 2011.

The frigate completed her final deployment on 3 May 2013. During the final cruise, the ship visited Japan, Brunei and the Philippines in support of theatre security operations and CARAT 2012. Reuben James was also awarded the USCG Meritorious Unit Citation for fisheries patrols in the economic exclusion zones of Micronesia, Marshall Islands and Nauru.

== Final disposition ==
Reuben James was decommissioned on 18 July 2013, and sunk on 18 January 2016 in a test of a new anti-surface warfare variant of the Raytheon Standard Missile 6 (SM-6) at the U.S. Pacific Missile Range Facility near Hawaii.

== Cultural references ==
Reuben James played a significant role in Tom Clancy's 1986 novel Red Storm Rising. She appeared in the 1990 movie The Hunt for Red October (although her appearance in the film was anachronistic, since she was commissioned about a year after the events in the film). In some scenes, Reuben James was portrayed in the film by other Oliver Hazard Perry frigates — Wadsworth (now ORP Generał Tadeusz Kościuszko) and Gary (the hull number can be seen as Soviet submariners are in their rafts) The ship was later featured prominently in the 2010 novel by Don Brown entitled Malacca Conspiracy.

== See also ==
- List of frigates of the United States Navy
- List of ships sunk by missiles
- Abraham Lincoln Battle Group
