= HSM-37 =

American Navy helicopter squadron

Helicopter Maritime Strike Squadron Three Seven (HSM-37)
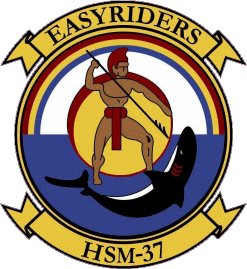
- HSM-37 Insignia
- Active: 3 July 1975 to present
- Country: United States of America
- Branch: United States Navy
- Type: Navy Helicopter Squadron
- Role: Surface warfare (SUW); Anti-submarine warfare (ASW)
- Garrison/HQ: Marine Corps Base Hawaii
- Nickname(s): "Easyriders"

Commanders
- Current commander: CDR Benjamin T. Harris

Helicopter Maritime Strike Squadron Three Seven (HSM-37) "Easyriders" is a United States Navy helicopter squadron based at Marine Corps Base Hawaii. HSM-37 provides helicopter resources for all Arleigh Burke-class destroyers and Ticonderoga-class cruisers based at Pearl Harbor. The squadron was established as Helicopter Anti-Submarine Squadron (Light) Three Seven (HSL-37) on 3 July 1975 and was redesignated HSM-37 on 1 October 2013.

== History ==
HSL-37 was established on 3 July 1975 at Naval Air Station Barbers Point. It became the first U.S. Navy squadron to transition from the SH-2F Seasprite to the SH-60B Seahawk on 6 February 1992. The squadron moved from NAS Barbers Point to Marine Corps Base Hawaii on Kāneʻohe Bay in February 1999. It was redesignated HSM-37 on 1 October 2013 as it began to transition from the SH-60B Seahawk to the MH-60R Seahawk. The first four MH-60Rs were delivered in September 2013. Its last SH-60B was retired on 3 February 2015.

HSM-37 is currently the largest expeditionary helicopter squadron in the U.S. Navy, operating fifteen MH-60R Seahawks for deployment on destroyers or cruisers.

=== Squadron aircraft ===
SH-2F Seasprite, 1975–1992

SH-60 Seahawk

- SH-60B, 1992–2015 (redesignated HSM-37 on 1 October 2013)
- MH-60R, 2013 – present

== See also ==
- History of the United States Navy
- List of United States Navy aircraft squadrons
