= Boatswain's mate (United States Navy) =

United States Navy rating

Boatswain's Mate
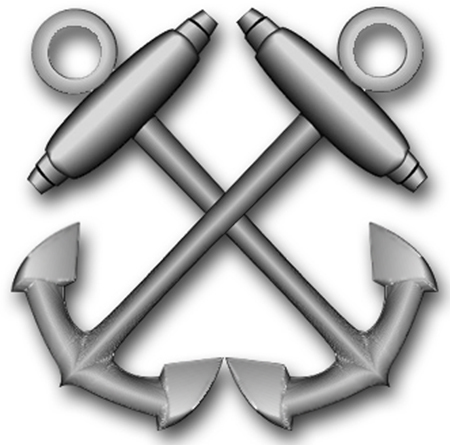
- Rating insignia
- Issued by: United States Navy
- Type: Enlisted rating
- Abbreviation: BM
- Specialty: Deck

The United States Navy occupational rating of boatswain's mate (abbreviated as BM) is a designation given by the Bureau of Naval Personnel (BUPERS) to enlisted members who were rated or "striking" for the rating as a deck seaman. The colloquial form of address for a boatswain's mate is "Boats".

The rating of Boatswain's Mate dates from the American Revolutionary War and is one of the oldest U.S. Navy ratings in continuous existence from 1775 to present. For a period of three months at the end of 2016, the rating (along with all ratings in the Navy) was scheduled for elimination, but the proposed change was unpopular with both sailors and Navy veterans and was reversed in December of that year.

== Duties ==
Navy Enlisted Classification/rank comparison
Abbreviation	Title	Rank
BMCM	Master Chief Boatswain's Mate	Master Chief Petty Officer
BMCS	Senior Chief Boatswain's Mate	Senior Chief Petty Officer
BMC	Chief Boatswain's Mate	Chief Petty Officer
BM1	Boatswain's Mate First Class	Petty Officer First Class
BM2	Boatswain's Mate Second Class	Petty Officer Second Class
BM3	Boatswain's Mate Third Class	Petty Officer Third Class
BMSN	Seaman Boatswains's Mate	Seaman

The Boatswain's is one of the four oldest ratings in the U.S. Navy, along with Quartermasters (responsible for safe navigation, shiphandling, and chart/record maintenance), Gunner's Mates (responsible for maintenance and operation of gunnery equipment and associated systems) and Masters-at-Arms (responsible for maintaining order and enforcing regulations among a ship's crew or the complement of a shore installation).

Boatswain's Mates train, direct, and supervise personnel in ship's maintenance duties in all activities relating to marlinspike seamanship, deck, boat seamanship, painting, upkeep of ship's external structure, rigging, deck equipment, and boats. Boatswain's mates take charge of working parties; perform seamanship tasks; act as petty officer-in-charge of picketboats, self-propelled barges, tugs, and other yard and district craft. They serve in, or take charge of damage control parties. BMs also operate and maintain equipment used in loading and unloading cargo, ammunition, fuel, and general stores. BMs take charge of and supervise UNREP (Underway Replenishment) procedures and equipment. They are integral to ship's navigation and serve as ship's Helmsman and the ship's Lee Helmsman. In addition they also serve as RHIB (rigid-hulled inflatable boat) coxswains.

Boatswain's mates enjoy a normal path of advancement to Chief Warrant Officer and limited duty officer. Candidates must not have a speech impediment. Candidates need not meet any special citizenship or security requirements.

Boatswain's mates also stand watch on ship's bridges, passing information relating to routine and special activities to the crew with the distinctive boatswain's call or boatswain's pipe. On the ancient row-galleys, the boatswain used his pipe to "call the stroke". Later, because its shrill tune could be heard above most of the activity on board, it was used to signal various happenings such as pipe down, and the Side or Away Galley (the boarding or debarking of officials). So essential was this signaling device to the well-being of the ship, that it became a badge of office and honor in the British and U.S. navies.

Boatswain's mates duties cover a large spectrum and range widely depending on the capacity and mission of the vessel or shore installation to which BMs are assigned. They act as landing signalmen enlisted (LSE, guiding helicopters to the designated flight deck of a ship) on air-capable ships. They act as or supervise lookouts of Navy ships, searching the sea for enemy vessels and hazards to navigation. They conduct Search and Rescue (SAR) operations and can respond to other military and civilian ships that request assistance. Ashore, they provide armed security for either their assigned vessel or for their assigned Naval installation.

Boatswains' mates are also a source rating for the Navy's mobile amphibious community. These duties include assault boat coxswain and Craftmaster, navigating specialized assault or working vessels during amphibious operations, salvage work, or inshore work. They are also a recognized source rating for the U.S. Navy's Special Warfare and Special Operations communities. Should a Boatswain's Mate meet eligibility requirements, he can elect to become an SO (formerly SEAL), SB (formerly SWCC), ND (Navy Diver), or EOD (Explosive Ordnance Disposal Technician).

== Ship's boatswain ==
In the U.S. Navy, the ship's Boatswain is a Warrant Officer who serves as a subject matter expert and assists the first lieutenant by supervising the deck force in the execution of major seamanship functions and the maintenance of topside gear. The ship's Boatswain supervises cargo handling and inspects and maintains rigging and deck gear. His duties also include supervising anchoring, mooring, fueling, towing, transferring of personnel and cargo, and the operation and maintenance of ship's boats. The ship's Boatswain is in charge of what the Navy deems "unusual" seamanship operations such as retrieving target drones, and also schedules training for Deck department or Deck division personnel. Another key duty of the ships' Boatswain is supervision of the maintenance of abandon-ship equipment and instruction in abandon-ship techniques.

== Background ==
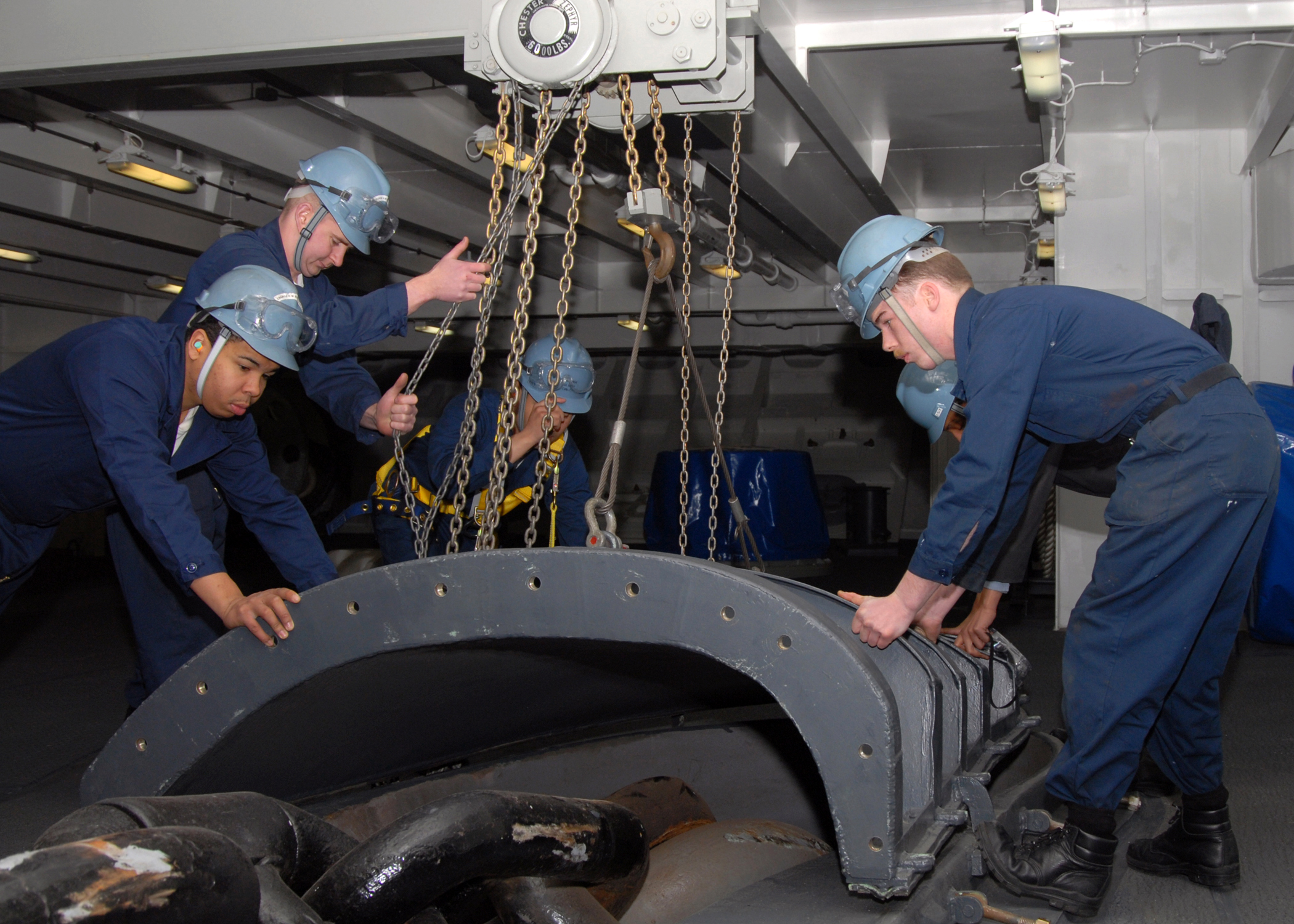
Boatswain's mates prepare for an "anchor drop test" aboard the USS George H.W. Bush to check the operability of the ship's anchor.

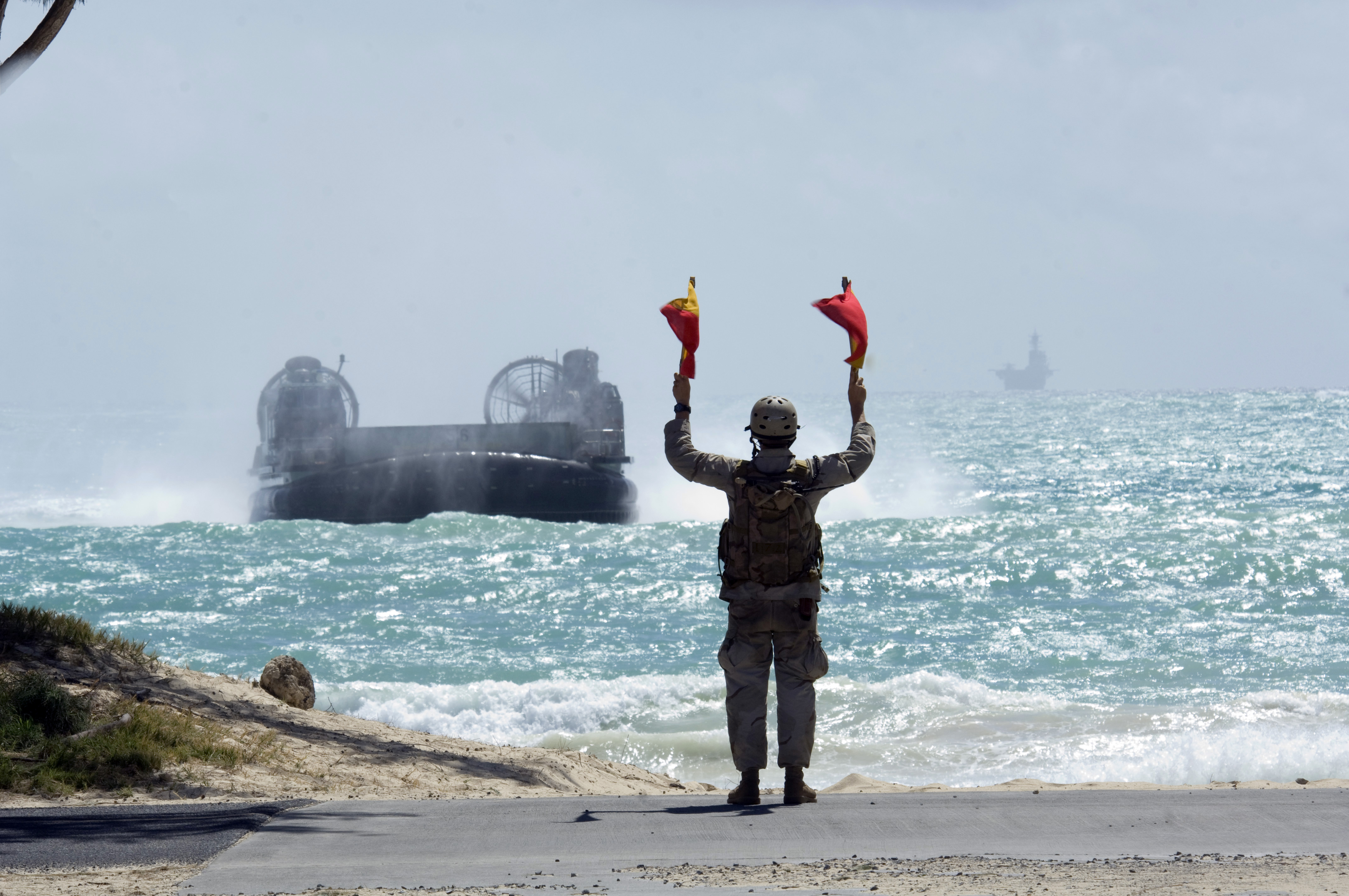
Boatswain's mate guiding an LCAC

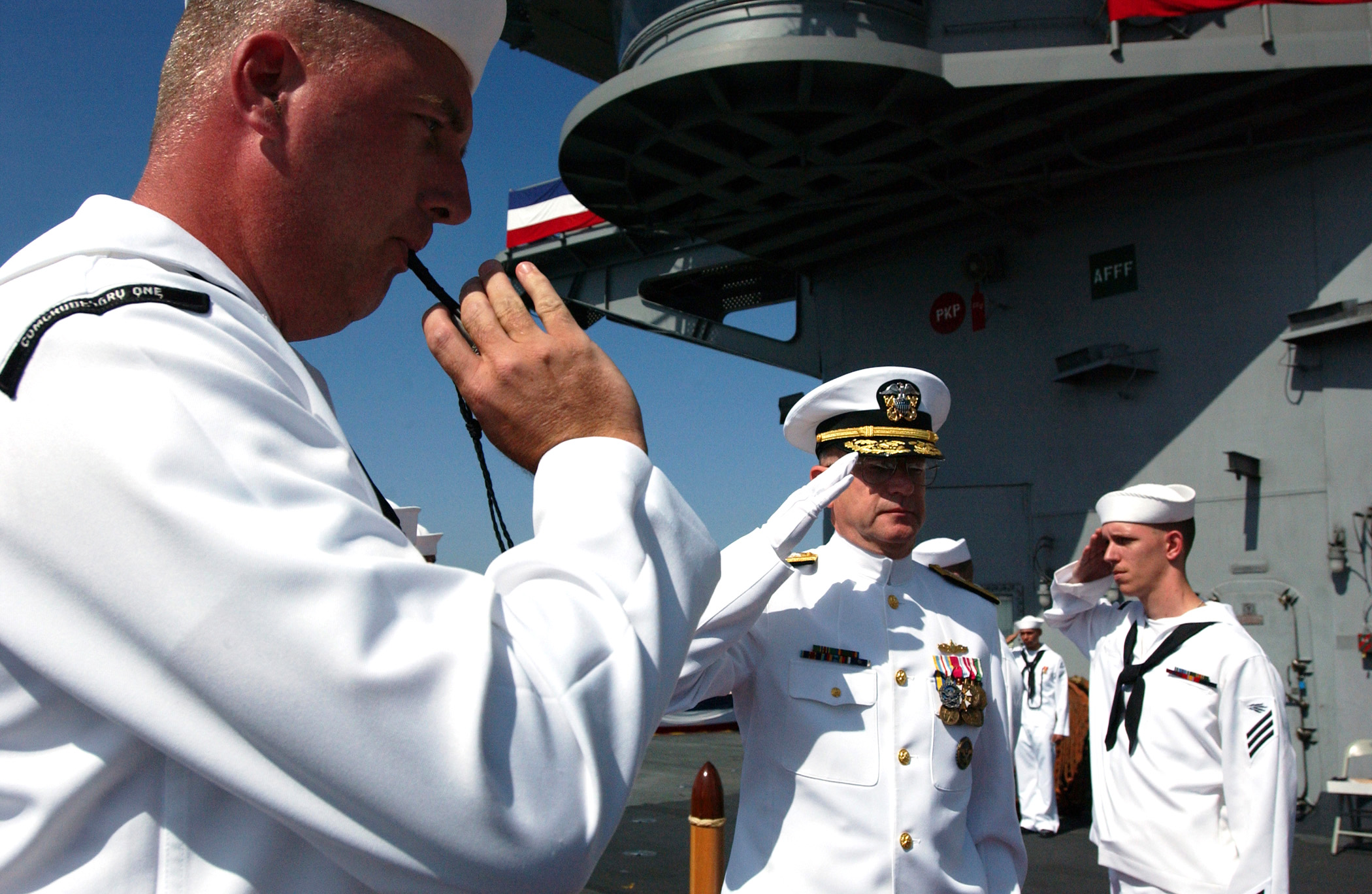
Boatswain's Mate 1st Class pipes arrival honors

The word boatswain has existed in one form or another longer than Modern English has (Modern English only dates back to the beginning of the Renaissance). It is derived from late Old English batswegen, from bat ("boat") + Old Norse sveinn ("swain"), meaning a young man, a follower, retainer, or servant. Various phonetic spellings (such as "bosun" and "Bos'n") have also been in use through the centuries.

Originally, on board sailing ships the boatswain was in charge of a ship's anchors, cordage, colors, deck crew, and the ship's boats. The boatswain would also be in charge of the rigging while the ship was in dock. The boatswain's technical tasks have been modernized with the advent of steam engines and subsequent mechanisation.

=== Origins in the Royal Navy ===
The rank of boatswain was until recently the oldest active rank in Great Britain's Royal Navy, and its origins can be traced back to the year 1040. The Royal Navy's last official boatswain, Commander E W Andrew OBE, retired in 1990.

In 1040, when five English ports began furnishing warships to King Edward the Confessor in exchange for certain privileges, they also furnished crews whose officers were the master, boatswain, carpenter, and cook. Later these officers were "warranted" by the British Admiralty. They maintained and sailed the ships and were the standing officers of the navy. Soldiers commanded by captains would be on board the ships to do the fighting, but they had nothing to do with sailing the ships. The word "soldiering" came about as a seaman's term of contempt for the soldiers and anyone else who avoided shipboard duties.

The warranted officers were often the permanent members of the ships' companies. They stayed with the ships in port between voyages as caretakers, supervising repairs and refitting. Other crewmembers and soldiers might change with each voyage. Early in the fourteenth century, the purser joined the warrant officers. He was originally "the clerk of burser." During the following centuries the gunner, surgeon, chaplain, master-at-arms, schoolmaster, and others signed on.

In the Royal Navy, the task of disciplining the crew fell to the quartermasters and quartermaster's mates. This was done using a rattan boatswain's cane on the boys and a rope's end on adult sailors. Punishment could lawfully be inflicted on an officer's instruction or at his own will, or more formally on deck on the captain's or a court martial's orders. Birching or use of the cat o' nine tails would have been typical in the latter case. In a large crew, he could delegate this to the boatswain's mates, who might alternate after each dozen lashes.

== Notable boatswain's mates ==
A number of boatswain's mates have achieved notable careers in the military. Carl Brashear, the first black American master diver, whose life was the inspiration for the movie Men of Honor, retired as a master chief boatswain's mate. James E. Williams a Medal of Honor recipient, also known as the most decorated enlisted sailor in U.S. Navy history for his actions during the Vietnam War, Reuben James and William Wiley famous for their heroism in the Barbary Wars and namesakes of the ships USS Reuben James and USS Wiley were all U.S. Navy boatswain's mates. Cesar Romero achieved the rating of chief boatswain's mate aboard the Coast Guard crewed assault transport USS Cavalier. Medal of Honor recipients Francis P. Hammerberg, and George Robert Cholister were U.S. Navy boatswain's mates, as was Navy Cross recipient Stephen Bass. USS James E. Williams is an Arleigh Burke-class destroyer, named for BM1 James E. Williams, who was awarded the Medal of Honor while serving in the "brown-water navy" in Vietnam. In 1958 BMCM Sherman Byrd became the first African-American explosive ordnance disposal technician. Don Shipley began his United States Navy career as a Boatswain's Mate in 1978 before going on to become a SEAL in 1984.

== See also ==
- Boatswain
- List of United States Navy ratings
- Boatswain's mate (US Coast Guard)
- Bootsmann

== Sources ==
- The Bluejackets' Manual (21st ed.). Annapolis, MD: United States Naval Institute. 1996 [1902]. ISBN 1-55750-050-9.
