= John Yarnall =

United States Navy officer

- Born: John Joliffe Yarnall; 1786; Wheeling, Virginia (now West Virginia), US
- Died: July 14–August 1815; Unknown. Possibly Strait of Gibraltar
- Occupation: United States Navy officer

John Joliffe Yarnall (1786–1815) was an officer in the United States Navy during the War of 1812 and the Second Barbary War.

== Biography ==
Yarnall was born in Wheeling, Virginia (later West Virginia), Yarnall was appointed midshipman in the Navy on 11 January 1809. Between 1809 and 1812, Yarnall cruised the coastal waters of the United States in Chesapeake and Revenge performing duty that was tantamount to blockading his own country to enforce President James Madison's embargo on trade with the European adversaries during the Napoleonic Wars. In 1813, he was transferred to Oliver Hazard Perry's command on the Great Lakes and became the first lieutenant on board Perry's flagship, Lawrence. He participated in the decisive Battle of Lake Erie on 10 September 1813 and, though wounded, refused to leave his post during the engagement. When Perry shifted his flag to Niagara during the battle, Lt. Yarnall assumed command of Lawrence. After the battle, he took the squadron's wounded on board and carried them back to Erie for medical attention. For his performance in the battle, Yarnall earned Perry's commendation as well as a medal expressing the gratitude of Congress and the country.

In the spring of 1815, Yarnall sailed from New York with Stephen Decatur in the frigate Guerriere for the Mediterranean Sea to conduct the Second Barbary War. On 17 June, off the Algerian coast, his ship encountered and captured Mashuda, the flagship of the Algerian Navy. During that engagement, Yarnall again suffered wounds. In recognition of his role in the battle, and perhaps because of his wounds, Decatur chose Lt. Yarnall to carry the dispatches from Decatur's squadron to the government in Washington, D.C.

== Disappearance and death ==
In July 1815, Yarnall embarked in the sloop-of-war Epervier for the voyage home. The warship was last seen on 14 July 1815 as she passed through the Strait of Gibraltar and into the Atlantic. Presumably, Yarnall and all others on board went down with her during the transatlantic voyage.

Two ships, USS Yarnall, were named for him.

== See also ==
- List of people who disappeared mysteriously at sea
