= USS Torch =

History

United States
- Name: Torch
- Laid down: date unknown
- Acquired: 1814
- In service: 20 May 1815
- Out of service: 1816
- Fate: Sold 3 April 1816

General characteristics
- Type: schooner
- Displacement: 260 tons
- Length: 106 ft (32 m) (between perpendiculars)
- Beam: 26 ft 0 in (7.92 m)
- Draft: 11 ft 9 in (3.58 m)
- Propulsion: schooner sail
- Speed: not known
- Complement: 60
- Armament: 2 × long 18-pounder guns; 10 × 18-pounder carronades

USS Torch was a schooner—heavily armed with guns and carronades—in the United States Navy during the early years of the republic. She was built for service in the War of 1812, but did not see service until the Barbary Wars when she was sent with the American fleet to the Mediterranean to force an end to piracy of American ships.

== Purchased for the War of 1812 ==
Torch—a privateer schooner purchased at Baltimore, Maryland, in 1814 and initially commanded by Lt. Wolcott Chauncey—formed part of the "flying squadron" slated to cruise the West Indies to wage war on British commerce towards the end of the War of 1812. However, the ratification of the Treaty of Ghent on 18 February 1815 terminated hostilities before the squadron, then forming at New York City, could get to sea to undertake wartime operations.

== Assigned to the Barbary Wars ==
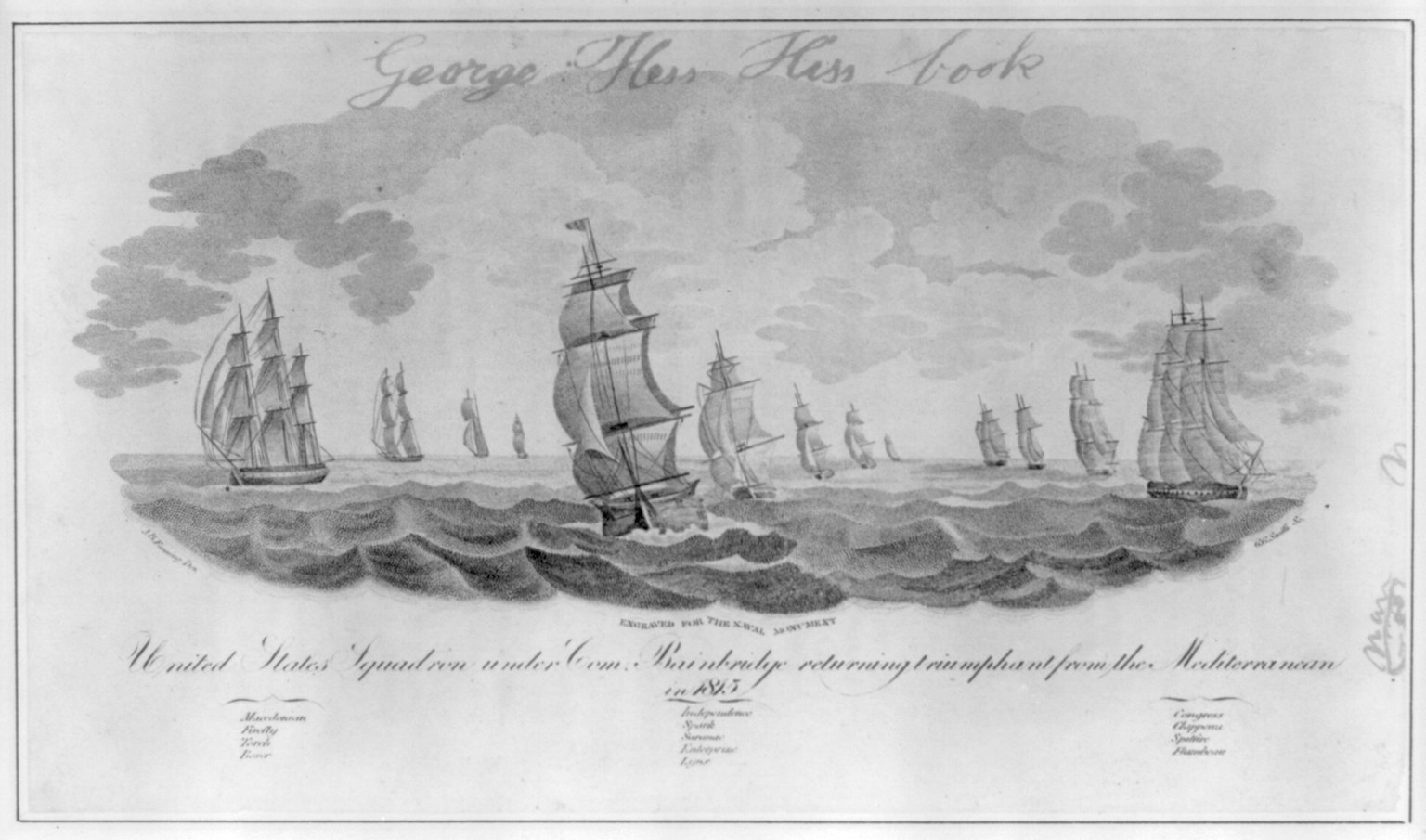
Torch as a part of the United States Mediterranean squadron of 1815 (Second Barbary war)

The kidnapping and piratical activities of the Algerians soon dispelled the hard-won peace which had so recently come to the United States. Only five days after hostilities with Great Britain ceased, the United States declared war on Algeria. Subsequently, a squadron under the command of Capt. Stephen Decatur, in Guerriere, set sail from New York City on 20 May, bound for the Mediterranean.

On 19 June, the Americans made landfall off Cape Gata, Spain, and soon sighted Mashouda, the frigate flying the flag of Algerian Admiral Rais Hammida. Giving chase, the Yankee squadron heavily damaged the enemy ship—decapitating Hammida with a 32-pounder shot in the process—and forced her to surrender.

The remainder of the squadron set out in search of other Algerian vessels while Mashouda was sent to Cartagena, Spain under guard of Macedonian. Off Cape Palos, Spain, this remainder spotted 22-gun brig Estido and bent on sail to make contact. The wily enemy, however, ran into shoal waters where the heavier American frigates feared to go for danger of running aground.

Torch, whose shallower draft permitted her to give chase, joined Epervier, Spitfire, and Spark in forcing Estido aground. The Americans took possession of the enemy brig and 83 prisoners.

The successful conclusion of the campaign to force the Algerians to abandon their piratical ways followed thereafter.

Torch subsequently returned home to the United States and was sold on 3 April 1816.
