= Battle off Cape Gata =

1815 naval battle between Algiers and the United States in the Mediterranean Sea

Coordinates: 36°47′00″N 02°06′00″E

- Part of Second Barbary War
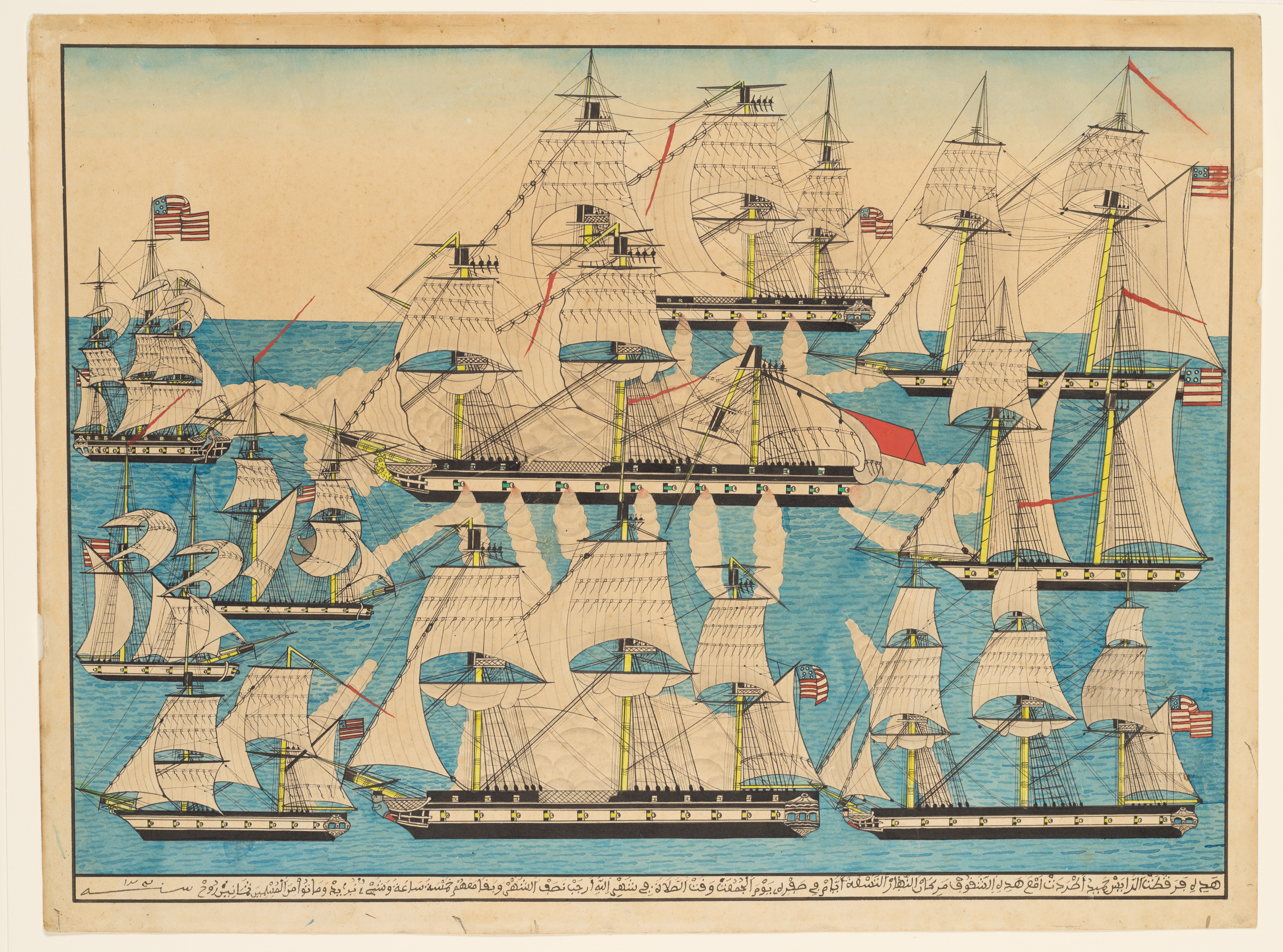
- The Algerian Meshuda surrounded by an American fleet off Cape Gata
Date	June 17, 1815
Location	off Cape Gata (Spain), Mediterranean Sea
Result	American victory

Belligerents
United States	Regency of Algiers

Commanders and leaders
Stephen Decatur Jr.	Raïs Hamidou †

Strength
3 frigates 2 sloops 2 brigantines 2 schooners	1 frigate

Casualties and losses
10 killed 30 wounded	30 killed Many wounded 406 captured 1 frigate captured

The Battle off Cape Gata, which took place June 17, 1815, off the south-east coast of Spain, was the first battle of the Second Barbary War. A squadron of U.S. vessels, under the command of Stephen Decatur Jr., met and engaged the flagship of the Algerine Navy, the frigate Meshuda under Admiral Hamidou. After a sharp action, Decatur's squadron captured the Algerine frigate and won a decisive victory over the Algerines.

== Background ==
Stephen Decatur's squadron had left New York on May 20, 1815, with orders to destroy Algerine vessels and bring the Dey of Algiers to terms for attacking American shipping. He reached the Strait of Gibraltar on June 15, 1815, and began his mission. After learning that several Algerine cruisers had crossed the Strait of Gibraltar shortly before he did, Commodore Stephen Decatur, Jr. decided to give them chase and cut them off before they could reach Algiers.

== Battle ==
Commanding a fleet of nine vessels, he encountered the Algerine flagship Mashouda (also spelled 'Mashuda' or 'Meshuda') of forty-six guns off Cape Gata, Spain. Heavily outnumbered, Admiral Rais Hamidou tried to flee to the port of Algiers, but was overtaken by the American squadron. After receiving damage from the Constellation and with the admiral himself being wounded, the Algerines instead decided to change course and try for the safety of a neutral port along the Spanish coast.

The Constellation and the sloop Ontario were able to close in and hammer the Algerine frigate. The Algerines resorted to replying with musket fire at close range, but Decatur was able to get his flagship, the Guerriere, alongside the Algerine frigate. Firing a devastating broadside, the Guerriere crippled the enemy and killed the Algerine admiral. Decatur ceased firing, expecting the Algerine ship to surrender. Instead the Algerines continued to fight hopelessly with muskets as long as they were able. As a result, Decatur had the sloop Epervier fire nine broadsides into the Meshuda with disastrous effect. The bloodied Algerines then struck their colors and ended the battle.

== Aftermath ==
Four hundred and six Algerines were captured, most wounded, and thirty killed. American losses were remarkably light, with only four dead and ten wounded (all on the Guerriere). Most of the American casualties were due to a gun explosion, but a few were due to enemy action. After sending the captured frigate to Cartagena, Decatur continued towards Algiers. However, his squadron encountered another Algerine cruiser off Cape Palos. After engaging and capturing the cruiser Decatur arrived in Algiers. The loss of the Meshuda and Admiral Hamidou greatly weakened Algerine morale and naval capabilities. The American squadron met no further opposition and by a mere show of force were able to bring the Dey to terms, thus ending the war.

== Bibliography ==
- London, Joshua (2005). Victory in Tripoli. Macmillan. pp. 288. ISBN 0471444154. Url
- Panzac, Daniel (2005). The Barbary Corsairs: The End of a Legend, 1800-1820.
  K. Brill, Netherlands. p. 352. ISBN 9789004125940. Url
- "Victory in Tripoli", by Joshua E. London pgs, 237-239
- Dictionary of American Fighting Ships:Epervier
