= USS Guerriere (1814) =

American Navy frigate

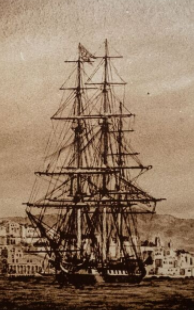
- Painting of Guerriere at the National Museum of the United States Navy

History

United States
- Name: Guerriere
- Namesake: HMS Guerriere
- Ordered: 1812
- Builder: Philadelphia Navy Yard
- Laid down: 1812
- Launched: 20 June 1814
- Decommissioned: 19 December 1831
- In service: 1815-1831
- Fate: Broken up, 1841

General characteristics
- Type: First class frigate
- Tonnage: 1508
- Length: 175 ft (53 m)
- Beam: 45 ft 6 in (13.87 m)
- Draft: 14 ft 6 in (4.42 m)
- Propulsion: Sail
- Sail plan: Full-rigged ship
- Complement: 400 officers and enlisted
- Armament: 33 × 24-pounder guns; 20 × 42-pounder carronades

USS Guerriere was a 53-gun frigate of the United States. She was named after HMS Guerriere, a 38-gun Royal Navy frigate captured by USS Constitution on 19 August 1812. This victory was one of the United States' first in the War of 1812.

She was built at the Philadelphia Navy Yard under the supervision of Joseph and Francis Grice. She was launched on 20 June 1814 under the command of Commodore John Rodgers and attached to the Delaware Flotilla. She served in the United States Navy during the Second Barbary War. While in service, Guerriere was employed as a schoolship, hosting a nautical school that educated and developed young naval officers by the direction of Commodore Arthur Sinclair. This modest program later evolved into the United States Naval Academy at Annapolis.

== Design and development ==
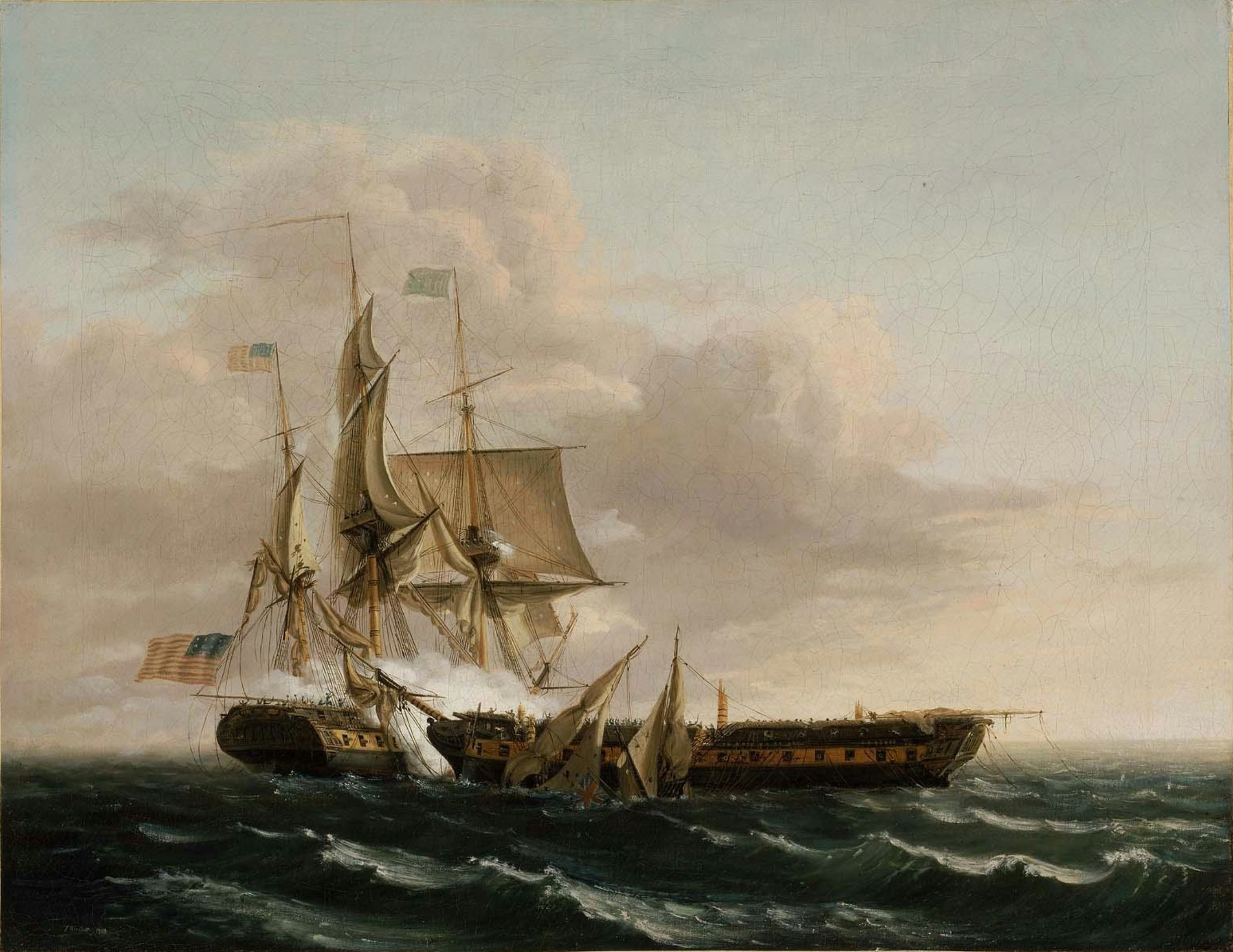
USS Constitution defeating HMS Guerriere in the War of 1812; the engagement served as namesake for USS Guerriere.

Under the Jefferson Administration in the early 1800s, the US Navy was envisioned as a militia-based force that operated small gunboats to protect the American coast, instead of ocean-going warships that could meet an enemy at sea. Congress opposed expanding the Navy, but reversed course at the start of the War of 1812. On 5 January 1813, the legislature ordered six Java-class frigates, which constituted the first purpose-built frigates for the US Navy since 1800. The ships were designed by William Doughty and based on the 44-gun variant of the original six frigates developed by Joshua Humphreys. Humphreys believed the Navy would be outnumbered against an enemy navy. To compensate, he designed heavy frigates armed with powerful 24 lb (11 kg) cannons that could defeat a traditional frigate in a one-on-one engagement while outmaneuvering larger ships of the line. Doughty slightly modified the design to feature a fuller hull, greater buoyancy, strengthened spar deck, and improved sailing ability. The class featured a length between perpendiculars of 175 feet (53 m), beam of 44 feet 6 inches (13.56 m), draft of 13 feet 8 inches (4.17 m) and armed with thirty-three 24 lb (11 kg) long guns on the main deck and twenty 42 lb (19 kg) carronades on the forecastle and quarterdeck. The ships had a compliment of 400, displacement of 1,508 short tons (1,368 t), were plainly finished, and lacked figureheads.

Initially named Continental, the frigate was laid down at the Philadelphia Navy Yard in 1813. She was renamed Guerriere, after the victory of USS Constitution over HMS Guerriere earlier in the war, and launched on 20 June 1814. Construction of the frigate was rushed, and the war-time work incorporated substandard material that rapidly decayed and limited service lives of Guerriere and her sister ship Java; the pair were the only members of the class to be launched.

== Service history ==
=== Second Barbary War ===
After fitting out, she was transferred to the command of Captain Stephen Decatur and became the flagship of the squadron assembled at New York. She sailed from New York on 20 May 1815 to lead the squadron in terminating piratical acts against American merchant commerce by Algiers and other Barbary States.

==== Battle off Cape Gata ====
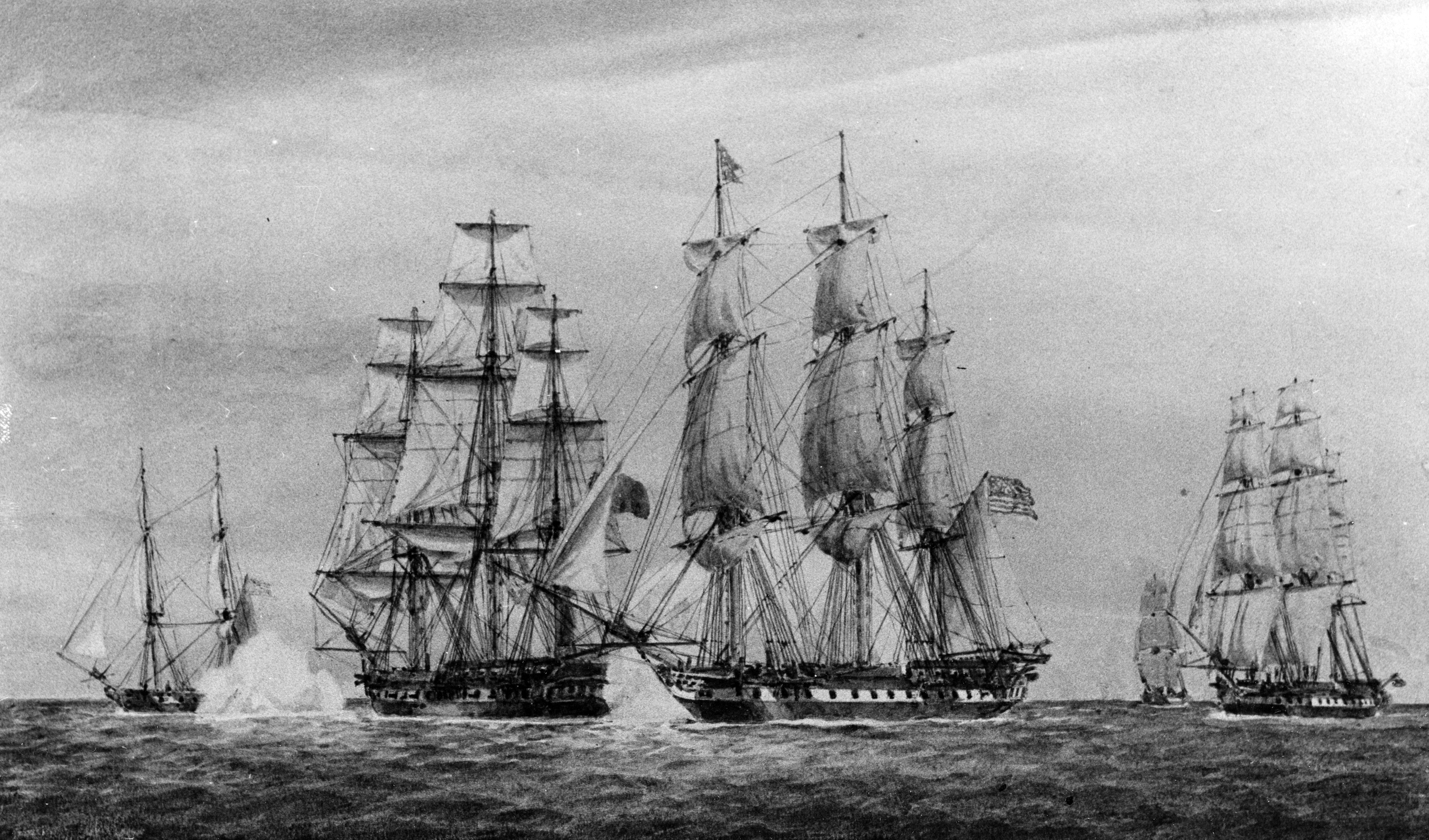
Guerriere (center right) fires a broadside into the aft of Meshuda (center left) during the Battle off Cape Gata.

In June 1815, a squadron of Algerian corsairs lead by Raïs Hamidou onboard the 44-gun frigate Meshuda returned from a raid against merchant ships in the Atlantic. Dectar's squadron passed the Straight of Gibraltar on 15 June, learned about the corsairs' presence, and hoped to intercept them. On 17 June off Cape Gata, the Americans spotted Meshuda alone after the flagship lost contact with the ships she had been sailing with. Hamidou attempted to flee to Algiers, but was outnumbered and outgunned. An opening volley from USS Constellation struck Meshuda, wounding Hamidou with splinters. He refused to be treated below deck, and ordered a chair to be brought onto the deck so he could continue overseeing the battle. After returning fire, he ordered his ship to turn in an attempt to reach a neutral Spanish port. The act allowed USS Ontario to cross her bow and USS Guerriere to approach. Algerian sharpshooters fired unopposed at Guerriere, striking several Americans, before Decatur came along and fired two broadsides. One of the 42 lb (19 kg) cannon balls split Hamidou in two and forced most of the crew below deck. Guerriere then sailed ahead and USS Epervier came along Meshuda's starboard and fired nine salvos until the Algerians surrendered. Ten sailors on Gurerriere were injured and four killed, while 30 Algerian sailors were killed in the battle and 406 taken prisoner.

==== Battle of Cape Palos ====
After the capture of Meshuda, Dectar swept waters off Catalonia to find ships that had sailed with the Algerian fleet. His frigates, such as Guerriere, were farther out to sea as the smaller American ships went into shallow waters near the coast line. On 19 June, Ontario found the 22-gun Algerian brig Estedio aground. The Americans hesitated to attack, concerned about potentially running aground and violating Spanish neutrality. Aboard Guerriere, Dectar ordered an attack. USS Epervier, Spark, Torch, and Spitfire then prompty captured the brig, killing 23 Algerians and captured eighty.

==== Gunboat diplomacy ====
Guerriere arrived at Algiers on 28 June 1815, ready to act with her squadron for the capture of every Algerian ship that entered port unless the Dey ratified the terms of a peace treaty sent him by Decatur. The treaty was negotiated on board Guerriere on 30 June 1815, ending the payment of tribute to Algiers and exacting full payment for injuries to American commerce.

Guerriere next led the squadron in a show of force that resulted in a peace settlement with Tunis on 13 July 1815 and with Tripoli on 9 August 1815.

Having enforced the peace in less than six weeks from time of sailing from the United States, she combined with the entire Mediterranean Squadron naval force assembled at Gibraltar under Commodore William Bainbridge. The 18 warships, including ship-of-the-line Independence, five frigates, two sloops-of-war, seven brigs, and three schooners, was the largest fleet ever collected under the American flag in the Mediterranean Sea to that time. It marked the beginning of a permanent naval fleet in the Mediterranean, which has evolved into the powerful 6th Fleet of today. Then, as today, the fleet was a factor in keeping the peace and strengthening the international diplomacy of the nation.

=== Peacetime operations ===
Guerriere arrived to New York on 12 November 1815, and was laid up for repairs at the Boston Navy Yard on 4 March 1816. She was recommissioned under the command of Thomas Macdonough in 22 April 1818, and on 24 July, transported the American Minister to Russia to Kronstadt. The frigate arrived on 17 September after visiting Gibraltar, Cowes, and Copenhagen. She then sailed to the Mediterranean, where she remained until 26 July 1819. After sailing from Livorno, the ship arrived at Norfolk on 4 October 1819. Placed in ordinary on 8 November 1820, she was reused as a schoolship in the Norfolk Navy Yard for classes of midshipmen for the next eight years.

Throughout the 1820s, the continuation of the Spanish American wars of independence posed a threat to American merchant ships in the region. The Navy was tasked with maintaining American neutrality and protecting shipping, and enlarged the Pacific Squadron as a result. In November 1828, Guerriere was refitted to serve as flagship of the enlarged squadron, and set sail on 13 February 1829. After offloading passengers at Rio de Janeiro, she rounded Cape Horn and arrived at Callao, Peru. For the next two years, she protected American ships, such as the whaling fleet, between South America and Hawaii. She left Callao on 8 September 1831, arrived back at Norfolk on 29 November 1831, and was decommissioned on 19 December 1831. She was in ordinary for the next decade, and was surveyed in 1840; it was determined repairs would cost more than a new ship, and she was broken up in May 1841.

== Bibliography ==
- Waldo, Samuel Putnam (1821).
  The life and character of Stephen Decatur. P. B. Goodsell, Hartford, Conn., 1821.
