= Admiral Nicholson =

Admiral Nicholson may refer to:

- Douglas Nicholson (1867–1946), British Royal Navy admiral
- Gresham Nicholson (1892–1975), British Royal Navy admiral
- Henry Nicholson (Royal Navy officer) (1835–1914), British Royal Navy admiral
- James W. Nicholson (1821–1887), U.S. Navy rear admiral
- Reginald F. Nicholson (1852–1939), U.S. Navy rear admiral
- William Nicholson (Royal Navy officer) (1863–1932), British Royal Navy admiral
- Wilmot Nicholson (1872–1947), British Royal Navy admiral

== See also ==
- John B. Nicolson (1783–1846), U.S. Navy commodore, equivalent rank during this era
