= USS Yarnall (DD-541) =

Fletcher-class destroyer

Coordinates: 23.2039734°N 120.2106887°E

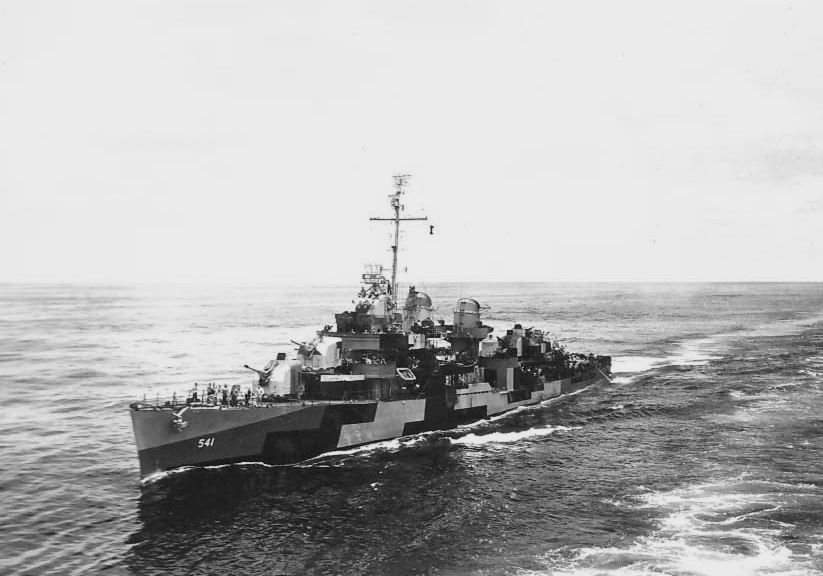
- USS Yarnall underway in 1944

History

United States
- Name: Yarnall
- Namesake: John Yarnall
- Builder: Bethlehem Shipbuilding Corporation
- Laid down: 5 December 1942
- Launched: 25 July 1943
- Sponsored by: Mrs. Earl Groves
- Commissioned: 30 December 1943
- Decommissioned: 15 January 1947
- Recommissioned: 28 February 1951
- Decommissioned: 30 September 1958
- Stricken: 25 January 1974
- Identification: Callsign: NBDA; Hull number: DD-541
- Fate: Transferred to Taiwan, 10 June 1968

History

Taiwan
- Name: Kun Yang; (昆陽)
- Namesake: Kun Yang
- Acquired: 10 June 1968
- Reclassified: DD-934, January 1976; DD-919, 1 October 1979; DDG-919, 2 November 1982
- Identification: Hull number: DD-19
- Decommissioned: 16 October 1999
- Stricken: 11 November 1999
- Fate: Sunk as target

General characteristics
- Class & type: Fletcher-class destroyer
- Displacement: 2,050 tons
- Length: 376 ft 6 in (114.7 m)
- Beam: 39 ft 8 in (12.1 m)
- Draft: 17 ft 9 in (5.4 m)
- Propulsion: 60,000 shp (45 MW); 2 propellers
- Speed: 35 knots (65 km/h; 40 mph)
- Range: 6500 nmi. (12,000 km) @ 15 knots (28 km/h)
- Complement: 329
- Armament: 5 × single Mk 12 5 in (127 mm)/38 guns; 5 × twin 40 mm (1.6 in) Bofors AA guns; 7 × single 20 mm (0.8 in) Oerlikon AA guns; 2 × quintuple 21 in (533 mm) torpedo tubes; 6 × single depth charge throwers; 2 × depth charge racks

USS Yarnall (DD-541), a Fletcher-class destroyer, was the second ship of the United States Navy to be named for Lieutenant John Yarnall (1786–1815).

== Construction and career ==
Yarnall was laid down on 5 December 1942 at San Francisco, Calif., by the Bethlehem Steel Co.; launched on 25 July 1943; sponsored by Mrs. Earl Groves; and commissioned on 30 December 1943.

=== Service in the United States Navy ===
The destroyer spent the first two months of 1944 conducting her shakedown cruise and other training exercises in the San Diego operating area. She departed the west coast early in March and arrived at Oahu on the 19th. For the next 10 weeks, Yarnall carried out additional tactical exercises in the Hawaiian Islands.

==== Marianas campaign ====
On 31 May, the warship stood out of Pearl Harbor with Task Group 52.17 (TG 52.17) and set a course—via Kwajalein in the Marshall Islands—for the invasion of Saipan in the Marianas. For that operation, Yarnall was assigned to Fire Support Group 1 under Rear Admiral Jesse B. Oldendorf. When her task group began its pre-landing bombardment of Saipan on 14 June, Yarnall screened Cleveland (CL-55) and Montpelier (CL-57) against attack, and also fired 148 five inch shells. On 15 June, the day of the assault, she continued to screen Cleveland and, on the following day, carried out her first call fire mission—a dual-purpose action to help repulse an enemy counterattack and to destroy a bothersome pillbox.

On the 17th, as a result of the submarine sightings of the Japanese fleet moving toward the Marianas, Yarnall and 20 other destroyers were detached from direct support for the invasion and ordered to screen the fast carriers. Yarnall joined TG 58.7, Rear Admiral Willis A. Lee's hastily composed battle line, in preparation for what would be the Battle of the Philippine Sea. Her first antiaircraft combat was at 05:15 on 19 June when a Mitsubishi A6M "Zeke" tried to bomb Stockham (DD-683) and then began a strafing run on Yarnall. She engaged the attacker with three guns of her main battery; as the plane closed on the destroyer's port quarter it exploded and splashed into the sea, Yarnall's first victory.

About five hours after that attack, the ship received word of the first of the four large air raids launched by the Japanese Mobile Fleet to attempt to break up the American invasion force off Saipan. At about 10:45, Yarnall and Stockham encountered the first carrier-based aircraft of the battle when five Aichi D3A "Val" dive bombers peeled off to attack the two picket destroyers. Yarnall's fire shot one down, and the remaining four flew off to attack the larger ships of the American fleet. Word of the approach of the second raid arrived at 11:10; and, 35 minutes later, about 20 enemy planes broke through the F6F Hellcats vectored out to intercept them. Yarnall fired at seven of those planes, shooting down one, the last combat of the day. Though the Japanese mounted two more raids, they approached Task Force 58 (TF 58) from directions which did not bring them close to Yarnall.

On the 20th, no enemy planes attacked TF 58. Instead, the Japanese began their withdrawal toward Japan. American carrier search planes found the enemy late in the day, and TF 58 launched air strikes from extreme range. After darkness fell that evening, Yarnall's searchlights helped to guide the returning airmen to their carriers. The following day, the destroyer returned to the coast of Saipan to resume call fire missions supporting the troops fighting ashore. She continued her labors in the Marianas until 8 July, when the warship left in the screen of a convoy bound for the Marshalls. After arriving at Eniwetok on the 12th, she took on ammunition, provisions, and fuel and headed back to the Marianas on the 15th. There, she resumed patrol and antisubmarine screening duties and kept at such tasks until the 25th when she moved inshore to provide gunfire support for the troops occupying Tinian.

The warship alternated screening and bombardment missions in the Marianas until 16 August when she again sailed for the Marshalls. Yarnall remained at Eniwetok from 20 to 29 August. On 29 August she left the anchorage in company with TG 38.2 for an aerial sweep of the Philippine Islands in preparation for the invasion of the archipelago at Leyte. Following those raids, the carriers and their escorts rested at Ulithi Atoll from 1 to 6 October.

==== Philippines campaign ====
On the latter day, Yarnall sortied with the entire Fast Carrier Task Force for a three-day aerial sweep of Japanese air bases on Formosa. During that operation, Yarnall provided aircrew rescue services and performed antiaircraft and antisubmarine screening duties. During the first day of that attack, the destroyer fired on 15 enemy planes and splashed two of them. The following evening, she barely evaded a bomb which exploded close astern. She emerged unscathed from another bombing attack on the 14th.

Following the Formosa raid, Yarnall's unit steamed south to operate off Luzon. She screened the carriers while their planes suppressed Japanese land-based air-power in the vicinity during the landings at Leyte. During the three-phased Battle of Leyte Gulf which thwarted the Japanese attempt to break up the American liberation of Leyte, Yarnall continued to screen the carriers as they raced northward to destroy Admiral Ozawa's decoy force built around planeless aircraft carriers. After successfully completing that mission, TF 38 made a fueling rendezvous on 30 and 31 October and then resumed its duty pounding enemy installations on Luzon.

At the end of the first week in November, the carriers and their escorts once again retired to Ulithi. The destroyer returned to sea on 14 November to screen TF 38 during further aerial attacks on Japanese installations in the Philippines. On 23 November, she headed back to Ulithi with TG 38.1 for logistics. In December, she returned to the Philippines with TG 38.1 to support the landings on the island of Mindoro and to continue the pressure on Japanese air forces based on Luzon. During that mission, she successfully weathered the famous typhoon on 17 December 1944 which claimed destroyers Hull (DD-350), Monaghan (DD-354), and Spence (DD-512). She returned to Ulithi on 24 December and remained there until January 1945.

On 1 January, TG 38.1 stood out of Ulithi to provide air support for landings on Luzon at Lingayen Gulf. The planes hit Formosa on the 3d and 4th, pounded airfields on Luzon on the 6th and 7th, and returned to Formosa installations on the day of the landings, 9 January. That night, Yarnall accompanied the fast carriers through Bashi Channel into the South China Sea to begin a series of raids on Japan's inner defense line. Unopposed by the Japanese Fleet, TF 38 sent planes against bases at Camranh Bay and Saigon in Indochina, then against Formosa on 15 January. Fighters attacked Amoy, Swatow, and Hong Kong in China as well as Hainan Island in the Gulf of Tonkin. On the 16th, they returned to Hong Kong and Hainan for a repeat performance and for good measure made a sweep of Canton. The task force exited the South China Sea via Balintang Channel and then hit Formosa and the Nansei Shoto on 21 January. Okinawa felt the carriers' punch on the 22d; and, two days later, TF 38 set a course back to Ulithi.

==== Iwo Jima and Okinawa ====
On 10 February, Yarnall left Ulithi with TF 38 to attack the Japanese home islands for the first time since the Halsey-Doolittle Raid and to provide strategic cover for the assault on Iwo Jima. For two days, 16 and 17 February, the skies over Tokyo rained death and destruction. On the 18th, Yarnall steamed south with the carriers to lend the marines a hand during the Iwo Jima landings. While TF 38 planes supported the assault, Yarnall protected their floating bases from enemy air and submarine attacks. She remained in the vicinity of the Volcano Islands until the 22d when she and the carriers again headed toward the Japanese home islands for another swipe at Tokyo on the 25th. Then, after rendezvousing with TG 50.8, the logistics group, TF 38 sent its planes to strike Okinawa on 1 March.

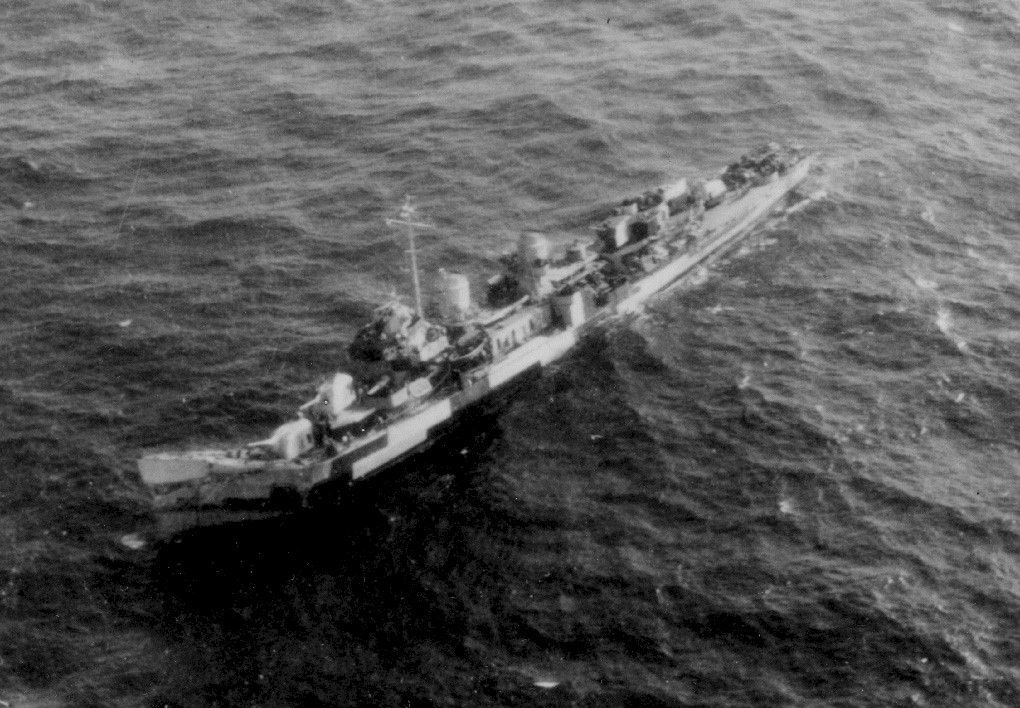
Yarnall damaged after a collision on 4 March 1945

On 3 March, Yarnall received orders transferring her from TG 58.2 to TG 59.6 for a practice attack on the main body of TF 59. While closing the objective on the night of 4 and 5 March, she collided with Ringgold (DD-500). Ringgold suffered a sheared-off bow while Yarnall also suffered one man killed and six others injured. Towed to Ulithi by Molala (ATF-106), she reached the anchorage on 7 March. On the 8th, her bow broke off and sank. While at Ulithi, she had a false bow fitted for the voyage back to the United States for permanent repairs. She stood out of Ulithi on 5 April and steamed via Pearl Harbor to the Mare Island Navy Yard where she underwent repairs until 2 July.

The warship returned to Pearl Harbor in July and conducted training operations in the Hawaiian Islands through the end of the war. Two days after the cessation of hostilities, Yarnall set a course for Tokyo, Japan, to participate in the postwar occupation. She was present in Tokyo Bay on 2 September when Japanese officials signed the surrender document on board Missouri (BB-63) and remained in the Far East supporting minesweeping operations until the end of October. On the 31st, she put to sea and shaped a course for San Diego, Calif., where, though she remained in commission, she was placed in an inactive status. Berthed at San Diego with the Pacific Reserve Fleet, Yarnall was finally placed out of commission on 15 January 1947.

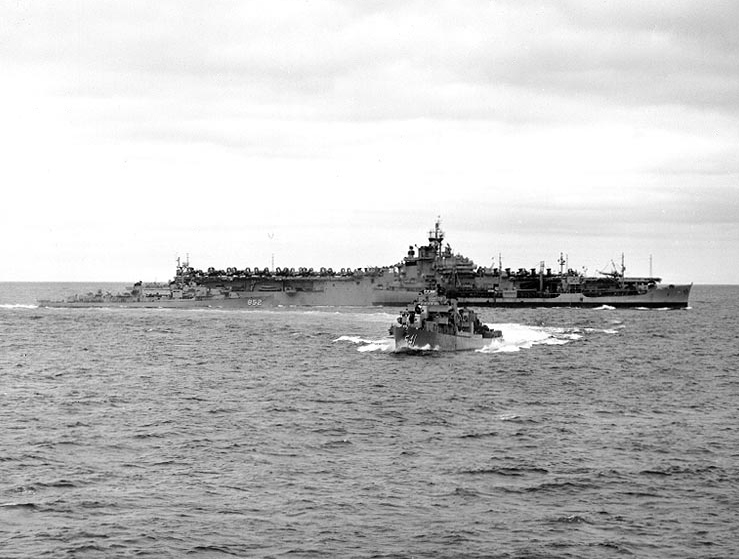
Bon Homme Richard and Yarnall refueling off Korea 1951

==== Korean War ====
The outbreak of the Korean War in June 1950 brought many ships out of the "mothball fleet." Yarnall was ordered back into active service on 31 August 1950, and she was recommissioned at San Diego on 28 February 1951. She reported for duty with the Pacific Fleet on 20 March and conducted shakedown training and other exercises along the west coast until mid-May. On 15 May, Yarnall departed San Diego for Japan. Steaming via Pearl Harbor, she arrived in Yokosuka on 7 June and, three days later, got underway for her first tour of combat duty in Korean waters. For the most part, Yarnall served in the screen of TF 77, the carrier task force, though on occasion she moved close to the coast of Korea to provide gunfire support for the United Nations troops operating ashore. Her first Korean War deployment was punctuated by periodic port calls, mostly at Yokosuka, but also at Okinawa and at Keelung, Taiwan. In August, she served briefly with the Taiwan Strait patrol before returning to the Korean combat zone in September.

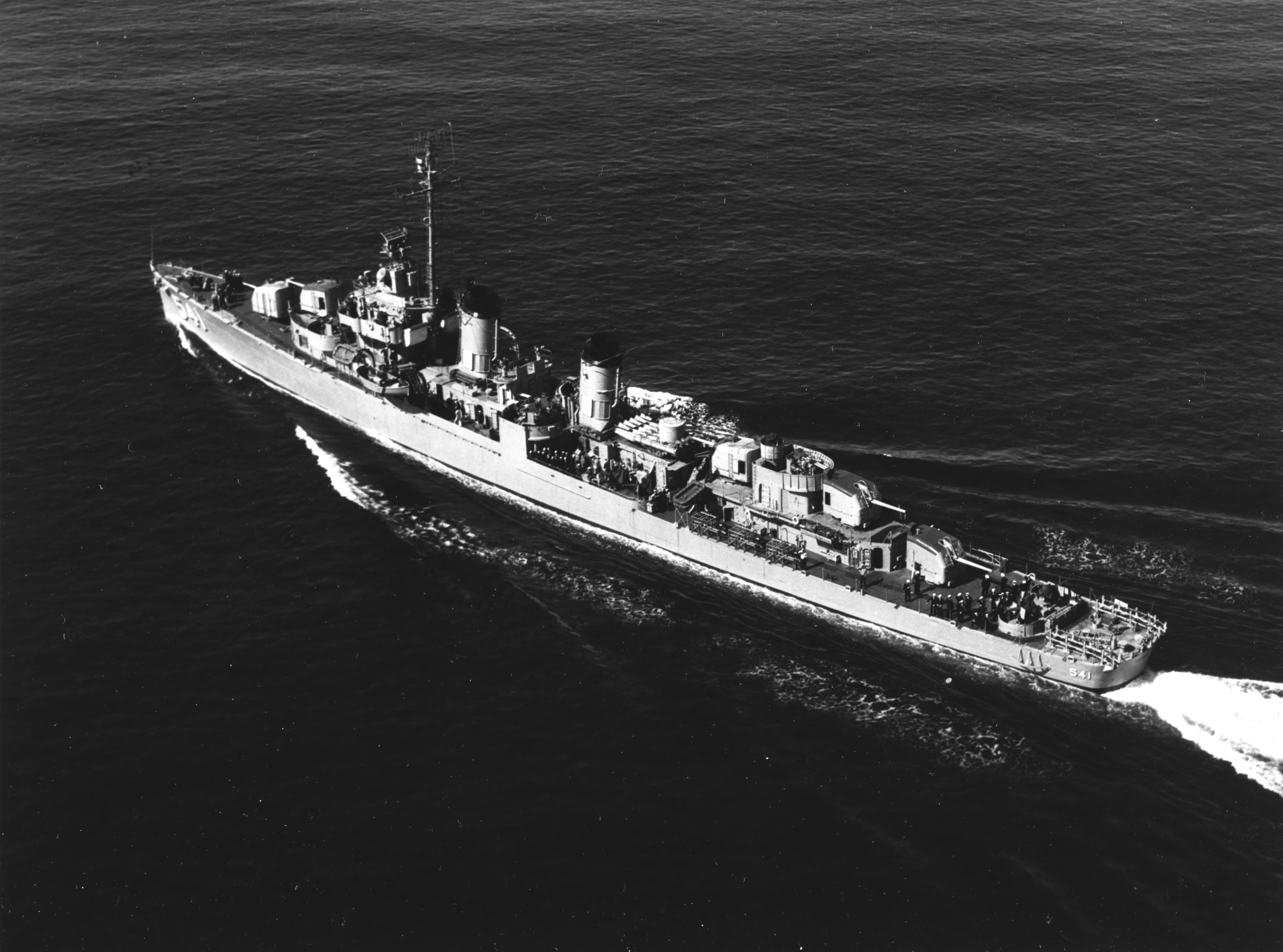
Yarnall underway in 1951

Her first Korean War deployment lasted until December. On 8 December, the destroyer departed Yokosuka and steamed via Midway and Pearl Harbor to San Diego where she arrived on the 21st. From there, she moved to Long Beach early in 1952 for an overhaul. The warship completed repairs early that summer and returned to San Diego on 11 June. A month and a day later, she departed San Diego; set a course via Pearl Harbor and Midway for the western Pacific; and arrived in Yokosuka on 6 August. On the 8th, she again got underway and, after an overnight stop at Sasebo on 10 and 11 August, headed for the Korean operating area. Again, her duties consisted of screening TF 77 carriers and providing bombardment services, frequently at the besieged port city of Wonsan. As during the previous deployment, she alternated tours of duty in Korean waters with port calls at Japanese ports for repairs, upkeep, rest, and relaxation. Later, in November, she returned to the Taiwan Strait patrol before resuming her tours of duty with TF 77 and on the bombline. On 30 January 1953, she concluded her second Korean War deployment by departing Sasebo for the United States. Steaming via Midway and Pearl Harbor, Yarnall arrived in San Diego on 16 February.

While Yarnall was back in the US, hostilities in Korea ended when the Korean Armistice Agreement was signed on 27 July 1953. The warship, however, continued to make annual deployments to the Far East and frequently operated in Korean waters with TF 77. She continued to alternate deployments to the Orient with periods of normal operations out of San Diego until September 1958, when she was decommissioned. Berthed at Stockton, California, Yarnall remained inactive for almost a decade.

=== Service in the Republic of China ===
On 10 June 1968, the ship was transferred, on a loan basis, to the Republic of China Navy which she served as ROCS Kun Yang (DD-19). She was returned to the United States Navy in 1974 for disposal. Her name was struck from the Navy list on 25 January 1974, and she was transferred back to R.O.C. by sale.

The ship number was changed to DD-934 in January 1976, and then to fixed ship number DD-919 on 1 October 1979. On 2 November 1982 the ship was modernized and become a missile destroyer, DDG-919.

She was decommissioned 16 October 1999 and stricken on 11 November of the same year. She was towed out to sea and sunk as target off Yilan. The ship's mast and dinghy is on display at the Matou Military History Park, Tainan. One of her life boat is on display at the 823 Artillery Battle Memorial Park.

== Awards ==
Yarnall (DD-541) earned seven battle stars during World War II and two battle stars during the Korean War.

== See also ==
See USS Yarnall for other ships of the same name.
