= Board of Navy Commissioners =

US Navy administrative body (1815–42)

The Board of Navy Commissioners was a United States Navy administrative body in existence from 1815 to 1842, with responsibility for the navy's material support. The three-member board was created as part of an expansion of the U.S. Navy Department at the end of the War of 1812. The system was implemented by Benjamin W. Crowninshield, Secretary of the Navy during the administrations of presidents James Madison and James Monroe.

Following the recommendations of William Jones, the establishment of the Board of Naval Commissioners by act of Congress on February 7, 1815 (3 Stat. 202), was the outgrowth of efforts to relieve the secretary of the Navy of some of responsibilities connected with the civilian functions of the navy, so he could devote more time to overall administration.

As naval warfare continued to increase in technical complexity, however, reformers began to consider that the three commissioners and a minimal staff were not enough to handle the navy's procurement needs. By the 1840s, it seemed that a functional approach was preferable—one which established bureaus or offices within the Navy Department to focus on specific areas such as shipbuilding or provisioning. This reform was finally achieved during the administration of President John Tyler, and implemented by his secretary of the Navy Abel P. Upshur. An Act of Congress on August 31, 1842 abolished the Board of Naval Commissioners and established the "bureau system" in the Department of the Navy. This system, with modifications, lasted until the mid-1960s.

== Establishment and responsibilities ==
The board had responsibility for the procurement of naval stores and materials; construction, armament, equipment, repair, and preservation of naval vessels; establishment of regulations to secure uniformity in the classes of naval vessels; preparation of estimates of expenditures for different parts of the naval service; and supervision of navy yards, naval stations, and navy agents. The Secretary of the Navy retained control over personnel and appointments, movement of ships, and other administrative matters not delegated to the board.

As provided by the act, the board, attached to the Office of the Secretary, was composed of three post-captains appointed by the president and confirmed by the Senate; the ranking officer of the board was to be its president. The board was authorized to establish its own regulations and employ a secretary to keep a record of its proceedings and two clerks to assist in other office work. Each commissioner was to receive $3,500 a year in lieu of wages, rations, and other pay due him as a naval officer.

== Personnel ==
=== Board presidents ===
During its existence the board had five presidents. All held the courtesy title of commodore; as the highest rank in the navy at that time was captain, and the rank of admiral did not come into existence until the American Civil War.

1. John Rodgers, 1815–1824; 1827–1837
2. William Bainbridge, 1824–1827
3. Isaac Chauncey, 1837–1840
4. Charles Morris, 1840–1841
5. Lewis Warrington, 1841–1842

Chauncey, Morris, and Warrington also served on the board prior to their appointments to its presidency. Chauncey served from 1822 to 1824 and 1833 to 1837; Morris from 1823 to 1825, 1826 to 1827, and 1832 to 1840; and Warrington from 1827 to 1830 and 1840 to 1841.

=== Other commissioners ===
The officers listed below served as the board's other commissioners. Likewise, all held the courtesy title of commodore.

1. Isaac Hull, April–November 1815
2. David Porter, 1815–1822
3. Stephen Decatur, 1815–1820
4. Jacob Nicholas Jones, 1824–1826
5. Thomas Tingey, October 1827
6. Daniel Todd Patterson, 1828–1832
7. Charles Stewart, 1830–1833
8. Alexander Scammel Wadsworth, 1837–1840
9. John B. Nicolson, 1840–1841
10. William Montgomery Crane, 1841–1842
11. David Conner, 1841–1842

=== Secretaries of the board ===
James Kirke Paulding—later Secretary of the Navy during the Van Buren administration—served as secretary of the board from 1815 to 1823. He was succeeded by the Navy Department's long-time chief clerk, Charles Washington Goldsborough.
