= Action of 22 May 1811 =

Date	22 May 1811
Location	Mediterranean Sea, close to North Africa
Result	Algerian victory

Belligerents
Regency of Algiers	Regency of Tunis

Commanders and leaders
Raïs Hamidou	Mohammed Mourali (WIA) (surrendered)

Units involved
Algerian fleet; Barbary Corsairs	Tunisian navy

Strength
4 frigates 2 brigs or xebecs 4 gunboats	12 warships

Casualties and losses
41 dead	230 dead Large frigate captured

The Action of 22 May 1811 was a naval engagement between an Algerian fleet commanded by Raïs Hamidou, and a Tunisian one commanded by Mohammed Mourali, also known as al-Mourali.

== Background ==
The relationship between the Beylik of Tunis, and the Deylik of Algiers was rather tense after dey Haji Ali was elected as the ruler of Algiers, and a war would soon be declared. While Ali amassed his forces on land, he entrusted the naval front to the Taifa of Raïs, a sort of company representing the Raïs (naval captains), and their interests.

Throughout 1810 and 1811, the Algerian admiral and pirate, Hamidou ben Ali, better known as Raïs Hamidou captured several Tunisian merchant ships, and a British merchantman which was carrying Tunisian goods.

These raids caused in total more than 144,000 francs in losses to the Tunisians.

Raïs Mohammed Mourali set out from Tunis with a fleet of 12 warships, while Hamidou yet again set out in hopes of capturing more loot. Mourali's fleet was considerably larger than the Algerian one, and thus when they saw each other in the distance, Mourali was sure in his victory.

== The Battle ==
The Algerian and Tunisian fleets met on 22 May, around 9 AM, near Bizerte.

While Hamidou's and Mourali's flagships met each other directly, the other ships of the fleet mostly abstained from fighting and only occasionally skirmished with each other.

The battle saw heavy use of maneuvers and more complex tactics, as both flagships attempted to outsmart each other. It went on for several hours with the first few hours being mostly them sizing up each other.

After about 6 hours of this fighting, the Tunisian warship was severely weakened, and its captain wounded badly. He surrendered, and lowered his flag. The other ships in the Tunisian fleets, seeing their leader capitulate attempted to liberate him, but after a few broadsides they retreated all the way to Monastir. The battle ended at around the time of the Asr prayer.

Hamidou captured the Tunisian frigate and brought her back to Algiers.
