= USS Spitfire (1814) =

History

United States
- Name: USS Spitfire
- Builder: Kemp
- Launched: 1812
- Acquired: by the Navy between October and December 1814
- In service: circa 20 May 1815
- Out of service: circa 1816
- Fate: Sold 3 April 1816; fate unknown

General characteristics
- Type: schooner
- Tons burthen: 286 (bm)
- Length: 106 ft (32 m) (between perpendiculars)
- Beam: 25 ft 6 in (7.77 m)
- Draft: 11 ft 8 in (3.56 m)
- Sail plan: Schooner
- Complement: Mercantile:40; Privateer:100; US Navy: 60
- Armament: Mercantile:6 × 9-pounder carronades; Privateer:12 cannons; US Navy: 2 × long 9-pounder guns; 1 × long 18-pounder gun; 8 × 18-pounder carronades

USS Spitfire was the former Baltimore privateer Grampus that the United States Navy purchased. She was a heavily armed schooner built for service in the War of 1812, but did not see service until the Barbary Wars when she was sent with the American fleet to the Mediterranean to force an end to piracy of American ships.

== Privateer ==
Grampus's captain was John Murphy. She was commissioned as a privateer on 12 February 1813.

As a privateer she captured or recaptured eight vessels:

- Catherine & William, brig, lost at sea
- Eclipse, brig, sent in
- Ceres, brig, burnt
- Expedition, ketch, New York
- Doris, brig, transport, Marblehead
- Speculator, brig, divested, given up
- Dry Harbor, schooner, sent in
- Brig, burnt

== Purchased for the War of 1812 ==
The third ship to be named Spitfire by the U.S. Navy, Spitfire was purchased at Baltimore, Maryland, about 21 December 1814 for service in a squadron commanded by Commodore David Porter which was to operate out of southern American ports against British shipping in the West Indies. However, the Treaty of Ghent ended the second American war with the United Kingdom (UK) before Porter could get the squadron to sea.

== Assigned to the Barbary Wars ==
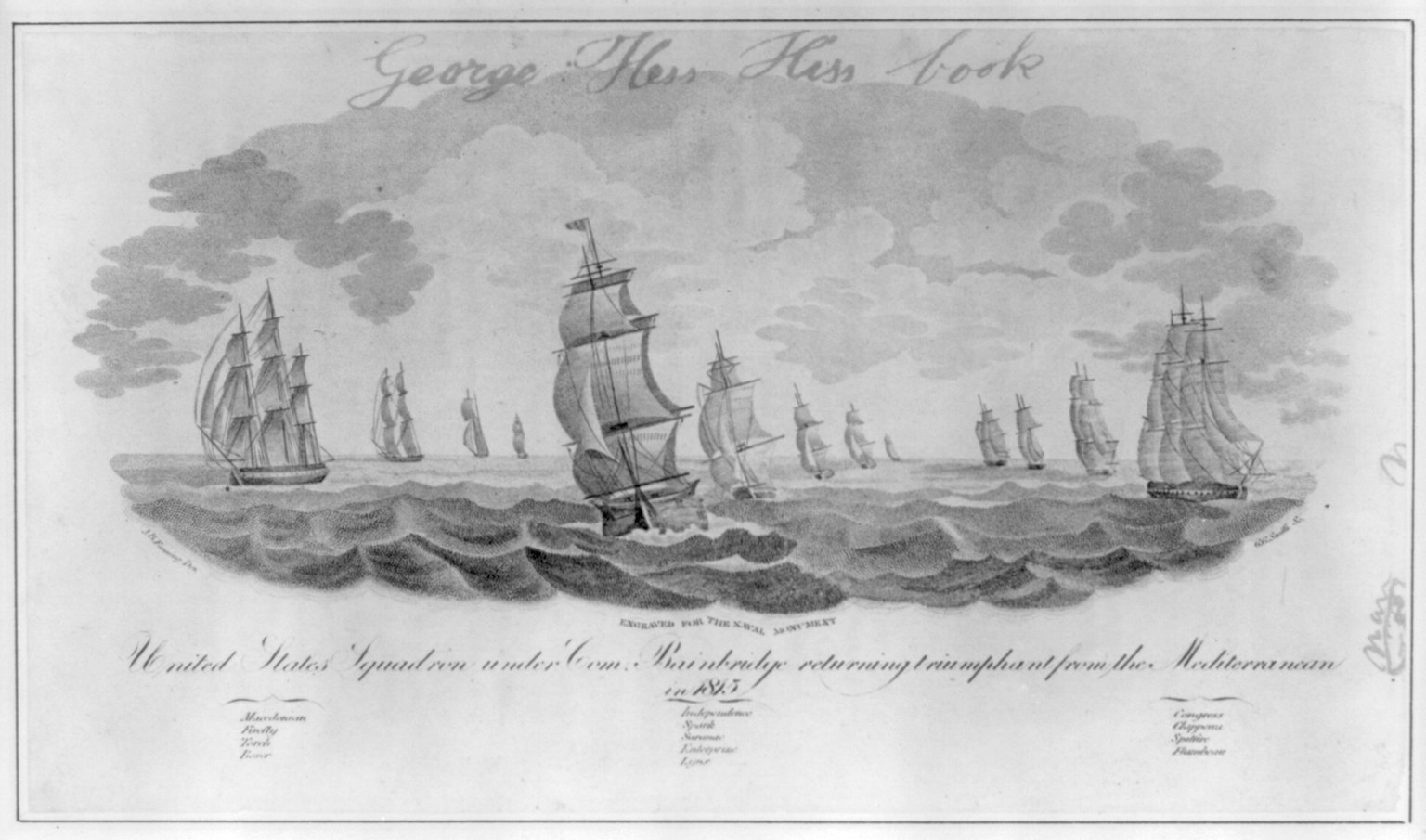
Spitfire as a part of the United States Mediterranean squadron of 1815 (Second Barbary War)

However, as the United States ended war with the UK, it was reopening hostilities with Algiers. As a result, the ships acquired for Porter's commerce raiding squadron were assigned to a squadron assembled for operations against the Barbary pirates, commanded by Commodore Stephen Decatur.

Spitfire departed New York City with the squadron 20 May 1815, and sailed to the Mediterranean. On 19 June, she helped Epervier, Spark, and Torch to chase Estedio ashore at Cape Palos and capture that Algerian brig.

Spitfire then sailed with the squadron to Algiers where its presence forced the Dey to agree to American terms.

The squadron then sailed, in turn, to Tunis and Tripoli and successfully demanded indemnities for violations of treaties with the United States during the recent American war with the UK.

In September, Spitfire headed home and was laid up until she was sold 3 April 1816.
