= USS Spark (1813) =

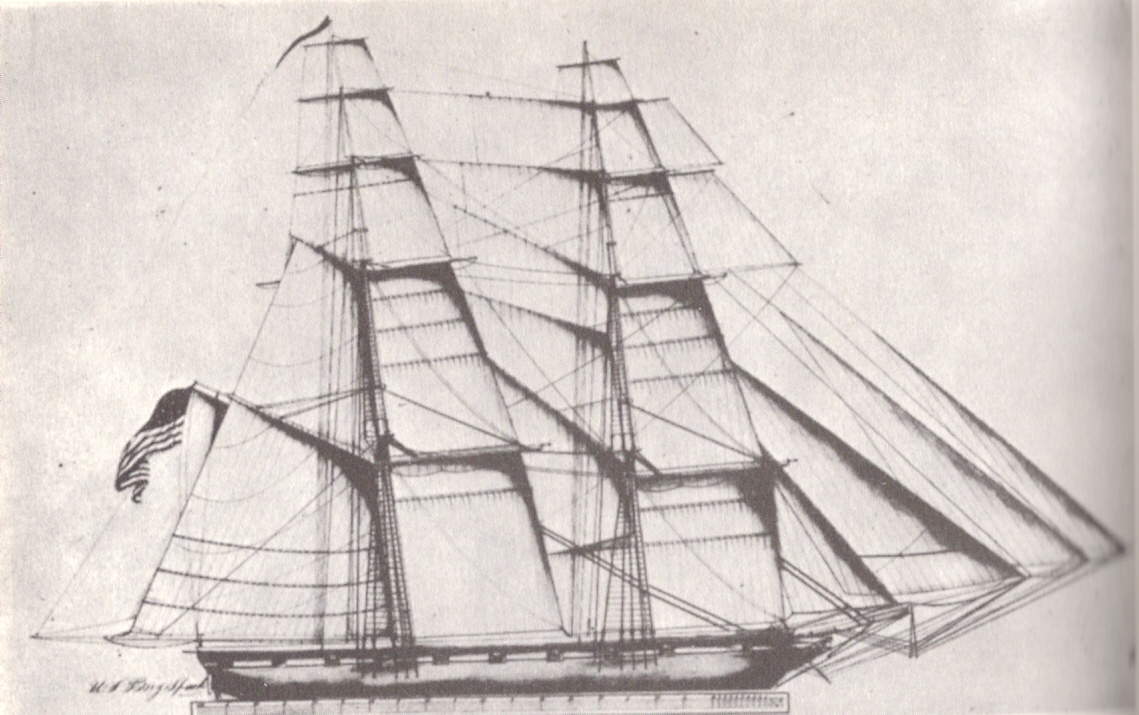
- Sail plan of USS Spark

History

United States
- Name: USS Spark
- Completed: 1813
- Acquired: 1814
- Commissioned: circa 20 May 1815
- Recommissioned: 1 July 1816
- Decommissioned: circa 1825
- Fate: sold 1826

General characteristics
- Type: Brig
- Displacement: 310 tons
- Length: 103 ft (31 m) (between perpendiculars)
- Beam: 25 ft 4 in (7.72 m)
- Draft: 12 ft 8 in (3.86 m)
- Propulsion: brig sail
- Complement: 90
- Armament: Two long 18-pounder guns; Ten 18-pounder carronades

USS Spark was a heavily armed brig in the services of the United States Navy, built for service in the War of 1812. However, she was completed too late for that war and was assigned, instead, to the Barbary Wars in the Mediterranean. After two voyages in support of that action, she was assigned to suppress pirates in the Caribbean, where she was successful in capturing a number of pirate ships and their crews.

== Service history ==
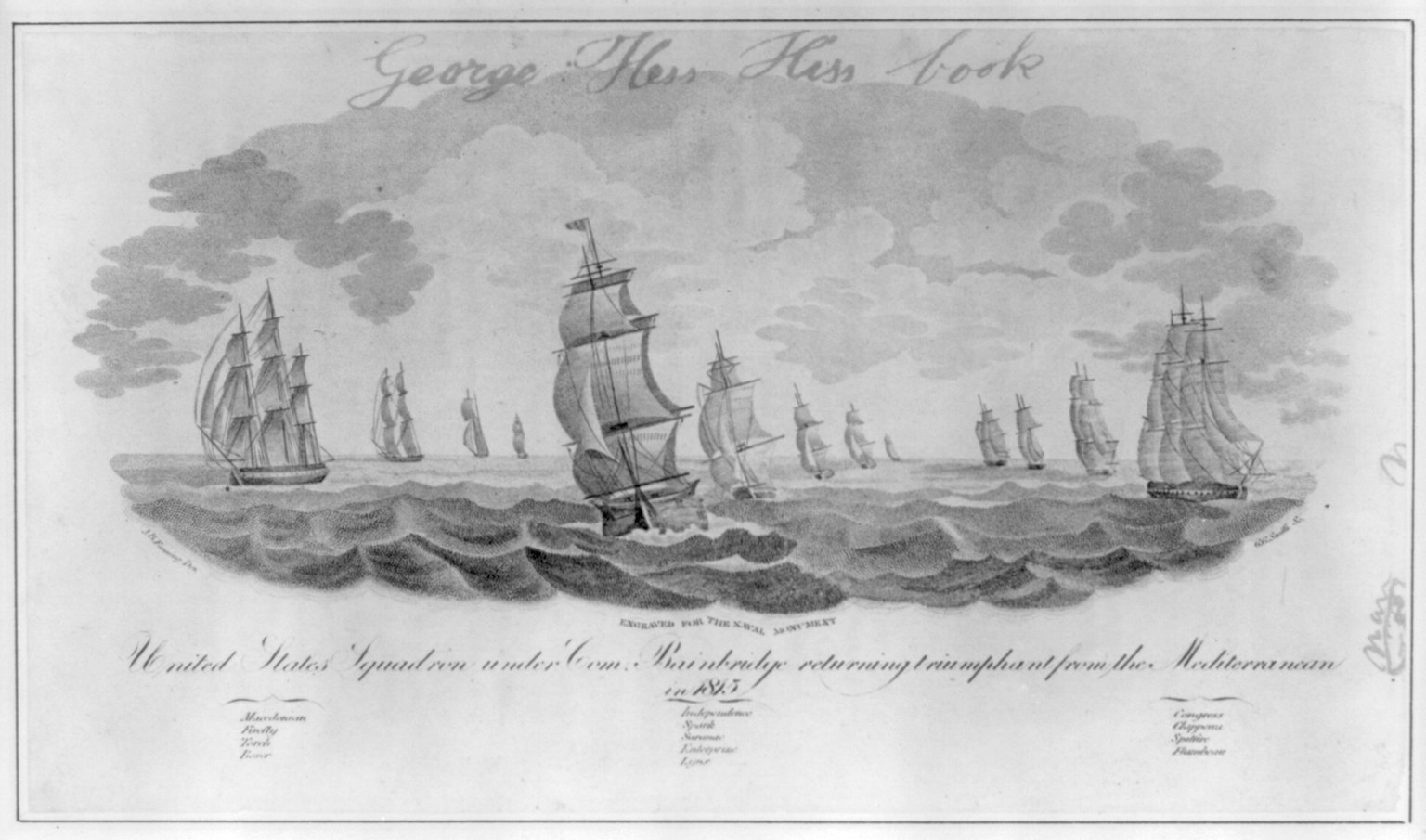
Spark as a part of the United States Mediterranean squadron of 1815 (Second Barbary War)

The first ship to be so named by the Navy, Spark—a privateer built in 1813 at the Rysam Boat Yard (est. 1797 reference Sag Harbor Historical Society) in Sag Harbor on Long Island, New York—was purchased by the Navy at Baltimore, Maryland, in 1814 for service in the war with the United Kingdom. However, the war ended before the brig could get to sea for active service against the Royal Navy. Spark, commanded by Lt. Thomas Gamble, departed New York City on 20 May 1815 and sailed for the Mediterranean for operations in Commodore Stephen Decatur's squadron against pirates of Algiers. She reached Gibraltar on 15 June and, two days later, helped in operations resulting in the capture of the Algerian flagship, Mashuda, near Cape de Gatt. On the 19th, she aided Epervier, Torch, and Spitfire in running Estedio ashore where she was boarded and captured. After cruising in the Mediterranean through the summer, Spark sailed for home on 6 October in a squadron commanded by Commodore William Bainbridge and reached Newport, Rhode Island, on 15 November and was laid up for repairs.

Recommissioned on 1 July 1816, the brig sailed again for the Mediterranean on 6 September carrying a letter from the President of the United States for the Dey of Algiers and orders appointing Commodore Isaac Chauncey and Consul-General Shalter commissioners to negotiate for peace. Spark cruised in the Mediterranean until returning home in 1821.

In the autumn of 1821, Spark, now commanded by Lt. John H. Elton, departed Boston, Massachusetts, for the Caribbean for operations against pirates. In January 1822, he captured a Dutch sloop and brought her and seven pirates to Charleston, South Carolina, for trial. She returned to the Caribbean and spent over three years suppressing buccaneers. The brig returned home in 1825. That year enslaved seaman James Hutton, through his attorney Francis Scott Key brought a freedom suit against Lt. William J. Belt, USN. Judge William Cranch of the District of Columbia Court, in his verdict, found that Lt. Belt by his action in enrolling James Hutton as an Ordinary Seaman aboard USS Columbus, and USS Spark (1813) was sufficient evidence of "implied manumission" and subsequently accorded Hutton his freedom. In reaching a decision, the court relied on muster rolls of both vessels and the letter of Commodore William Bainbridge dated 6 June 1825. In 1826 the USS Spark was sold at New York City.
