= USS Yarnall =

Two ships of the United States Navy have borne the name USS Yarnall, in honor of Lieutenant John Yarnall (1786–1815).

- The first, USS Yarnall (DD-143), was a Wickes-class destroyer, launched in 1918 and transferred to the Royal Navy in 1940. She served as HMS Lincoln until 1942, then as HMCS Lincoln until 1944. She was then transferred to the Soviet Navy to provide parts for other destroyers.
- The second, USS Yarnall (DD-541), was a Fletcher-class destroyer, launched in 1943 and transferred to the Republic of China Navy in 1968. She served as ROCS Kun Yang (DD-8/DDG-919) until 1999.
