= USS Molala =

Tugboat of the United States Navy

USS Molala (ATF-106)
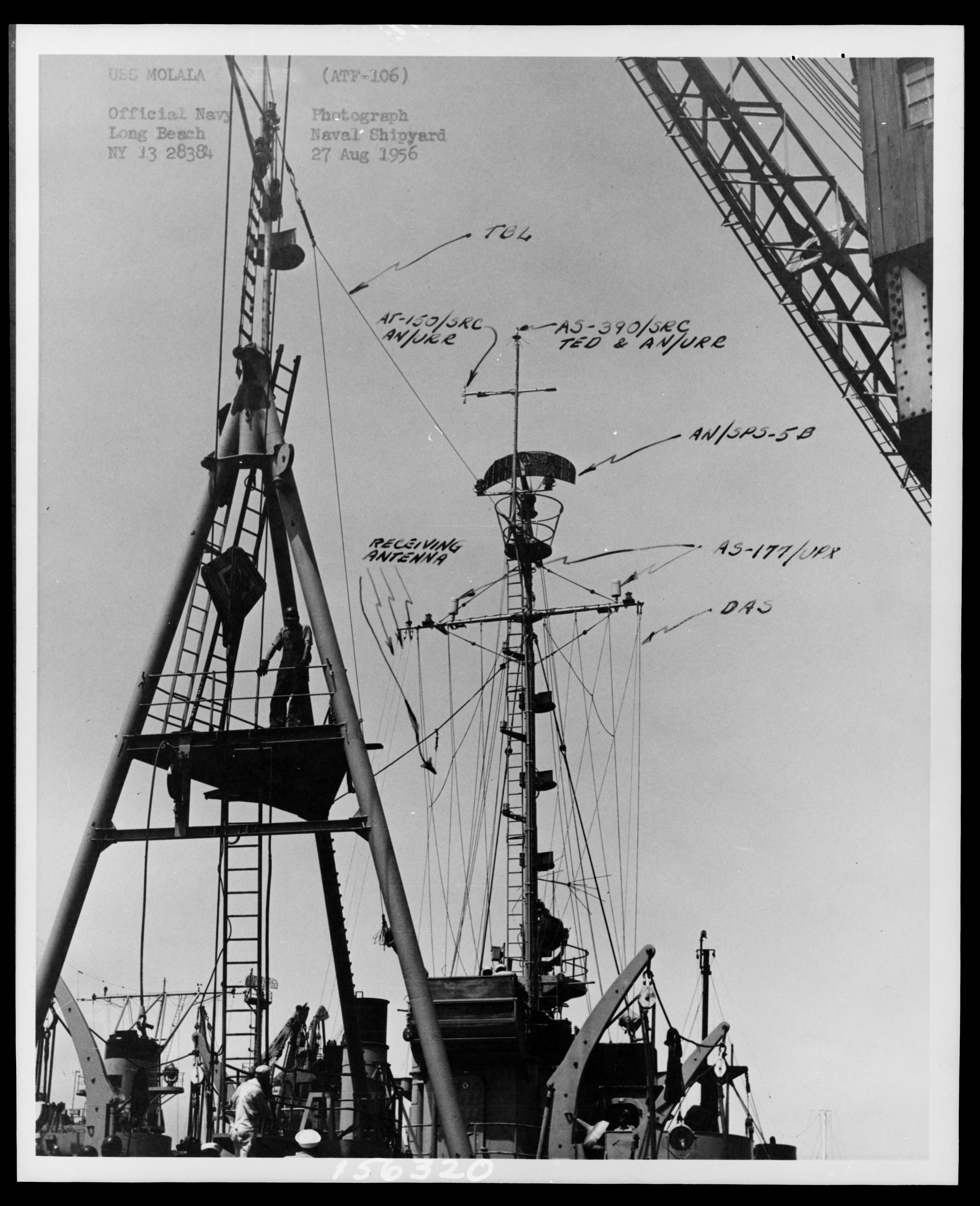
- Molala's masts seen while the ship was docked in Long Beach Naval Shipyard, 27 August 1956.

History

United States
- Namesake: Molala people
- Builder: United Engineering Co.
- Laid down: 26 July 1942
- Launched: 23 December 1942
- Sponsored by: Miss Molly Fay
- Commissioned: 29 September 1943
- Decommissioned: 1 August 1978
- Reclassified: ATF‑106 15 May 1944
- Stricken: 1 August 1978
- Fate: Sold to Mexico

Mexico
- Name: Otomi
- Acquired: 1 August 1978
- Renamed: Kukulkan
- Status: In service as of 2017

General characteristics
- Class & type: Abnaki-class tugboat
- Displacement: 1330 tons
- Length: 205 ft (62 m)
- Beam: 38 ft 6 in (11.73 m)
- Draft: 14 ft (4.3 m)
- Propulsion: Single screw 3,000 shp (2,200 kW)
- Speed: 16.5 knots (30.6 km/h; 19.0 mph)
- Complement: 85
- Armament: 1 × single 3 in (76 mm) cal; 2 × single 40 mm AA; 2 × single 20 mm AA

USS Molala (AT-106/ATF-106) was a US Navy Abnaki-class tugboat, named after the Molala people of Oregon.

She was laid down as AT‑106 on 26 July 1942, by United Engineering Co., of Alameda, California; launched 23 December 1942; sponsored by Miss Molly Fay; and commissioned 29 September 1943.

== Service history ==
Following shakedown off California, Molala steamed to Hawaii, arriving at Pearl Harbor 14 December 1943. Between February and June 1944, she operated from the Marshall Islands, towing damaged ships to Pearl Harbor. During that time, she was reclassified ATF‑106, effective 15 May. After taking part in the Battle of Saipan, she continued towing and salvage operations between the Marianas and Gilberts, returning 2 September 1944 to Pearl Harbor. Assigned to the Third Fleet, Molala was involved in the Battle of Luzon in November 1944. She departed Ulithi 29 December, supporting Third Fleet China Sea operations, returning 27 January 1945.

Reassigned to the Fifth Fleet, she joined a carrier group in February 1945, striking at Tokyo in support of the Iwo Jima invasion. She arrived Ulithi 7 March with USS Yarnall (DD-541) in tow, and four days later fought a fire on USS Randolph (CV-15). For almost a month she rendered valuable assistance to the Okinawa invasion forces, performing her duties despite the threat of Kamikaze suicide attacks. She departed Kerama Retto 6 May 1945, and spent the next three months between the Philippines and Marianas. She arrived Japan 4 September 1945 for occupation duty before returning to the West Coast.

Between 1947 and 1952, she was assigned duties in the Hawaiian Islands, Alaska, and WESTPAC. In 1953 she steamed to Korea, to aid in the struggle against Communist aggression, arriving in October. She conducted diving operations until the cessation of hostilities. For the next three years she operated off Alaska and the West Coast. She steamed to the Far East 4 February 1957, returning 19 July to San Diego.

Molala spent the next seven years making regular deployments to northern and western Pacific waters. In September 1964, she patrolled the troubled waters off South Vietnam returning to Vietnam in the winter of 1965 to carry out salvage work before steaming to the West Coast the following year. She departed San Diego 4 January 1967 for WESTPAC duty, during which time she again entered Vietnamese waters, returning 29 July to San Diego. She departed San Diego April 1968, for another tour of duty in the Far East, and operated off Japan into 1969.

In 1975, USS Molala won the Pacific Fleet's Marjorie Sterrett Battleship Fund Award.

On 1 August 1978, she was decommissioned, stricken from the Naval Register, and sold to Mexico under the Security Assistance Program. In Mexican service, who was named ARM Otomi (A-17), and later renamed ARM Kukulkan (A-52). She was afloat as of 2017.

== Honors and awards ==
Molala received five battle stars for World War II service, three for Korean service, and four campaign stars for Vietnam War service.

== See also ==
- List of Auxiliaries of the United States Navy: Fleet Ocean Tugs (ATF, T-ATF)
