= John B. Nicolson =

American naval officer

John B. Nicolson (c. 1783 – November 9, 1846) was an officer in the United States Navy during the first half of the 19th century.

Nicolson was born in and a native of Richmond, Virginia. He entered the Navy as a midshipman on July 4, 1805. He served on the brig USS Hornet, commanded by Isaac Chauncey. Nicolson was promoted to lieutenant on May 20, 1812, while serving aboard the brig USS Flambeau, part of the Mediterranean Squadron during the Second Barbary War.

During the War of 1812, he served as fourth lieutenant aboard the USS United States during the battle with HMS Macedonian. He also served as first lieutenant on USS Peacock under Commandant Lewis Warrington, and took part in the victory over HMS Epervier off the coast of Florida. After the British vessel surrendered, Nicolson took Epervier back to the United States as a prize of war.

Nicolson was promoted to master commandant on March 5, 1817, and to captain on April 24, 1828. He was nominated by President Martin Van Buren to serve on the Board of Navy Commissioners, the administrative body which handled procurement and supply in the United States Department of the Navy. Nicolson, who filled the vacancy left by the death of Isaac Chauncey, served in the position from May 12, 1840, until April 29, 1841. As one of the Navy's most senior captains, Nicolson was known by the courtesy rank of commodore.

Nicolson died on November 9, 1846, at the age of 63. He is buried at the Congressional Cemetery in Washington, D.C.
