= Mashouda =

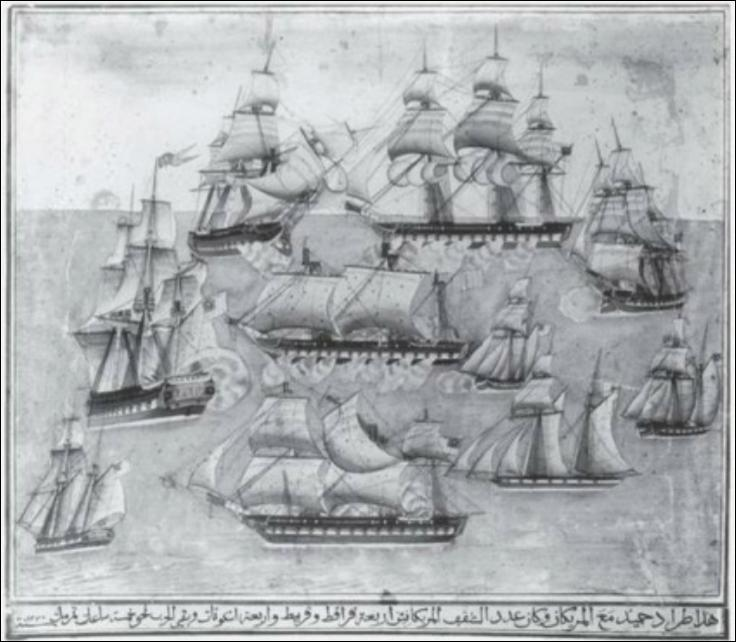
Mashouda surrounded by the American fleet in 1815

The Mashouda or Meshuda was the Algerian fleet flagship of admiral Raïs Hamidou during the Second Barbary War. Commodore Stephen Decatur Jr. of the United States Navy captured her in June 1815 at the Battle off Cape Gata. This created a favorable American position from which to bargain with the Dey of Algiers.

Lloyd's List reported that the Algerian frigate Mezoura, which had been under the command of the Algerine admiral, had arrived at Cartagena on 20 June 1815 as a prize to Decatur's squadron. The newspaper also reported that Decatur's squadron had run another Algerian frigate onshore near Cartagena.

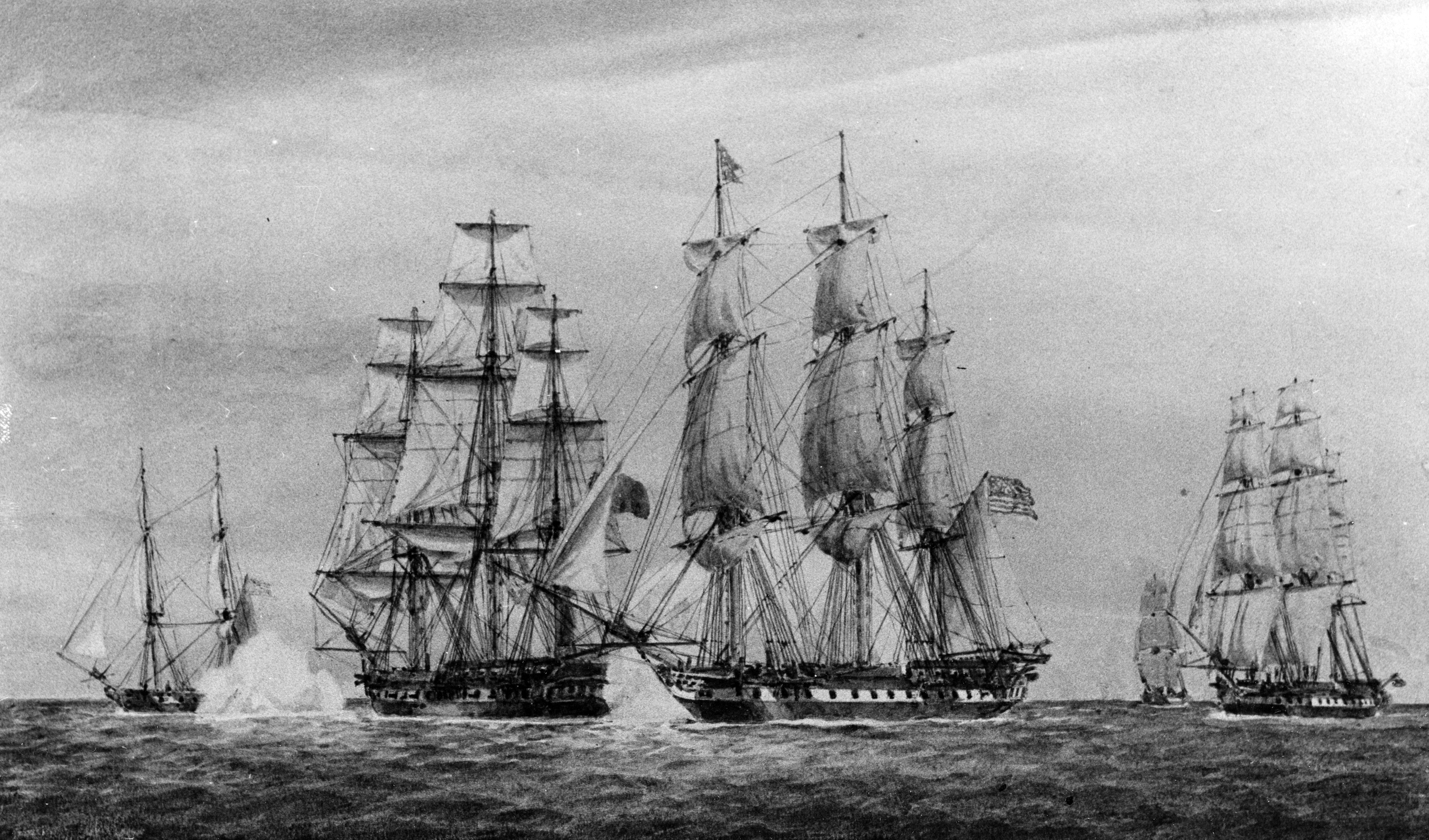
Commodore Decatur's squadron capturing the Algerine pirate ship Mashuda, on 17 June 1815

The Spanish government interned Mashouda and returned her to Algiers at the end of the war. However, on 18 July 1815 the Algerines declared war on Spain so the Spanish government seized both her and the brig Estedio, which Decatur had captured at the Battle of Cape Palos.

== See also ==
- List of ships captured in the 19th century
