= Raïs Hamidou =

Algerian corsair (c. 1770–1815)

Raïs Hamidou Ben Ali
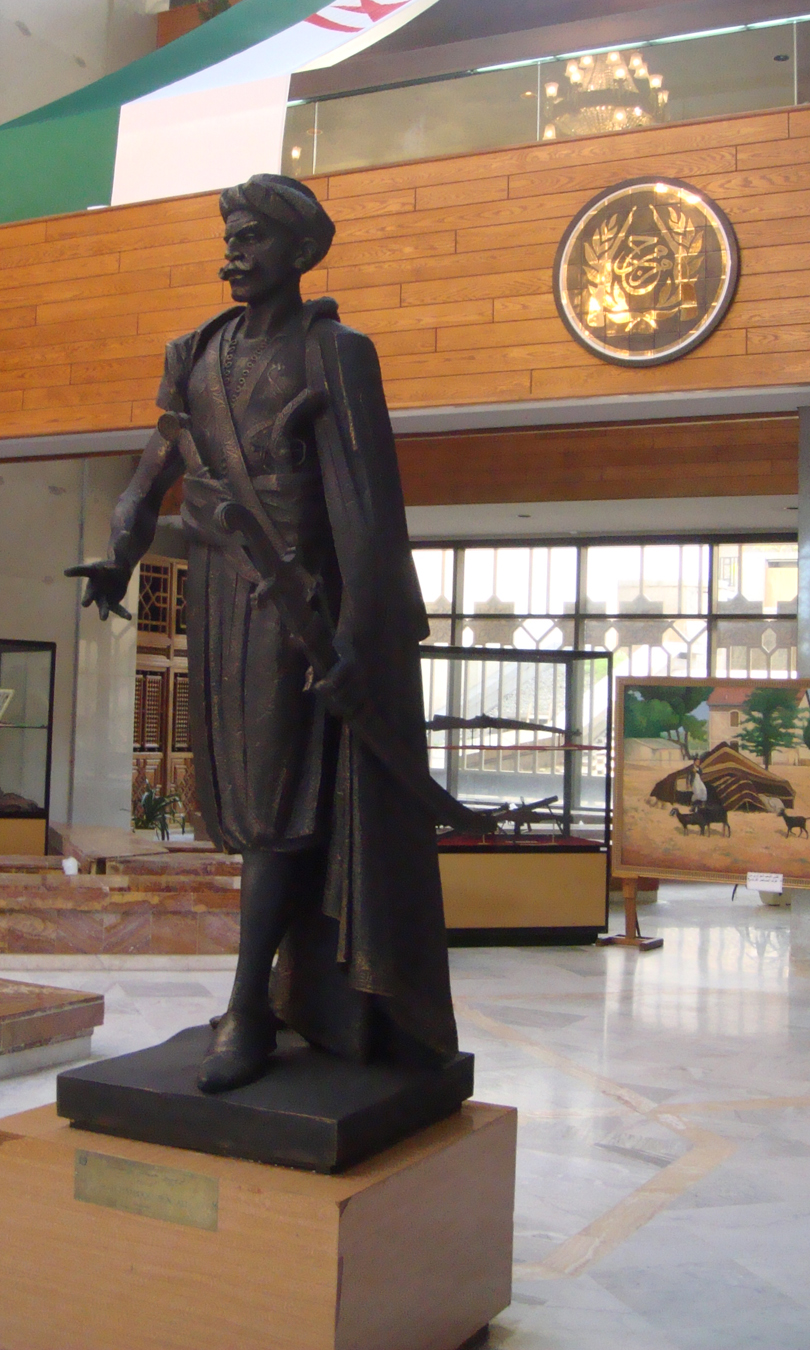
- Statue of Hamidou in the Algerian Central Military Museum
- Born: Hamidou ben Ali; 1770; Casbah of Algiers
- Died: June 17, 1815 (aged 44–45); Off Cape Gata, Mediterranean Sea
- Spouse: Meriouma bent Ahmed
- Military career
- Allegiance: State of Algiers
- Branch: Algerian Navy: Taifa of the Rais
- Service years: 1795–1815
- Rank: Admiral
- Nicknames: ʾAmīr al-biḥār (Admiral of the seas); Amidon; Hamuda
- Commands: Meshuda; Portuguesa; Stedio
- Wars and battles: American–Algerian War; French invasion of Egypt and Syria; Barbary–Portuguese conflicts; Action of 27 May 1802; Tunisian–Algerian Wars; Action of 22 May 1811; Second Barbary War; Battle off Cape Gata †
- Memorials: Algerian National Navy Corvette Rais Hamidou (801) Nanuchka-class; Commune of Raïs Hamidou, Algiers; Palace of Raïs Hamidou, El Biar; Operational cooperation activity “ RAIS HAMIDOU DIVER-20”

Hamidou ben Ali, known as Raïs Hamidou (Arabic: الرايس حميدو), or Amidon in American literature (c. 1770 – June 17, 1815), was an Algerian Admiral. As a state-sanctioned pirate and slaver he is credited with capturing up to 200 ships during his career. He was one of the last powerful Algerian figures prior to the French invasion.

== Origins ==
He was the son of a man named Ali. According to some sources, his father was an artisan tailor in Algiers.

Hamidou was reportedly of Kabyle (Zouaoua) origin. According to documents discovered by the archivist Albert Devoulx, he "belonged to a class of Arabs settled in the cities for a more or less long time, which the Europeans called Moors". Despite this, after the battle off Cape Gata, his captured officers and crew said that he was Kabyle during an interview with their American captors. He is also described as a “native Algerian” by European sources.

At age 10 he started working aboard a pirate ship commanded by Raïs Memmou as a cabin boy. There he learned many different things, and he gained much experience from it.

== Career as Rais ==
There are no documents on the activity of Raïs Hamidou during his early years as a pirate captain in Algiers, but we can assume that he was under the tutelage of an older privateer, and that he was doing his apprenticeship. After passing the exam set by the taifa des raïs (a council of pirate captains of Algiers), he was allowed to become a raïs himself. His first success came shortly after his appointment, when he successfully guided his ship from seemingly certain defeat at the hands of a much larger Spanish foe.

After Oran was recaptured in 1792, the then-bey of Oran Mohammed el Kebir appointed Hamidou as chief of the Oranese navy, both a defense and a privateer fleet. At the time the navy of Oran consisted of three xebecs, and several feluccas. Dey Sidi Hassan also granted him another three-masted xebec.

In 1795 or 1796, after returning from a raid in Italy he was caught in a storm and anchored at La Calle, a French outpost in nominally Algerian territory. His anchors broke and his ship was smashed against the rocks of the shore. This event nearly ruined Hamidou's career. The loss of a ship entrusted to a raïs was most often very severely punished. He decided not to make his report, and was caught and brought back by force to Algiers. But he was able to calm the anger of the dey and soon, he had a frigate built by the Spanish Maestro Antonio, a renegade carpenter in Algiers.

In 1797 a corvette of the dey of Algiers returned to the port without displaying the Algerian flag or saluting the mosque of Sidi Abderrahman, patron of the city of Algiers. This symbolic act meant the loss of its captain either in battle, or desertion. In fact the latter, having many misdeeds and serious navigation errors to be forgiven, the captain had preferred to desert, and took refuge in Morocco. The dey, wishing to reward Hamidou for his recent successes, appointed him to the command of the vessel. Hamidou is mentioned regularly in the register of catches, especially involving Genoese, Venetian, Neapolitan and Greek vessels.

On March 8, 1802, after a few days of cruising, Hamidou, commanding a xebec of 40 guns, met a Portuguese warship of 44 guns. Aware of the military superiority of the Portuguese frigate, he hoisted a British flag. The Portuguese let themselves be approached by the Algerians, and realized far too late that they were facing pirates. The Algerians boarded and devastated the ship. 282 Portuguese were taken prisoner. The corsairs captured the ship.

The frigate became part of the Algerian fleet under the name of Al-Burtughāliyya ('The Portuguese'). Hamidou was given an honorary yatagan, and was received in solemn audience. The Portuguese frigate was not the only one that the Algerians or Hamidou captured. On 28 May the same year, Hamidou captured another Portuguese war frigate of 36 guns. These successes earned the Rais the title of the admiral of the Algerian fleet, and his own villa in El Biar from Hussein Khodja who later became Dey.

For nearly two years, Hamidou's name ceased to appear on the prize register because of internal problems and rivalry with the Odjak, and the jealousy of the new dey. In 1808, one of the first acts of the new dey, Ali III ar-Rasul, was to exile Hamidou, whose popularity he saw as a threat. Hamidou was sent into exile in Beirut, but Hadj Ali Dey, who came to power in 1809, invited him back and reappointed him to all of his previous positions.

Back in Algiers, he received the command of a division of four ships, a 44-gun frigate he commanded himself, a 44-gun frigate commanded by Raïs Ali Gharnaout, The Portuguese, the aforementioned 44-gun frigate commanded by the Raïs Ahmad Zmirli, and a brig of 20 guns, commanded by Raïs Mustapha, a Maltese renegade. The dey authorized him to cross into the Atlantic Ocean, which Raïs Hamidou did under the cover of night . The Algerian squadron captured three Portuguese ships. The Portuguese signed a peace treaty with the Algerians in 1810, paying heavy compensation.

In 1811, a war broke out between the deylik of Algiers and the beylik of Tunis. On 10 October 1811, Hamidou captured a British merchant ship containing Tunisian goods. On May 22, with a fleet of six warships and four gunboats, he captured a Tunisian frigate, which he brought back to Algiers after a tough fight against a fleet of twelve Tunisian warships in the Action of 22 May 1811.

Following this naval battle, Hamidou received an ovation after the dey complimented him in open court. Hamidou recorded a number of other successes between 1812 and 1815. He took part in attacks against ships from Greece, Kingdom of the Two Sicilies, Sweden, Holland, Denmark, and Spain. According to some sources, during his career, he seized a total of more than 200 sailboats.

== Death ==
He died in 1815 after being ambushed by an American fleet during the US-Algerian war.

== See also ==
- Tunisian–Algerian War (1807)

== Sources ==
- John de Courcy Ireland (1974), "Raïs Hamidou: The Last of the Great Algerian Corsairs", The Mariner’s Mirror, 60(2), 187–196.
- Devoulx, Albert (1859). Le raïs Hamidou: notice biographique sur le plus célèbre corsaire algérien du XIIIe siècle de l'hégire (PDF). Dubos Frères.
- Paul Desprès, Raïs Hamidou : Le dernier corsaire barbaresque d'Alger, Harmattan, mars 2007
- H. D. de Grammont, Histoire d'Alger sous la domination turque, Paris 1887
