= Battle of Cape Palos (1815) =

Coordinates: 37.6206°N 0.6564°W

- Part of Second Barbary War
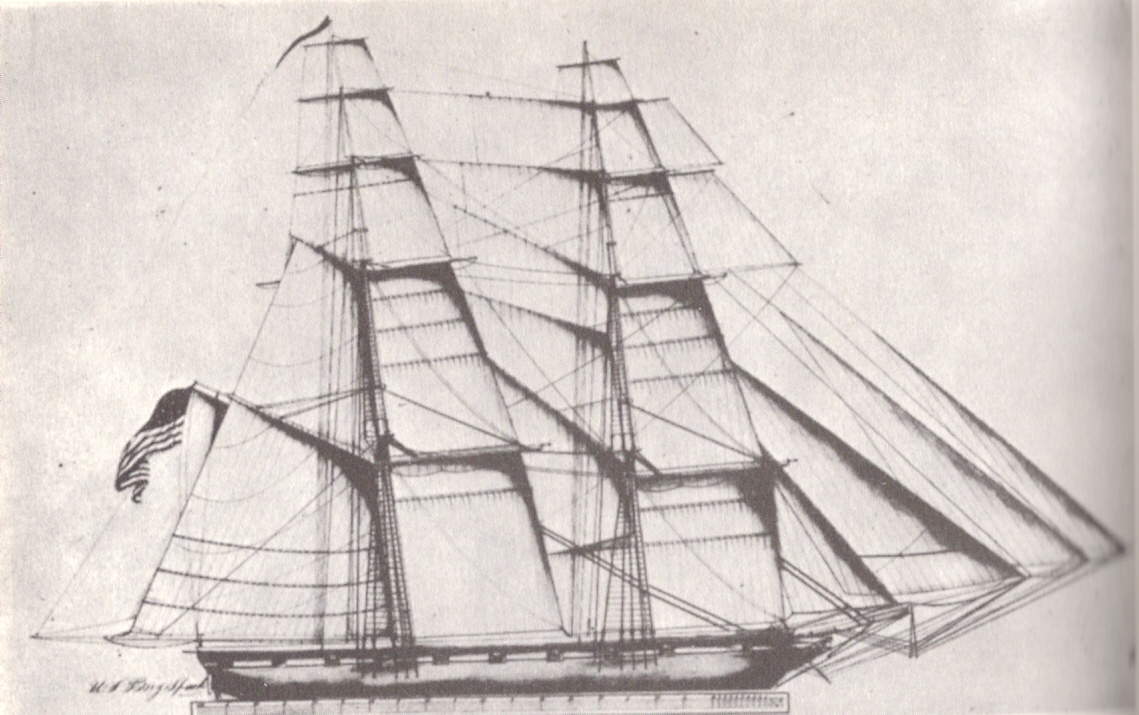
- Sail plan of the United States Navy brig
Date	June 19, 1815
Location	Off Cape Palos (Spain), Mediterranean Sea
Result	American victory

Belligerents
United States	Regency of Algiers

Commanders and leaders
Stephen Decatur, Jr.	Unknown

Strength
1 sloop 1 brigantine 2 schooners	1 brig

Casualties and losses
None	23 killed ~80 captured 1 brig captured 1 boat sunk

The Battle of Cape Palos was the last battle of the Second Barbary War. The battle began when an American squadron under Commodore Stephen Decatur Jr. attacked and captured an Algerian brig.

== Background ==
After capturing the Algerian flagship Meshuda and sending her to Cartagena under the escort of USS Macedonian, Stephen Decatur and his squadron continued on their way towards Algiers. On June 19, 1815, they sighted the 22-gun Algerian brig Estedio.

== Battle ==
Decatur began pursuit of Estedio and chased her into shoal waters near the coast of Spain off Cape Palos. Fearing that his larger vessels might get beached, he sent the smaller vessels in his squadron, the USS Epervier, USS Spark, USS Torch, and USS Spitfire to deal with the brig. Here the vessels fought half an hour before the Algerians began to abandon their vessel and surrender. As Estedio's crew members began to flee towards the cape in her boats, the American vessels fired on them, sinking them. The surviving 80 crewmen of Estedio surrendered. Besides the 80 captured, Estedio lost at least 23 men killed.

== Aftermath ==
After the battle, a prize crew took Estedio to Cartagena, where Spanish authorities interned her. They returned her to Algiers at the end of the war, but then on July 18, 1815 the Algerians declared war on Spain so the Spanish government seized both her and the frigate Mashouda, which Decatur had also captured, at Cartagena.

Decatur's squadron regrouped and continued on its way to Algiers to force Dey Omar Agha to terms.

== Sources ==
- Dobbs, John F. (April 1, 2005). From Bunker Hill to Manila Bay. Kessinger Publishing. ISBN 978-1-4179-3704-2.
- Leiner, Frederick C. (May 1, 2006). The End of Barbary Terror: America's 1815 War against the Pirates of North Africa. Oxford University Press. ISBN 978-0-19-804095-8.
