= USS Ontario (1813) =

Sloops-of-war of the United States Navy

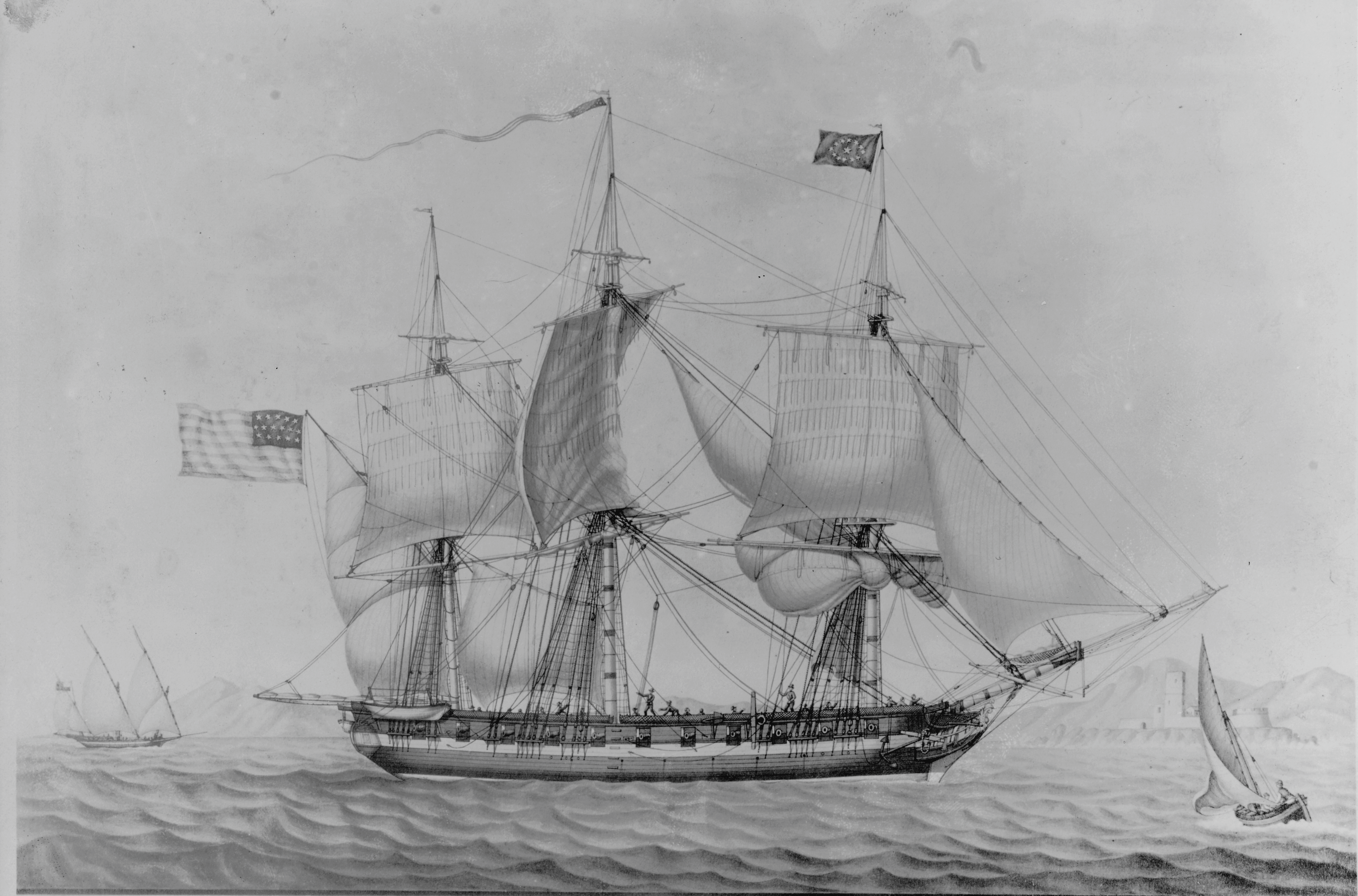
- Engraving of USS Ontario

History

United States
- Name: USS Ontario
- Builder: Thomas Kemp, Baltimore, Maryland
- Laid down: 1813
- Fate: Sold 15 July 1856

General characteristics
- Type: Sloop-of-war
- Displacement: 509 long tons (517 t)
- Length: 117 ft 11 in (35.94 m)
- Beam: 31 ft 6 in (9.60 m)
- Draft: 16 ft (4.9 m)
- Propulsion: Sail
- Complement: 150
- Armament: 18 × 32-pounder carronades; 2 × 18-pounder guns

The second USS Ontario was a three-masted, wooden-hulled sloop of war in the United States Navy, bearing 16 guns, and saw service during and following the years of the War of 1812 and in the Second Barbary War. Ontario was built by Thomas Kemp, Baltimore, Maryland, in 1813; blockaded in the Chesapeake Bay through the War of 1812; and sailed from New York for the Mediterranean on 20 May 1815, Master Commandant Jesse D. Elliott in command. (Note: Not to be confused with the first Ontario built in 1812 at Lake Ontario, or the third Ontario, built in 1912 at New Jersey.) (Note: Kemp later claimed to have built the ship at a loss due to the British blockade of the Chesapeake Bay and petitioned Congress for remuneration of $6,223.12, which Congress denied.)

== Second Barbary War ==
Ontario arrived at Gibraltar on 15 June 1815 and joined Commodore Stephen Decatur's ten ship squadron sent there to put a stop to the piracy of the Barbary states of Tripoli and Algiers that had plagued the Mediterranean for many years. Present in the fleet was the frigates Constellation and Guerriere and sloop Epervier, the latter being used to sail home with the signed treaty. Ontario then began serving in the blockade off Algiers and continued through June when the Dey of Algiers finally and reluctantly agreed to sign a peace with Decatur. The sloop along with the squadron then sailed to Tripoli and Tunis to demand indemnities for pirated prizes and continued operating in protection of American shipping interests until departing for home, arriving at New York in early 1817.

== Pacific ==
On 4 October the Ontario, under the command of Captain James Biddle sailed to the Pacific station on a pioneer mission, stopping at Rio de Janeiro, to deliver dispatches. The sloop then sailed around Cape Horn and proceeded to Valparaíso, Chile, in early 1818. The Chilean War of Independence at this time was in full swing and a Spanish blockade of Valparaíso had been declared, with American merchantmen ships being seized. Through diplomatic negotiations with authorities at that port, Captain Biddle succeeded in achieving the release of captured U.S. ships, and then departed north, arriving off Cape Disappointment on the Columbia River on 19 August. There the ship claimed both sides of the river for the United States and next sailed south, touching at Monterey, California, for supplies, becoming the first American naval vessel to visit the three future Pacific coast states. Ontario sailed for home that fall, stopping at Valparaíso en route in time to witness the start of Lord Cochrane's campaign at sea against Spain, and stood into the Chesapeake Bay finally on 23 April 1819.

== Mediterranean Squadron ==
On 18 January 1821, Ontario departed New York Harbor on her next voyage, sailing for the Mediterranean Sea after stopping at the West Indies. She arrived at Gibraltar, joining Commodore William Bainbridge's squadron on 4 June and stayed in those waters for over two and one-half years. The ship returned to New York on 25 January 1824, and following a six months refitting sailed for a second extended deployment with the Mediterranean Squadron on 24 July. Ontario returned home on 20 February 1828 and then made two more trips to the Mediterranean from August 1829 to May 1832 and November 1833 to June 1836.

== West Indies and Home Squadrons ==
She next sailed for the West Indies on 19 August 1837 and operated on station there, until it was merged with the Home Squadron in 1838, through the spring of 1840. The warship spent most of her time protecting U.S. commerce from pirate attacks, showing the flag in Caribbean ports, and operating out of Havana and Pensacola protecting American neutrality during French intervention in Mexico until returning to New York on 2 June.

On her final mission Ontario departed for New Orleans beginning her last distant station cruise on 22 February 1842, protecting American shipping and other interests, She then set sail for Norfolk and then finally Baltimore on 30 July 1843, where the ship began duty as a Navy Yard receiving ship and remained there in service until June 1856. After her service to the United States the Ontario was sold at public auction on 15 July.

== See also ==
- List of sailing frigates of the United States Navy

== Bibliography ==
- Leiner, Frederic C. (2007). The End of Barbary Terror, America's 1815 War against the Pirates of North Africa. Oxford University Press, 2007. ISBN 978-0-19-532540-9.
- Cooper, James Fenimore (1856). History of the navy of the United States of America.
  Stringer & Townsend, New York. p. 508. OCLC 197401914. Url
- Harris, Gardner W. (1837). The life and services of Commodore William Bainbridge, United States Navy. New York: Carey Lea & Blanchard. p. 254. ISBN 0-945726-58-9. Url1 Url2
- Paullin, Charles Oscar (1910). Commodore John Rodgers: Captain ...
  The Arthur H. Clark Company, Cleveland, Ohio. p. 434. Url
- Roosevelt, Theodore (1883). The naval war of 1812.
  G.P. Putnam's sons, New York. p. 541. Url
- Dept U.S.Navy. "Ontario". Dictionary of American Naval Fighting Ships.
  DEPARTMENT OF THE NAVY – NAVAL HISTORICAL CENTER. Archived from the original on March 29, 2004.
- Dept U.S.Navy. "Ontario, DANFS search results".
  Dept. U.S. Navy Historical Center.

'
