= Second Barbary War =

1815 conflict between Algiers and the US

- Part of the Barbary Wars
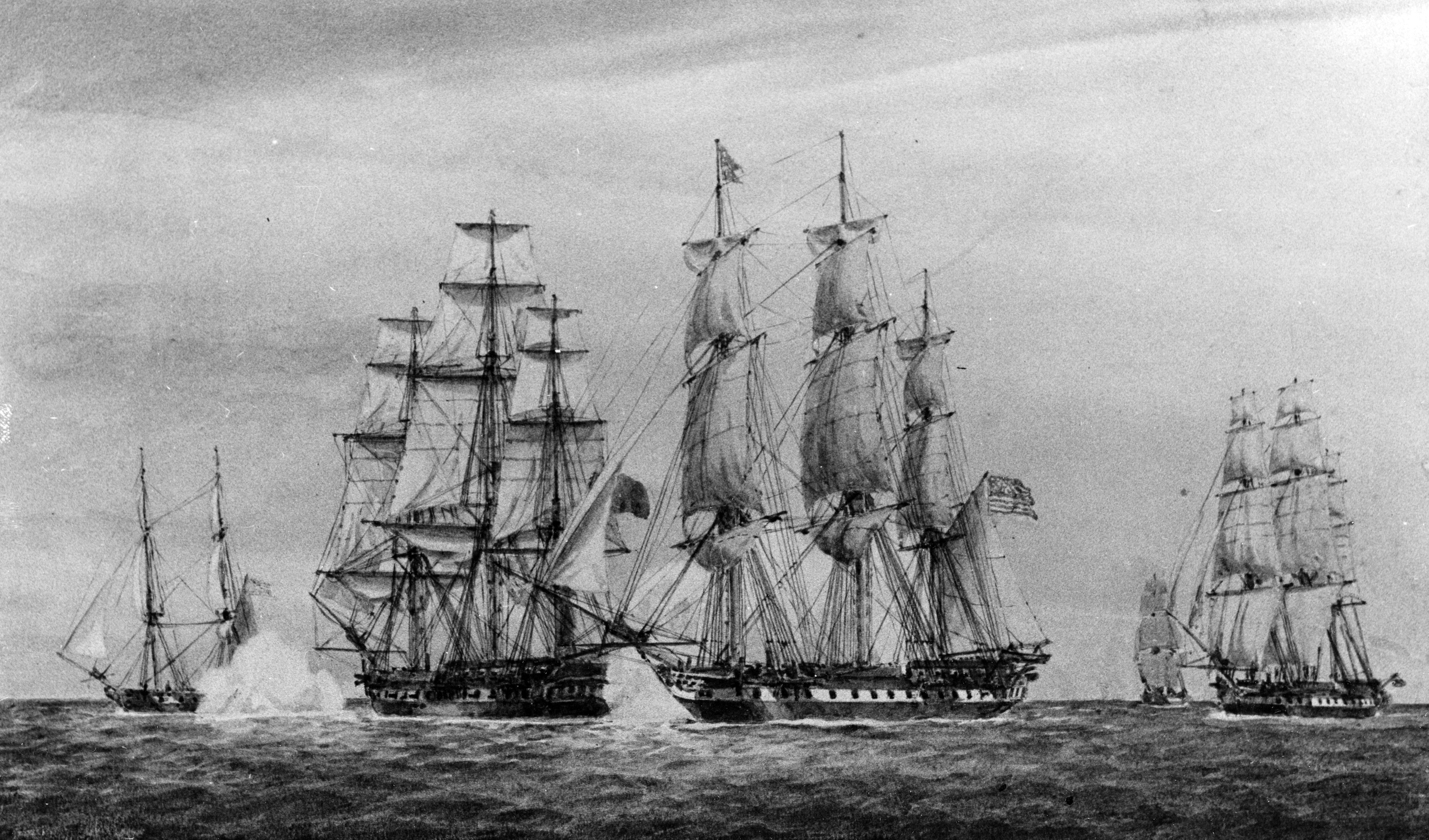
- Commodore Decatur’s Squadron capturing the Algerian pirate ship Mashuda, on 17 June 1815, Irwin Bevan
Date	17–19 June 1815 (2 days)
Location	Mediterranean Sea
Result	American victory

Belligerents
United States	Regency of Algiers

Commanders and leaders
James Madison; Stephen Decatur	Omar Agha; Raïs Hamidou †

Strength
3 frigates 3 brigs 2 schooners 2 sloops	5 frigates 7 smaller warships

Casualties and losses
40 killed and wounded	53 killed Many wounded 486 captured 2 ships captured 1 ship sunk

The Second Barbary War, also known as the U.S.–Algerian War and the Algerine War, was a brief military conflict between the United States and the North African state of Algiers in 1815.

Piracy had been rampant along the North African "Barbary" coast of the Mediterranean Sea since the 16th century. Algerian pirates and privateers intermittently preyed on American ships, with Algiers extracting annual tribute from the U.S. since 1795; the First Barbary War in the early 19th century, fought primarily against Algiers' neighbors, failed to stop the problem.

In February 1815, after the end of the War of 1812, U.S. president James Madison requested that Congress declare war against Algiers; legislation was passed on 3 March 1815 authorizing the use of the U.S. Navy to protect American interests and seize Algerian assets. In May, a 10-ship squadron led by Commodore Stephen Decatur—a veteran of the First Barbary War—sailed from New York to Algiers. An even larger force, led by Commodore William Bainbridge, another Barbary War veteran, was close behind.

Following a decisive U.S. victory off the coast of Cape Gata in June 1815, Commodore Decatur successfully pressed Dey Omar Agha of Algeria to sue for peace. The resulting agreement was formalized in a treaty ratified by the U.S. Senate on 5 December 1815. However, Agha later repudiated the treaty, as well as similar agreements with several European nations, until a combined Anglo-Dutch force bombarded Algiers in 1816; the subsequent arrival of a U.S. squadron carrying U.S. commissioner William Shaler led to a new but substantially similar treaty on 23 December 1816, which was ratified on 11 February 1822.

The Algerian War resulted in the United States and Europe ceasing tribute to Algiers and marked the beginning of the end of piracy in the Mediterranean. It also elevated U.S. military prestige and power since the prior Barbary War. Western nations built ever more sophisticated and expensive ships that the Barbary pirates could not match in numbers or technology, and the French conquest of Algeria in 1830 fully ended any vestige of piracy in the region.

== Background ==
The First Barbary War (1801–1805) had led to an uneasy truce between the US and the Barbary states, but American attention turned to Britain and the War of 1812. The Barbary pirates returned to their practice of attacking American merchant vessels in the Mediterranean Sea and ransoming their crews to the United States government. At the same time, the major European powers were still involved in the Napoleonic Wars, which did not fully end until June 1815 (Battle of Waterloo).

At the conclusion of the War of 1812, the US government under President James Madison returned to the problem of Barbary piracy. On 3 March 1815, the US Congress authorized deployment of naval power against Algiers, and the squadron under the command of Commodore Stephen Decatur set sail on 20 May. It consisted of USS Guerriere (flagship), Constellation, Macedonian, Epervier, Ontario, Firefly, Spark, Flambeau, Torch, and Spitfire.

== War ==
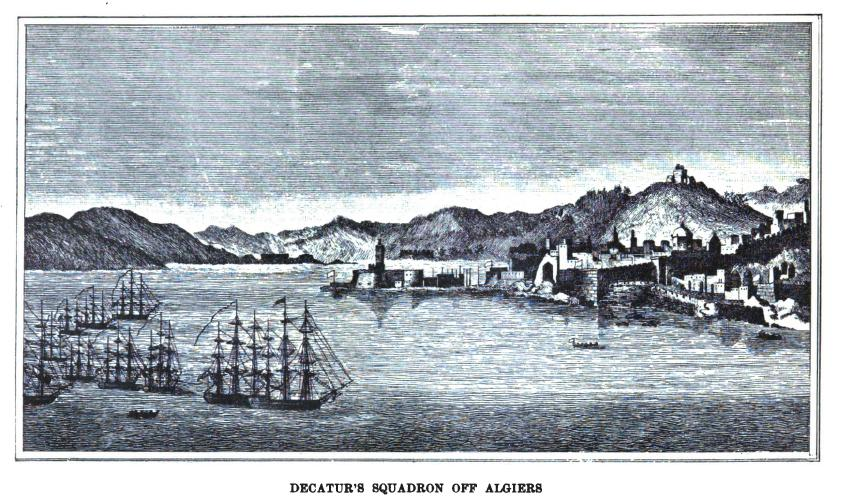
Decatur's squadron off Algiers

During the War of 1812, Algiers had generally aligned with the British (although Britain's Atlantic blockade had limited US trade in the Mediterranean region). President Madison recommended that Congress declare the "existence of a state of war between the United States and the Dey and Regency of Algiers." While Congress did not formally declare a state of war, they did pass legislation, enacted on 3 March 1815, that authorized the president to use the U.S. Navy, "as judged requisite by the President" to protect the "commerce and seamen" of the United States on the "Atlantic Ocean, the Mediterranean and adjoining seas." Congress also authorized the president to grant the U.S. Navy the ability to seize all vessels and goods belonging to Algiers. The legislation also authorized the president to commission privateers for the same purpose.

On 20 May 1815, a 10-ship squadron left New York (to be followed by a larger fleet under command of William Bainbridge). Shortly after departing Gibraltar en route to Algiers, Decatur's squadron encountered the Algerian flagship Meshouda and captured it in the Battle off Cape Gata. They also managed to capture the Algerian brig Estedio in the Battle off Cape Palos. On 29 June, the squadron had reached Algiers and had initiated negotiations with the Bey. The United States made persistent demands for compensation, mingled with threats of destruction, and the Dey capitulated. He signed a treaty aboard the Guerriere in the Bay of Algiers on 3 July 1815, in which Decatur agreed to return the captured Meshuda and Estedio. The Algerians returned all American captives, estimated to be about 10, in exchange for about 500 subjects of the Dey. Algeria also paid $10,000 for seized shipping. The treaty guaranteed no further tributes by the United States and granted the United States full shipping rights in the Mediterranean Sea.

Algiers, Tripoli and Tunis were Ottoman Empire regencies at the time but Ottoman Empire central government did not send any major army or naval fleet to fight the United States.

== Aftermath ==
Despite having successfully negotiated for their freedom, all 10 US captives perished when the ship returning them to the US, Epervier, sank in the Atlantic ocean on 9 August 1815. Although the conflict was brief and small-scale, it showed US resolve and was a victory for free trade.

In early 1816, Britain undertook a diplomatic mission, backed by a small squadron of ships of the line, to Tunis, Tripoli, and Algiers to convince the Deys to stop their piracy and free European Christian slaves. The Deys of Tunis and Tripoli agreed without any resistance, but the Dey of Algiers was less cooperative, and the negotiations were stormy. The leader of the diplomatic mission, Admiral Edward Pellew, believed that he had negotiated a treaty to stop the slavery of Christians and returned to England. However, just after the treaty was signed, Algerian troops massacred 200 Corsican, Sicilian and Sardinian fishermen who had been under British protection thanks to the negotiations. This caused outrage in Britain and the rest of Europe, and Pellew's negotiations were seen as a failure.

As a result, Pellew was ordered to sea again to complete the job and punish the Algerians. He gathered a squadron of five ships of the line, reinforced by a number of frigates, later reinforced by a flotilla of six Dutch ships. On 27 August 1816, following a round of failed negotiations, the fleet delivered a punishing nine-hour bombardment of Algiers. The attack immobilized many of the Dey's corsairs and shore batteries, forcing him to accept a peace offer of the same terms that he had rejected the day before. Pellew warned that if the terms were not accepted, he would continue the action. The Dey accepted the terms, but Pellew had been bluffing since his fleet had already spent all its ammunition.

A treaty was signed on 24 September 1816. The British Consul and 1,083 other Christian slaves were freed, and the U.S. ransom money repaid.

== See also ==
- First Barbary War
- Bombardment of Algiers (1816)
- Military history of the United States
- Barbary treaties
- James Madison, U.S. president at the time

== Sources ==
- Adams, Henry. History of the United States of America During the Administrations of Thomas Jefferson. Originally published 1891; Library of America edition 1986. ISBN 0-940450-34-8
- Lambert, Frank The Barbary Wars: American Independence in the Atlantic World New York: Hill and Wang, 2005
- London, Joshua E.Victory in Tripoli: How America's War with the Barbary Pirates Established the U.S. Navy and Shaped a Nation New Jersey: John Wiley & Sons, Inc., 2005
- Oren, Michael B. Power, Faith, and Fantasy: The United States in the Middle East, 1776 to 2006. New York: W.W. Norton & Co, 2007. ISBN 978-0-393-33030-4
