= HMS Epervier (1812) =

Brig-sloop of the Royal Navy

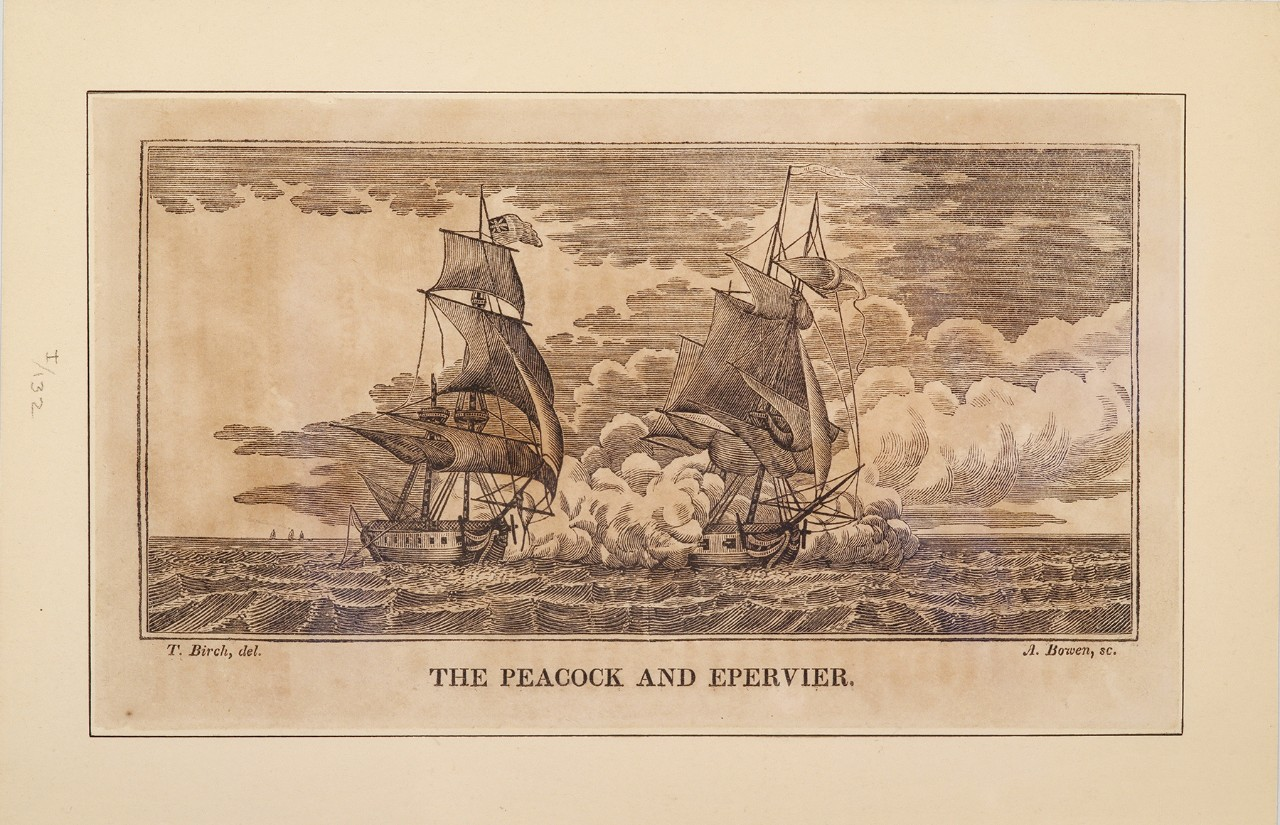
- 1820 engraving by Abel Bowen of a Thomas Birch painting depicting Epervier being captured by USS Peacock

History

United Kingdom
- Name: HMS Epervier
- Ordered: 6 May 1812
- Builder: Mrs. Mary Ross, Rochester, Kent
- Launched: 2 December 1812
- Captured: by U.S. Navy on 29 April 1814

United States
- Name: USS Epervier
- Acquired: Captured by USS Peacock 29 April 1814
- Fate: Disappeared in July or August 1815

General characteristics
- Class & type: Cruizer-class brig-sloop
- Tons burthen: 38968/94 (bm)
- Length: 100 ft 5 in (30.6 m) (overall); 77 ft 8 3/8 in (23.7 m) (keel)
- Beam: 30 ft 8 1/2 in (9.4 m)
- Depth of hold: 12 ft 9 in (3.9 m)
- Propulsion: Sails
- Armament: 2 × 6-pounder bow guns; 16 × 32-pounder carronades

HMS Epervier was an 18-gun Cruizer-class brig-sloop of the Royal Navy, built by Ross at Rochester, England, and launched on 2 December 1812. USS Peacock captured her in 1814 and took her into service. USS Epervier disappeared in 1815 while carrying dispatches reporting the signing of a treaty with the Dey of Algiers.

== War of 1812 ==
Epervier was commissioned in January 1813 under Commander Richard Walter Wales. On 20 August 1813, Epervier captured the schooner Lively, which was sailing from St. Thomas to Halifax, Nova Scotia. Then one month later, on 20 September, she captured Active. Under her master, E. Altberg, Active, of 390 tons (bm), was sailing from Gottenburg to Boston with a cargo of iron. Three days later, Epervier, Majestic and Wasp captured Resolution.

On 5 October Epervier and Fantome captured the American privateer, Portsmouth Packet. She had previously been Liverpool Packet, a noted Nova Scotian privateer, and returned to successful privateering under the Liverpool Packet name after the British recaptured her. At the time of her capture, Portsmouth Packet was armed with five guns, carried a crew of 45, and had sailed from Portsmouth the previous day. Almost a month later, on 3 November, Epervier and Fantome captured Peggy of 91 tons (bm), W. O. Fuller, master, which was sailing from George's River to Boston with a cargo of timber and wood.

On 23 February 1814 Epervier was cruising off Cape Sable, when she captured the American privateer-brig Alfred, of Salem. Alfred, which mounted 16 long 9-pounders and had a crew, variously described, as being of 94 or 108 men, surrendered without a fight. (The British 38-gun frigate Junon, under the command of Captain Clotworthy Upton, was in sight about 10 nautical miles (19 km; 12 mi) to leeward.)

While returning to Halifax with Alfred, Wales found out that some of his crew were plotting with the prisoners from Alfred to take over one or both vessels and escape to the United States. Wales continued on to Halifax, where he arrived two days later, having sailed through a gale to do so. There he notified his uncle, Admiral Sir John Borlase Warren, the commanding officer of the station, that he didn't trust his crew. Warren dismissed Wales' concerns and she sailed on 3 March with the same crew. She and the schooner Shelburne sailed with a small convoy bound to Bermuda and the West Indies. Before she left Halifax, Wales exchanged her two 6-pounder bow chasers and the carronade for her launch for two 18-pounder carronades.

== Capture ==
On 14 April Epervier sailed from Port Royal, Jamaica, calling at Havana, where she took on board $118,000 in specie. She left Havana on 25 April bound for Halifax. The 22-gun sloop-of-war USS Peacock captured Epervier off Cape Canaveral, Florida, on 29 April, during the War of 1812. Epervier's crew consisted mainly of invalids from the hospital, giving her the worst crew of any ship on her station. In the engagement Epervier suffered eight killed and 15 wounded, as well as extensive damage. (Note: One of the officers on board Peacock was Philip Falkerson Voorhees, future captain of USS Congress.)

== US service ==
USS Epervier in distress, 1815

Despite the extensive damage inflicted in this engagement, John B. Nicolson, Peacock's First Lieutenant, was able to sail her to Savannah, Georgia. Following repairs, the US Navy took her into service as USS Epervier.

Epervier, under Master Commandant John Downes, sailed to join the Mediterranean Squadron under Commodore Stephen Decatur, Jr., whose mission was to stop the harassment of American shipping by the Dey of Algiers. Epervier joined with Guerriere, Constellation, and Ontario in the Battle off Cape Gata on 17 June 1815, which led to the capture of the 44 (or 46)-gun frigate Meshuda (or Mashuda). Epervier fired nine broadsides into Meshuda to induce her to surrender, after Guerriere had already crippled the Algerian vessel.

Two days later Epervier and three of the smaller vessels of the squadron captured the Algerine brig of war Estedio, of twenty-two guns and 180 men, at the Battle off Cape Palos. After the conclusion of peace with Algiers, Decatur transferred Downes to Guerriere.

== Loss ==
After the Dey signed a treaty, Decatur chose Epervier, under Lieutenant John T. Shubrick, Guerriere's former first lieutenant, to carry a copy of the treaty and some captured flags to the United States. Captain Lewis, and Lieutenants Neale and John Yarnall, came on board as passengers. Epervier sailed through the Straits of Gibraltar on 14 July 1815 and was never heard from again. She may have encountered a hurricane reported in the Atlantic on 9 August 1815. In all, she was carrying 132 sailors and 2 marines.

== See also ==
- List of people who disappeared mysteriously at sea
