= Dennis Malone Carter =

Irish-American painter

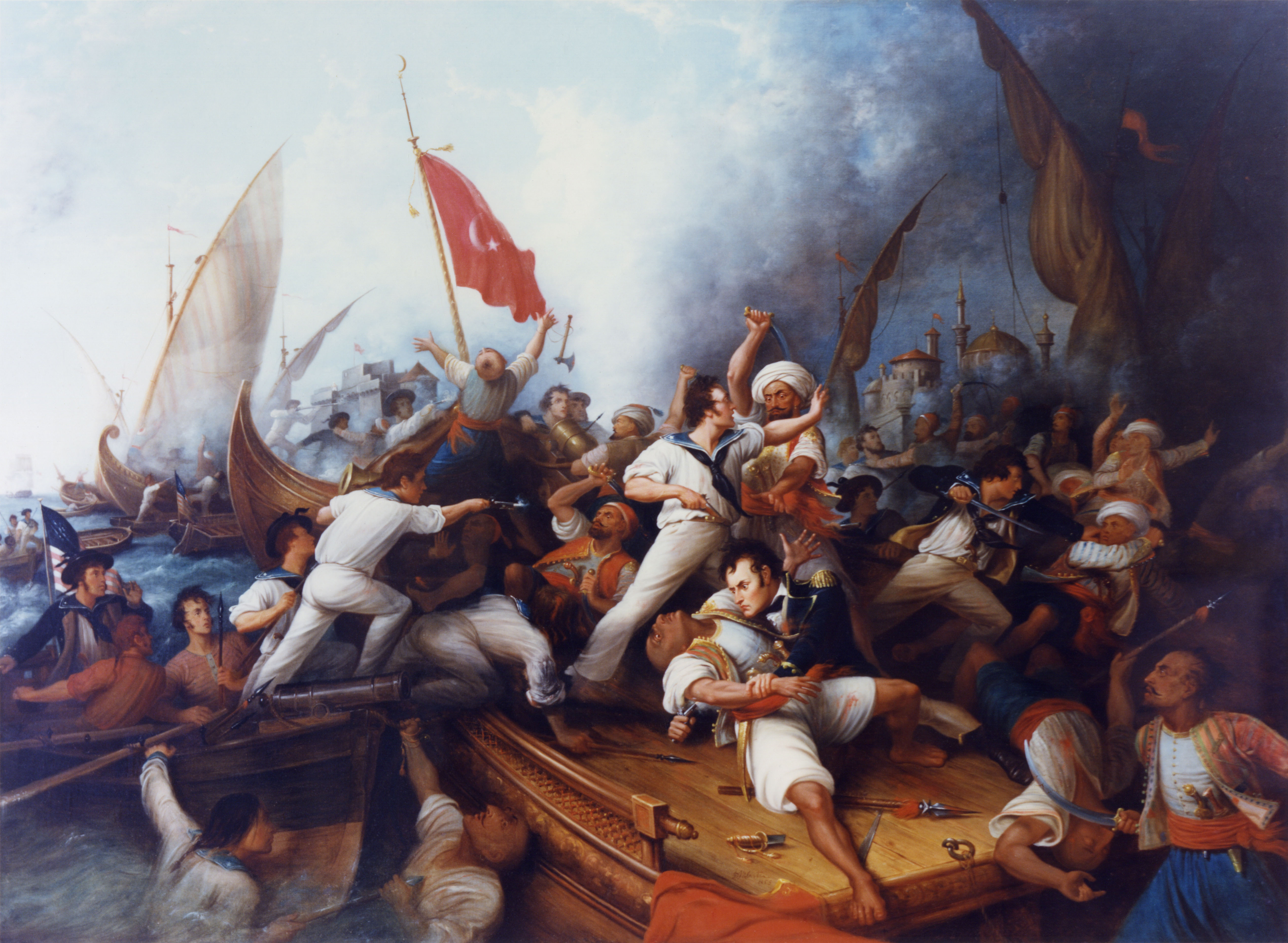
- Decatur Boarding the Tripolitan Gunboat by Dennis Malone Carter
- Born: c. 1820; Ireland
- Died: July 6, 1881; New York City
- Known for: Painting
- Notable work: Decatur Boarding the Tripolitan Gunboat

Dennis Malone Carter (c. 1820 - 1881) was an Irish-American painter. Carter's birth date is variously listed as 1818, 1820, and 1827. Born in Ireland, he immigrated to the United States with his parents in 1839. He settled in New York City, painting portraits and historical settings, where he died in July 1881. He is interred in Woodlawn Cemetery in The Bronx, New York City.

== Artworks ==
Year	Title	Image	Dimension	Collection	Comments
1852	Intrusion on the Realm of the Forest, oil on canvas		39 × 49½ in. (99 × 125.73 cm.)	The collection of William B. Ruger	Subject: A group of Native Americans at the base of a wooded hill.
1854	Molly Pitcher at the Battle of Monmouth, oil			Fraunces Tavern Museum, New York	Subject: Molly Pitcher loading a cannon at the Battle of Monmouth during the American Revolutionary War, 1778.
1856	Molly Pitcher Being Presented to George Washington, oil			Monmouth County Historical Association, Freehold, New Jersey	Subject: Molly Pitcher presented to George Washington in commendation for her actions at the Battle of Monmouth.
1856	The Battle of New Orleans		19 × 25 1/16 in. (48.26 × 63.66 cm.)	The Historic New Orleans Collection, The L. Kemper and Leila Moore Williams Founders Collection	Subject: Andrew Jackson leading the American defense against the British at the Battle of New Orleans, January 8, 1815.
1866	Lincoln's Drive Through Richmond			Chicago History Museum	Subject: A crowd, mostly white, saluting Abraham Lincoln's carriage as it passes through Richmond, Virginia
1878	Decatur Boarding the Tripolitan Gunboat, oil		43 × 59 in. (109.2 × 149.9 cm.)	National Museum of the United States Navy, Naval Historical Foundation, Washington Navy Yard, Washington, D.C.	Subjects: Lieutenant Stephen Decatur, Jr. (1779–1820); Midshipman Thomas Macdonough, Jr. (1783-1825). Scene: during the bombardment of Tripoli (in modern-day Libya), 3 August 1804 (during First Barbary War); US forces under command of Commodore Edward Preble (1761-1807).
1854	Farewell to the old home, oil		36 x 50in (91.44 x 127cm.)		Subject: A young family outside a house in the forest, including a dog.
