= Sinepuxent, Maryland =

Coordinates: 38°18′47″N 75°09′07″W

Sinepuxent or Sinepuxent Town was a village in Worcester County, Maryland, located on Sinepuxent Neck across Sinepuxent Bay from the barrier island of Assateague. The village was destroyed by a hurricane in 1818 and never rebuilt. Its location arose in large part from its convenience to ocean-going ships: an inlet—Sinepuxent Inlet—allowed access through Assateague Island from the Atlantic Ocean to Sinepuxent Bay, until it was closed by the same hurricane that destroyed the village.

Sinepuxent was the birthplace of U.S. Navy officer Stephen Decatur in 1779.
