= Stephen Decatur =

United States naval officer and commodore (1779–1820)

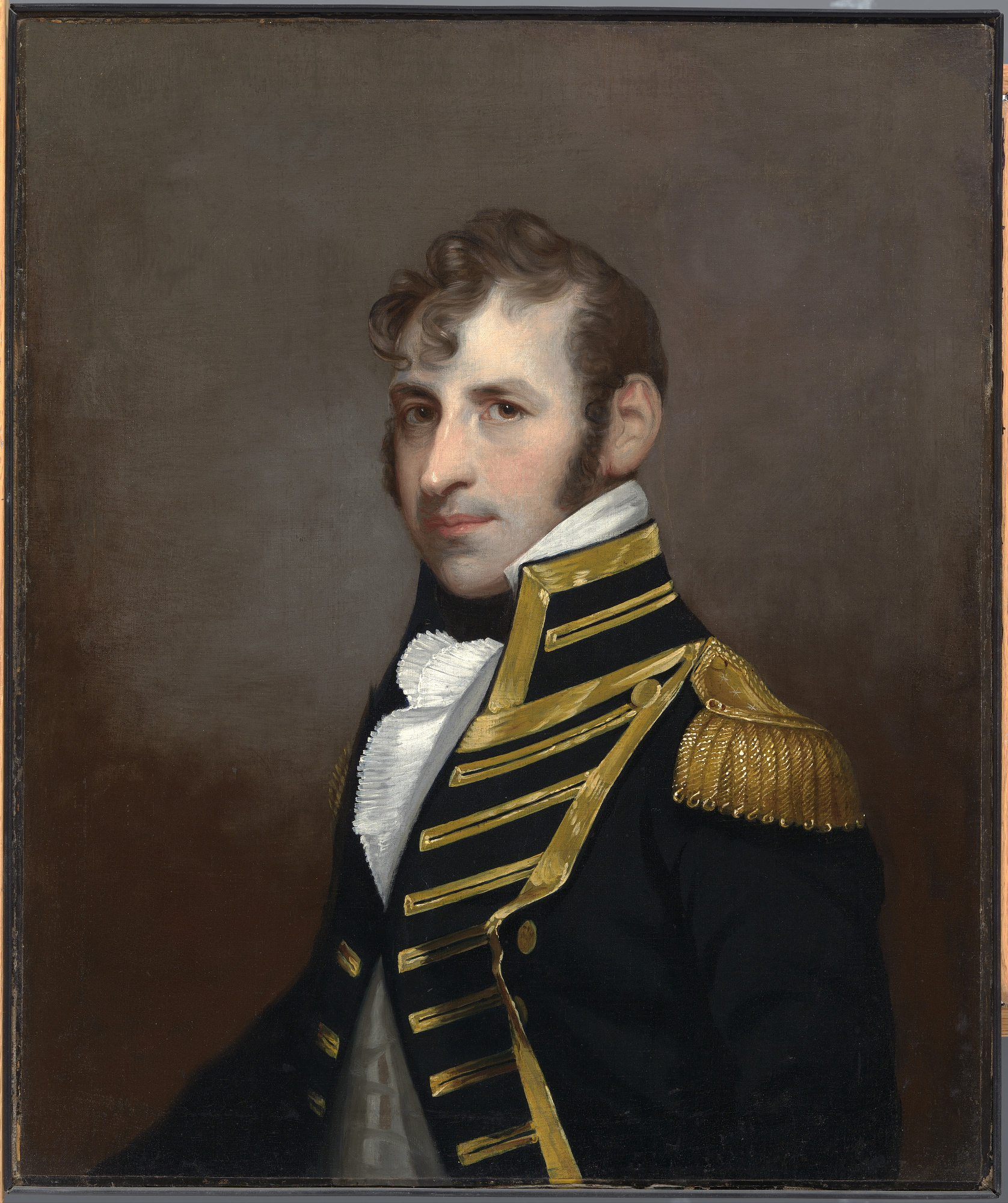
- Portrait by Charles Bird King
- Born: Stephen Decatur Jr. January 5, 1779; Sinepuxent, Maryland
- Died: March 22, 1820 (aged 41); Washington, D.C., U.S.
- Burial place: St. Peter's Episcopal Church, Philadelphia, Pennsylvania, U.S.
- Spouse: Susan Wheeler (m. 1806)
- Military career
- Branch: United States Navy
- Service years: 1798–1820
- Rank: Commodore
- Commands: USS Argus (1803); USS Enterprise (1799); USS Chesapeake (1799); USS United States (1797); USS President (1800); USS Constitution (1797); USS Guerriere (1814)
- Conflicts: Quasi-War; First Barbary War; Second Battle of Tripoli Harbor; War of 1812; USS United States vs HMS Macedonian; Second Barbary War; Battle off Cape Gata; Battle of Cape Palos (1815)
- Awards: Congressional Gold Medal
- Other work: Board of Navy Commissioners

Stephen Decatur Jr. (/dɪˈkeɪtər/; January 5, 1779 – March 22, 1820) was a United States Navy officer. He was born on the eastern shore of Maryland in Worcester County. His father, Stephen Decatur Sr., was a commodore in the Continental Navy during the American Revolutionary War; he brought the younger Stephen into the world of ships and sailing early on. Shortly after attending college, Decatur followed in his father's footsteps and joined the U.S. Navy at age 19 as a midshipman.

Decatur supervised the construction of several U.S. naval vessels, one of which he later commanded. Promoted at age 25, he is the youngest man to reach the rank of captain in the history of the United States Navy. He served under three presidents and played a major role in the early development of the U.S. Navy. In almost every theater of operation, Decatur's service was characterized by acts of heroism and exceptional performance. His service in the U.S. Navy took him through both Barbary Wars in North Africa, the Quasi-War with France, and the War of 1812 with Britain. He was renowned for his natural ability to lead and for his genuine concern for the seamen under his command. Decatur's naval victories in all three conflicts helped to establish the United States Navy as a rising power.

During this period he served aboard and commanded many naval vessels and ultimately became a member of the Board of Navy Commissioners. He built, in 1818, a large home in Washington known as Decatur House on Lafayette Square, and was at the center of Washington society in the early 19th century. He became an affluent member of Washington society and counted James Monroe and other Washington dignitaries among his personal friends.

In 1820, Decatur's career came to an early end when he was killed in a duel with Commodore James Barron after he refused to retract remarks he had made about Barron's conduct in the Chesapeake–Leopard affair in 1807. Decatur had emerged as a national hero in his own lifetime, becoming the first post–Revolutionary War hero. His name and legacy, like that of John Paul Jones, became identified with the United States Navy.

== Early life and education ==
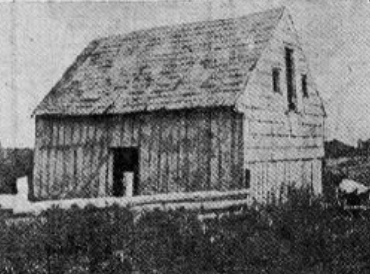
Decatur's birthplace in Maryland

Decatur was born on January 5, 1779, in Sinepuxent, Maryland, (Note: Town was destroyed by a hurricane in 1818, rebuilt years later and named 'Berlin'.) to Stephen Decatur Sr., a merchant captain and later an officer in the young American navy during the American Revolution, and his wife Ann (Pine) Decatur. The family of Decatur was of French descent on Stephen's father's side, while his mother's family was of English and Irish ancestry. His parents had arrived from Philadelphia just three months before Stephen was born, fleeing the city during the American Revolutionary War due to its occupation by British forces. They later returned to the same residence they had once left in Philadelphia and Decatur grew up there, eventually graduating from the Episcopal Academy.

Decatur came to love the sea and sailing in a roundabout manner. When Stephen was eight years old, he developed a severe case of whooping cough. In those days, a supposed tonic for this condition was exposure to the salt air of the sea. It was decided that Stephen Jr. would accompany his father aboard a merchant ship on his next voyage to Europe. Sailing across the Atlantic and back proved to be an effective remedy, and Decatur came home completely recovered. In the days following young Stephen's return, he was jubilant about his adventure on the high sea and spoke of wanting to go sailing often. His parents had different aspirations, especially his mother who had hopes that Stephen would one day become an Episcopal clergyman, and tried to discourage the eight-year-old from such jaunty ambitions, fearing such would distract Stephen from his studies.

Decatur attended Woodbury Academy in Woodbury, New Jersey. At the direction of his father, Decatur attended the Episcopal Academy, at the time an all-boys school that specialized in Latin, mathematics, and religion; however, Decatur had not applied himself adequately, and barely graduated from the academy. He then enrolled for one year at the University of Pennsylvania in 1795, where he better applied himself and focused on his studies. At the university, Decatur met and became friends with Charles Stewart and Richard Somers, who would later become naval officers themselves.

Decatur found the classic studies prosaic and life at the university disagreeable, and at the age of 17, with his heart and mind set on ships and the sea, discontinued his studies there. Though his parents were not pleased with his decision, they continued to be supportive of him. Through his father's influence, Stephen gained employment at the shipbuilding firm of Gurney and Smith, business associates of his father, acting as supervisor to the early construction of the frigate United States. He was serving on board this vessel as a midshipman when it was launched on May 10, 1797, under the command of Commodore John Barry.

== Pre-commission ==
In the years leading up to the Quasi-War, an undeclared naval war with the revolutionary French Republic involving disputes over U.S. trading and shipping with Britain, the U.S. Congress passed the 'Act to provide for a Naval Armament' on March 27, 1794. The act provided for the commissioning of six frigates for the Navy. It was promptly signed by George Washington that same day. There was much opposition to the bill, and it was amended and allowed to pass with the condition that work on the proposed ships would stop in the event that peace with the Pasha of Algiers was obtained. Construction of the six new American frigates was progressing slowly when, because of a peace accord with Algiers in March 1796, work was halted. After some debate and at the insistence of President Washington, Congress passed an act on April 20, 1796, allowing the construction and funding to continue, but only on the three ships nearest to completion at the time: USS United States, USS Constellation and USS Constitution.

In 1798, John Barry obtained Decatur's appointment as a midshipman aboard United States, under Barry's command. Barry was a veteran and hero of the Revolutionary War and was Decatur's good friend and mentor. Decatur accepted the appointment on May 1. During his early naval career Decatur learned the arts of naval war under Barry, and also James Barron, both of whom took a liking to Decatur.

To ensure his son's success in his naval career, the senior Decatur hired a tutor, Talbot Hamilton, a former officer of the Royal Navy, to instruct his son in navigational and nautical sciences. While serving aboard United States Decatur received what was the equivalent to formal naval training not only from Hamilton but through active service aboard a commissioned ship, which is something that distinguished the young midshipman from many of his contemporaries. He also had a talent for drawing ships and designing and building ship models and when time allowed would also pursue this hobby.

== Quasi-War ==
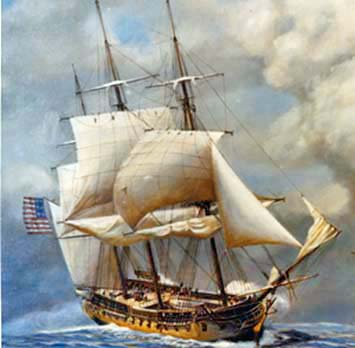
USS Constellation, the first U.S. Navy vessel put to sea

Once the United States won its independence and no longer had the protection of Britain, it was faced with the task of protecting its own ships and interests. There were few American ships capable of defending the American coastline, much less of protecting merchant ships at sea and abroad. The few warships that were available were converted into merchant ships. The French in particular were outraged that America was still involved in trading with Britain, a country with whom they were at war, and because of American refusal to pay a debt that was owed to the French crown, which had just been overthrown by the newly established French Republic. As a result, France began intercepting American ships that were involved in trading with Britain. This provocation prompted President Adams to appoint Benjamin Stoddert as the first Secretary of the Navy. Stoddert immediately ordered his senior commanders to "subdue, seize and take any armed vessel or vessels sailing under the authority or pretense of authority, from the French Republic." At this time, America was not even ranked with European naval forces.

On May 22, 1799, Decatur was promoted to lieutenant by President John Adams after serving for more than a year as a midshipman aboard the frigate United States. While United States was undergoing repairs Decatur received orders to remain in Philadelphia to recruit and assemble a crew for the vessel. While there, the chief mate of an Indiaman, using foul language, made several derogatory remarks about Decatur and the U.S. Navy, apparently because he had lost some of his crew to Decatur's recruiting efforts. Decatur remained calm and left the scene without further incident. When he related the matter to his father, however, Captain Decatur stressed that the honor of the family and of the Navy had been insulted and that his son should return and challenge the chief mate to a duel. Stephen's friend and shipmate, Lieutenant Somers, was sent ahead with a letter from Decatur asking if an apology could be obtained from the man. Refusing to apologize, the chief mate instead accepted Decatur's challenge and secured a location for the duel. Decatur, being an expert shot with a pistol, told his friend Lieutenant Charles Stewart that he believed his opponent not to be as able and he would thus endeavor to only wound his opponent in the hip, which is exactly how the duel turned out. The honor and courage of both duelists having been satisfied, the matter was resolved without a fatality.

By July 1, 1799, United States had been refitted and repaired and commenced its mission to patrol the South Atlantic coast and West Indies in search of French ships which were preying on American merchant vessels. After completing this mission the ship was taken to Norfolk, Virginia, for minor repairs, and then set sail for Newport, Rhode Island, arriving on September 12. While the ship was berthed there, Commodore Barry received orders to prepare for a voyage to transport two U.S. envoys to Spain and on December 3 sailed on United States for Lisbon via England. During the crossing the ship encountered gale force winds, and at their insistence, the two envoys were dropped off at the nearest port in England. Upon returning home and arriving on the Delaware River on April 3, 1800, it was discovered that United States had incurred damage from the storms she had weathered at sea. Consequently, the vessel was taken up the Delaware to Chester, Pennsylvania, for repairs. Not wanting to remain with United States during the months of repairs and outfitting, Decatur obtained a transfer to the brig USS Norfolk under the command of Thomas Calvert. In May the Norfolk sailed to the West Indies to patrol its waters looking for French privateers and men-of-war. During the months that followed 25 armed enemy craft were captured or destroyed. With orders to rendezvous with merchantmen bound for America, Norfolk continued on to Cartagena (Colombia) with orders to escort the ships back to the United States, protecting them from pirates and privateers.

Decatur transferred back to United States by June 1800; with extra guns and sails and improved structure, the refurbished ship made her way down the Delaware River. Aboard the ship at this time were Decatur's former classmates Lieutenant Charles Stewart and Midshipman Richard Somers, along with Lieutenant James Barron.

Following the Quasi-War, the U.S. Navy underwent a significant reduction of active ships and officers; Decatur was one of the few selected to remain commissioned. By the time hostilities with France came to a close, America had a renewed appreciation for the value of a navy. By 1801 the American Navy consisted of 42 naval vessels, three of which were USS President, Constellation and USS Chesapeake.

== First Barbary War ==
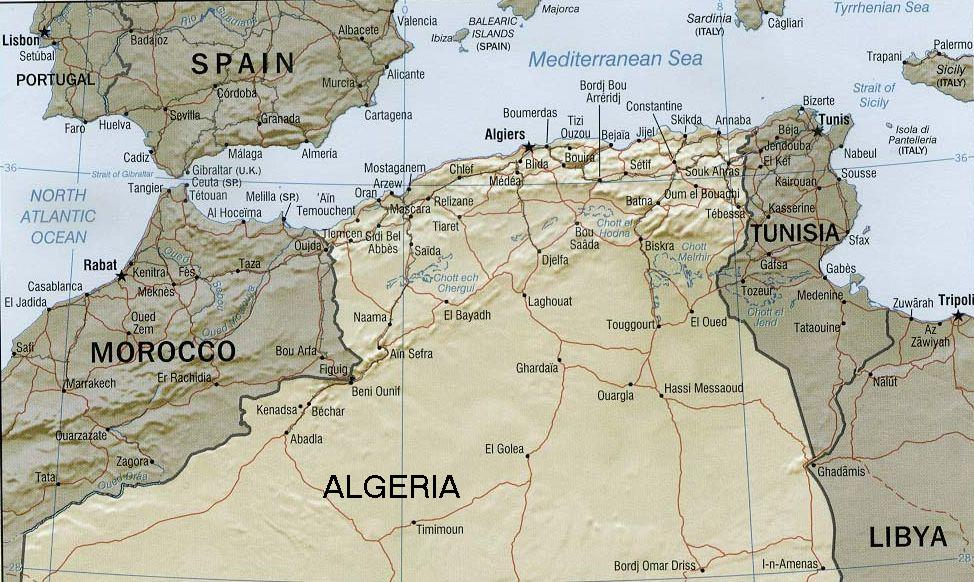
Barbary Coast of North Africa

The first war against the Barbary States was in response to the frequent piracy of American vessels in the Mediterranean Sea and the capture and enslavement of American crews for huge ransoms. President Jefferson, known for his aversion to standing armies and the navy, acted contrary to such sentiment and began his presidency by sending U.S. naval forces to fight the Barbary states rather than continue paying huge annual tributes to the petty North African kingdoms. On May 13, 1801, at the beginning of the war, Decatur was assigned duty aboard the frigate USS Essex to serve as the first lieutenant. Essex, bearing 32 guns, was commanded by William Bainbridge and was attached to Commodore Richard Dale's squadron which also included USS Philadelphia, President and USS Enterprise. Departing for the Mediterranean on June 1, this squadron was the first American naval squadron to cross the Atlantic.

On July 1, after encountering and being forestalled by adverse winds, the squadron sailed into the Mediterranean with the mission to confront the Barbary pirates. Arriving at Gibraltar, Commodore Dale learned that Tripoli had already declared war upon the United States. At this time there were two Tripolitan warships of sizable consequence berthed in Gibraltar's harbour, but their captains claimed that they had no knowledge of the war. Dale assumed they were about to embark on the Atlantic to prey on American merchant ships. With orders to sail for Algiers, Tunis and Tripoli, Dale ordered that Philadelphia be left behind to guard the Tripolitan vessels.

In September 1802, Decatur transferred to the 36-gun frigate USS New York as 1st Lieutenant under Commodore James Barron. While en route to Tripoli the five-ship squadron to which New York was attached encountered gale-force winds, lasting more than a week, which forced the squadron to put up in Malta. While there Decatur and another American officer were involved in a personal confrontation with a British officer which resulted in Decatur returning to the United States. There he took temporary command of the newly built 18-gun brig USS Argus which he sailed to Gibraltar, relinquishing command of the ship upon arrival to Lieutenant Isaac Hull. In exchange Decatur was given command of Enterprise, a 12-gun schooner.

On December 23, 1803, Enterprise and USS Constitution confronted the Tripolitan ketch Mastico sailing under Turkish colors, armed with only two guns and sailing without passports on her way to Constantinople from Tripoli. On board were a small number of Tripolitan soldiers. After a brief engagement Decatur and his crew captured the ship, killing or wounding the few men defending the vessel. After its capture the small ship was taken to Syracuse, condemned by Commodore Preble as a legitimate prize of war, and given a new name, USS Intrepid.

=== Burning of USS Philadelphia ===
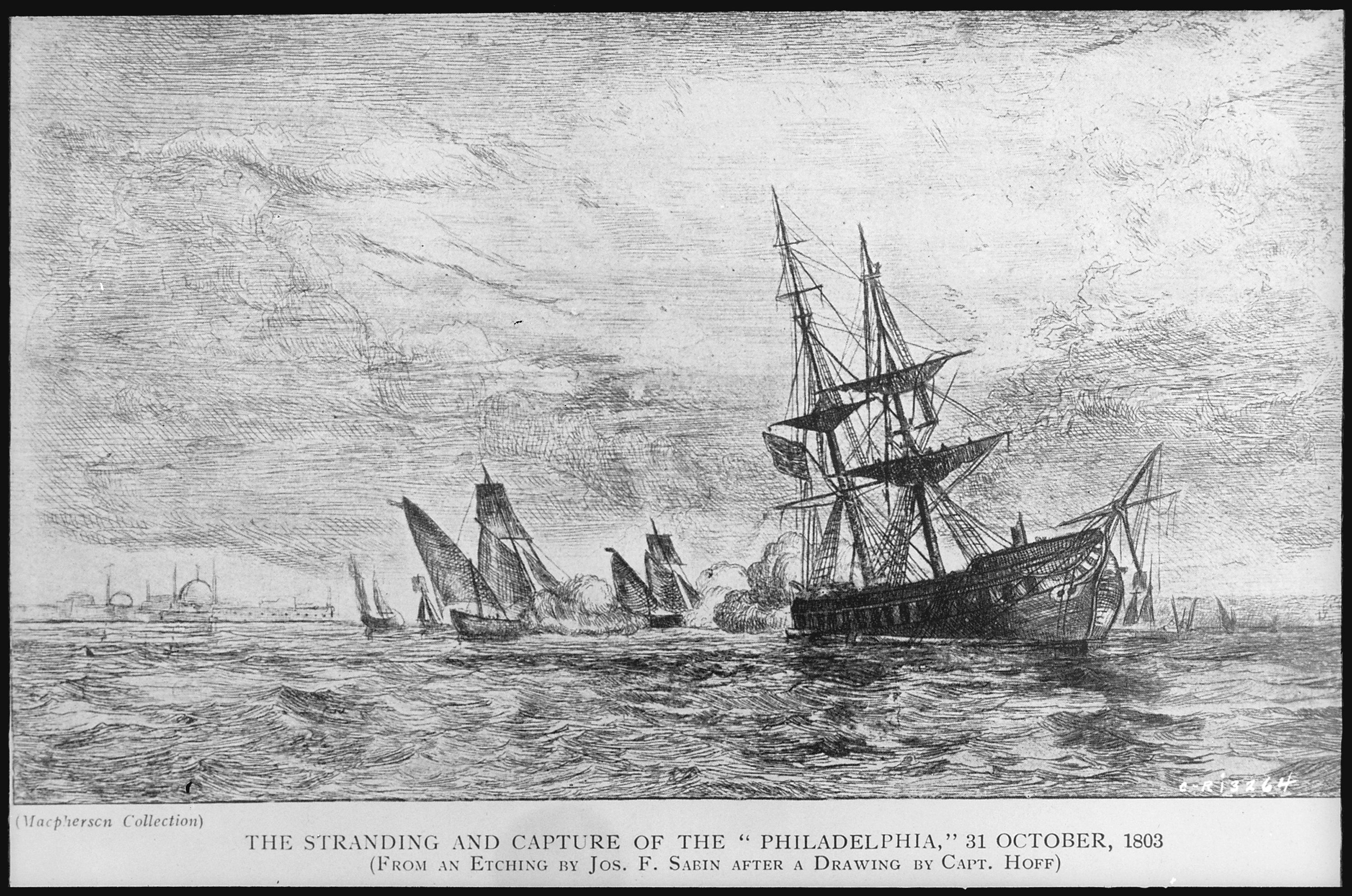
Grounding and capture of USS Philadelphia

On October 31, 1803, Philadelphia, under the command of Commodore William Bainbridge, ran aground on an uncharted reef (known as Kaliusa reef) near Tripoli's harbor. After desperate and failed attempts to refloat the ship, she was subsequently captured and her crew imprisoned by Tripolitan forces. After coming up with an elaborate plan, Decatur sailed for Tripoli with 80 volunteers (most of them being U.S. Marines) intending to enter the harbor with Intrepid without suspicion to board and set ablaze the frigate Philadelphia, denying its use to the corsairs. USS Syren, (Note: Some sources spell the name as Siren.) commanded by Lieutenant Charles Stewart, accompanied Intrepid to provide supporting fire during and after the assault. Before entering the harbor eight sailors from Syren boarded Intrepid, including Thomas Macdonough, who had recently served aboard Philadelphia and knew the ship's layout intimately. Decatur established a close friendship with Macdonough and became his mentor during the course of their careers.

On February 16, 1804, at seven o'clock in the evening under the dim light of a waxing crescent moon, Intrepid slowly sailed into Tripoli harbor. Decatur's vessel was made to look like a common merchant ship from Malta and was outfitted with British colours. To further avert suspicion, on board were five Sicilian volunteers including the pilot Salvatore Catalano, who spoke Arabic. The boarding party remained hidden below in position, prepared to board the captured Philadelphia. The men were divided into several groups, each assigned to secure given areas of the ship, with the additional explicit instruction of refraining from the use of firearms unless it proved absolutely necessary. As Decatur's ship came closer to Philadelphia, Catalano called out to the harbor personnel in Arabic that their ship had lost her anchors during a recent storm and was seeking refuge at Tripoli for repairs. By 9:30 p.m. Decatur's ship was within 200 yards of Philadelphia, whose lower yards were now resting on the deck with her foremast missing, as Bainbridge had ordered it cut away and had also jettisoned some of her guns in a futile effort to refloat the ship by lightening her load.

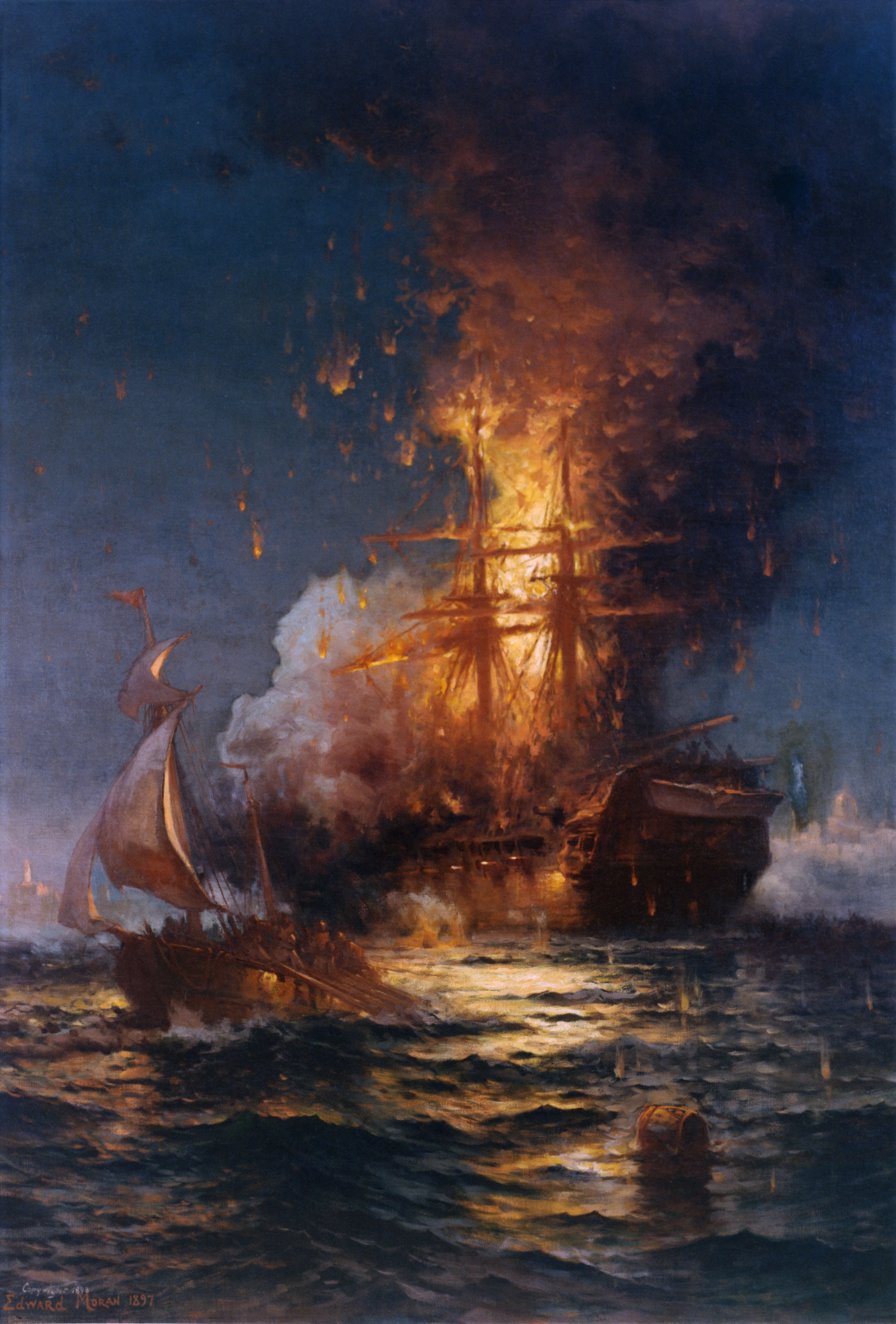
Burning of the USS Philadelphia by Edward Moran (1897), Intrepid depicted in foreground

As Decatur approached the berthed Philadelphia he encountered a light wind that made his approach tedious. He had to casually position his ship close enough to Philadelphia to allow his men to board while not creating any suspicion. When the two vessels were finally close enough, Catalano obtained permission for Decatur to tie Intrepid to the captured Philadelphia. Decatur surprised the few Tripolitans on board when he shouted the order "board!", signaling to the hidden crew below to emerge and storm the captured ship. Without losing a single man, Decatur and 60 of his men, dressed as Maltese sailors or Arab seamen and armed with swords and boarding pikes, boarded and reclaimed Philadelphia in less than 10 minutes, killing at least 20 of the Tripolitan crew, capturing one wounded crewman, and forcing the rest to flee by jumping overboard. Only one of Decatur's men was slightly wounded by a sabre blade. There was hope that the small boarding crew could launch the captured ship, but the vessel was in no condition to set sail for the open sea. Decatur soon realized that the small Intrepid could not tow the larger and heavier warship out of the harbor. Commodore Preble's order to Decatur was to destroy Philadelphia where she berthed as a last resort, if she was unseaworthy. With the ship secure, Decatur's crew began placing combustibles about Philadelphia with orders to set her ablaze. After making sure the fire was large enough to sustain itself, Decatur ordered his men to abandon the ship and was the last man to leave. As the flames intensified, the guns aboard Philadelphia, all loaded and ready for battle, became heated and began discharging, some firing into the town and shore batteries, while the ropes securing the ship burned off, allowing the vessel to drift into the rocks at the western entrance of the harbor.

While Intrepid was under fire from the Tripolitans who were now gathering along the shore and in small boats, the larger Syren was nearby providing covering fire at the Tripolitan shore batteries and gunboats. Decatur and his men left the burning vessel in Tripoli's harbor and set sail for the open sea, barely escaping in the confusion. With the cover of night helping to obscure the enemy gunfire, Intrepid and Syren made their way back to Syracuse, arriving February 18. After learning of Decatur's detachment's daring capture and destruction of Philadelphia without suffering a single fatality, British Vice Admiral Lord Horatio Nelson, who at the time was blockading the French port at Toulon, is said to have stated it was "the most bold and daring act of the Age." Decatur's exploit made him an immediate national hero in the US. Appreciation for the efforts of Preble and Decatur was not limited to their peers and countrymen. At Naples, Decatur was praised and dubbed "Terror of the Foe" by the local media. Upon hearing the news of their victory in Tripoli, Pope Pius VII publicly declared that "the United States, though in their infancy, had done more to humble and humiliate the anti-Christian barbarians on the African coast in one night than all the European states had done for a long period of time." Upon his return to Syracuse, Decatur resumed command of Enterprise.

=== Second attack on Tripoli ===
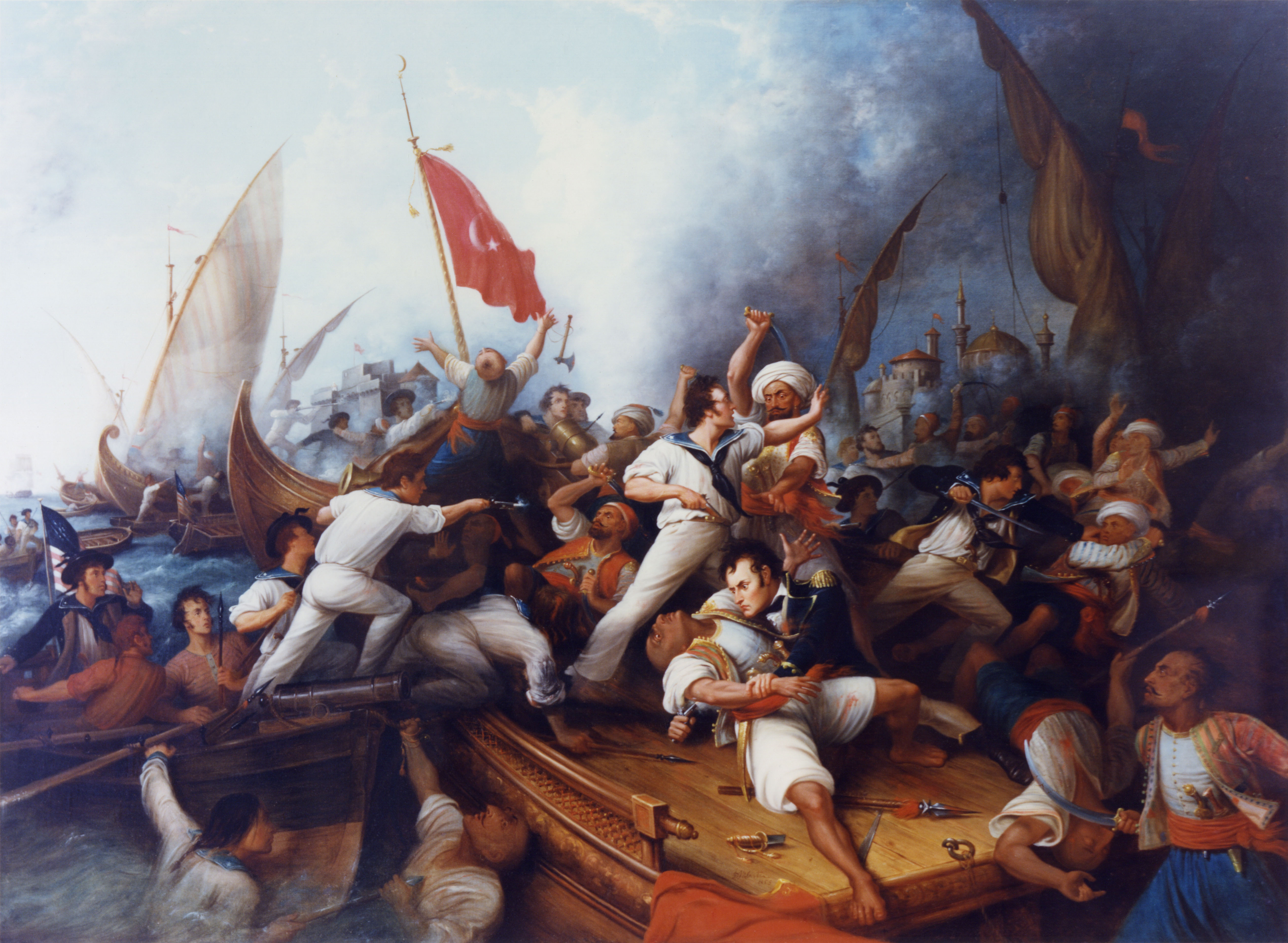
Decatur Boarding the Tripolitan Gunboat, by Dennis Malone Carter

With the significant victory achieved with the burning of Philadelphia, Preble now had reason to believe that bringing Tripoli to peaceful terms was in sight. Preble planned another attack on Tripoli and amassed a squadron consisting of the frigate Constitution, the brigs Syren, Argus and Scourge, and the schooners Nautilus, Vixen and Enterprise, towing gunboats and ketches.

For the coming attack Preble borrowed six gunboats from King Ferdinand I of the Two Sicilies who was also at war with Tripoli. Light vessels with shallow drafts were needed to make their way about in the shallow and confined waters of Tripoli's harbor. (Note: Whipple, 2001 claims only two gunboats were offered.) Making their way into the west end of Tripoli harbor, they began bombarding Tripoli on August 3, 1804.

Preble divided his gunboats into two divisions, putting Decatur in command of the second division. At 1:30 Preble raised his signal flag to begin the attack on Tripoli. It was elaborate and well planned with brigs, schooners and bomb ketches coming into the attack at various stages. The Tripolitan pasha, Murad Reis, was expecting the attack and had his own gunboats lined up and waiting at various locations within the harbor.

Throughout the month of August 1804 Preble used these gunboats to launch a series of furious attacks on Tripoli, forcing the residents to flee into the countryside. During this time, Decatur in command of the gunboats captured three Tripolitan gunboats and sank three others. The Tripolitans also inflicted considerable damage on some of the attacking vessels; Decatur's ship was struck with a 24-pound shot through her hull above the waterline. Before the battle ended USS John Adams, commanded by Isaac Chauncey, arrived on the scene. On board the vessel were official documents promoting Decatur to the rank of captain. John Adams also brought news that, upon the loss of the frigate Philadelphia, the government was sending four additional frigates, President, Congress, Constellation and Essex, to Tripoli with enough force to convince the Pasha of Tripoli that peace was his only viable alternative. Because Preble's rank was not high enough for this command John Adams also brought the news that he would have to surrender command to Barron.

The fighting between the squadrons and the bombarding of Tripoli lasted three hours, with Preble's squadrons emerging victorious. However, success and promotion were overshadowed by an unfortunate turn of events for Decatur. During the fighting Decatur's younger brother, James Decatur, in command of a gunboat, was mortally wounded by a Tripolitan captain during the boarding of a vessel feigning surrender. Midshipman Brown, who was next in command after James, managed to break away from the ambushing vessel and immediately approached Decatur's gunboat bringing the news of his brother's fatal injury. Decatur had just captured his first Tripolitan vessel and upon receiving the news turned command of his captured prize over to Lieutenant Jonathan Thorn and immediately set out to avenge his brother's treacherous injury. After catching up with and pulling alongside the Tripolitan ship, Decatur was the first to board the enemy vessel with Midshipman Macdonough at his heels along with nine volunteer crew members. Decatur and his crew were outnumbered 5 to 1 but were organized and kept their form, fighting furiously side by side. Decatur had little trouble singling out the corsair captain, the man responsible for James' mortal wound, and immediately engaged the man. He was a large and formidable man in Muslim garb, and armed with a boarding pike he thrust his weapon at Decatur's chest. Armed with a cutlass Decatur deflected the lunge, breaking his own weapon at the hilt. During the fight Decatur was almost killed by another Tripolitan crew member, but his life was spared by the already wounded Daniel Frazier, (Note: Some sources claim the man could have been Ruben James.) a crewman who threw himself over Decatur just in time, receiving a blow intended for Decatur to his own head; Frazier's act of heroism later got wrongly attributed to Reuben James. The struggle continued, with the Tripolitan captain, being larger and stronger than Decatur, gaining the upper hand. Armed with a dagger the Tripolitan attempted to stab Decatur in the heart, but while wrestling the arm of his adversary, Decatur managed to take hold of his pistol and fired a shot point-blank, immediately killing his formidable foe. When the fighting was over, 21 Tripolitans were dead with only three taken alive.

Later James Decatur was taken aboard Constitution where he was joined by his brother Stephen, who stayed with him until he had died. The next day, after a funeral and military ceremony that was conducted by Preble, Stephen Decatur saw his brother's remains committed to the depths of the Mediterranean.

When a good number of days passed without the reinforcements of ships promised by President Jefferson, the attack on Tripoli was renewed by Preble on August 24. As the days passed, Tripoli showed no signs of surrender, which now prompted Preble to devise another plan. Intrepid, the same ship that captured Philadelphia, was loaded with barrels of gunpowder and other ordnance and sent sailing into a group of Tripolitan vessels defending the harbor, commanded by Lieutenant Richard Somers, with Midshipman Henry Wadsworth and eleven volunteers. The plan was to place the ketch amidst the Tripolitan ships, light the fuzes, and evacuate to ships awaiting their return at the harbor entrance, but somehow the plan went awry, exploding prior to arriving at its target, killing all aboard. The siege of the harbor and Tripoli, with the momentous capture of the fortress of Derna by US Marines ("the shores of Tripoli") proved successful and ultimately caused the Bashaw of Tripoli to consider surrender and the return of American prisoners held captive, including Commodore Bainbridge of Philadelphia, who had been held prisoner since October 1803 when that ship was captured after running aground near Tripoli harbor. On June 4, 1805, the Bashaw of Tripoli finally surrendered and signed a peace treaty with the United States.

=== Command of USS Constitution ===
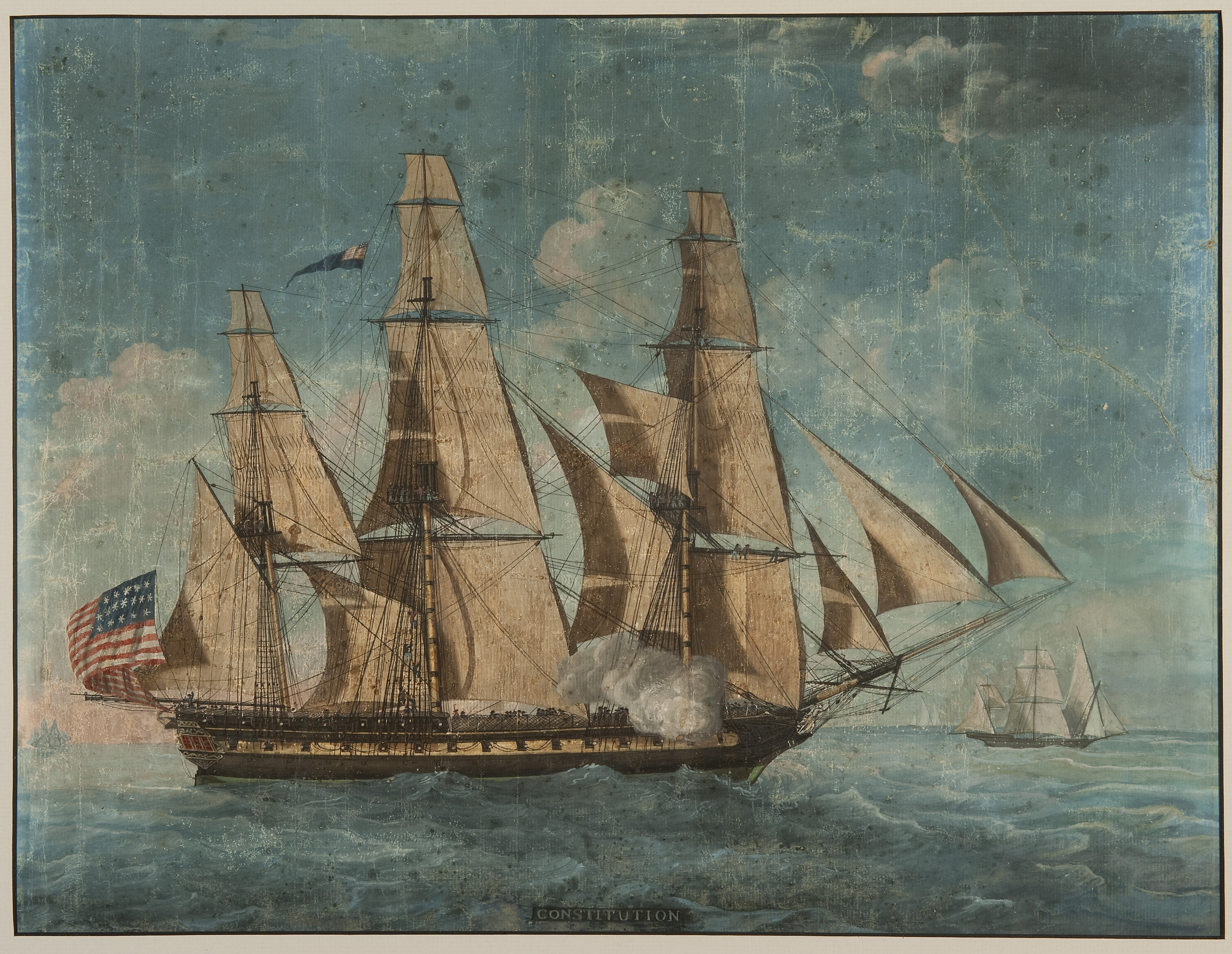
USS Constitution

Shortly after his recapture and destruction of Philadelphia, Decatur was given command of the frigate Constitution, a post he held from October 28 to November 9, 1804. Upon the day of Decatur's return with Intrepid, Commodore Preble wrote to Secretary of the Navy Benjamin Stoddert recommending to President Jefferson that Decatur be promoted to captain. Decatur was promoted to captain with the date of rank February 16, 1804. He was promoted to captain at the age twenty-five, largely for his daring capture and destruction of Philadelphia in Tripoli's harbor, making him the youngest man ever to hold the rank.

On September 10, 1804, Barron arrived at Tripoli with two ships, President and Constellation, whereupon Commodore Preble relinquished command of his blockading squadron to him. Before returning to the United States he sailed to Malta in Constitution on September 14, so it could be caulked and refitted. From there he sailed to Syracuse in Argus, where on September 24 he ordered Decatur to sail this vessel back to Malta to take command of Constitution. From here Decatur sailed Constitution back to Tripoli to join Constellation and Congress, the blockading force stationed there now under the command of Barron. On November 6, he relinquished command of Constitution to Commodore John Rodgers, his senior, in exchange for the smaller vessel Congress. In need of new sails and other repairs Rodgers sailed Constitution to Lisbon on November 27, where it remained for approximately six weeks.

== Marriage ==
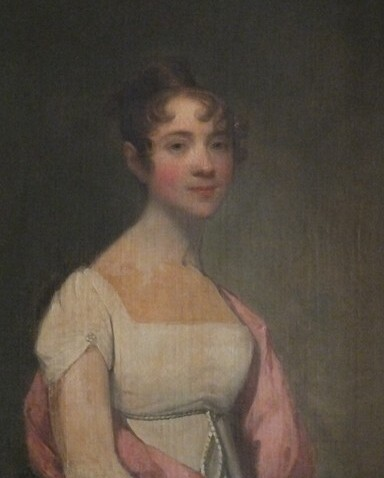
Susan Wheeler Decatur, portrait c 1810

On March 8, 1806, Decatur married Susan Wheeler (1776-1860), the daughter of Luke Wheeler, the mayor of Norfolk, Virginia. She was well known for her beauty and intelligence among Norfolk and Washington society. They had met at a dinner and ball held by the mayor for a Tunisian ambassador who was in the United States negotiating peace terms for his country's recent defeat at Tunis under the silent guns of John Rodgers and Decatur. Before marrying Susan, Decatur had already vowed to serve in the U.S. Navy and maintained that to abandon his service to his country for personal reasons would make him unworthy of her hand. Susan was once pursued by Vice President Aaron Burr and Jérôme Bonaparte, brother to Napoleon, both of whom she turned down. For several months after their marriage the couple resided with Susan's parents in Norfolk, after which Stephen received orders sending him to Newport to supervise the building of gunboats. The couple never had children during their fourteen years of marriage.

== Supervision of shipbuilding ==
In the spring of 1806, Decatur was given command of a squadron of gunboats stationed in the Chesapeake Bay at Norfolk, Virginia, the home of his future wife, Susan Wheeler. He had long requested such an assignment; however, one of his colleagues believed that his request was also motivated by a desire to be close to Wheeler. While stationed here Decatur took the opportunity to court Miss Wheeler, whom he would soon marry that year. After their marriage in March, Decatur lived with his wife's family in Norfolk until June when Secretary of the Navy Robert Smith gave him orders to supervise the building of four gunboats at Newport, Rhode Island, and four others in Connecticut of which he would later take command. Having drawn many illustrations of and designed and built many models of ships, along with having experience as a ship builder and designer from when he was employed at Gurney and Smith in 1797 while overseeing the construction of the frigate United States, Decatur was a natural choice for this new position. Decatur and his wife Susan lived together all through this period.

== Chesapeake–Leopard affair ==
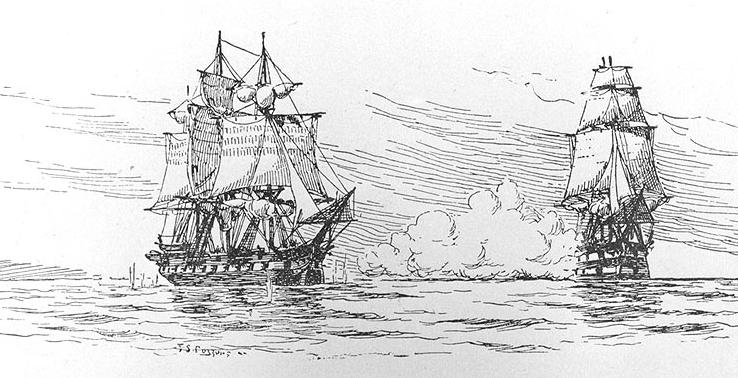
HMS Leopard engaging USS Chesapeake

After overseeing the completion of gunboats, Decatur returned to Norfolk in March 1807 and was given command of the Naval Yard at Gosport. While commissioned there he received a letter from the residing British consul to turn over three deserters from the British ship Melampus who had enlisted in the American Navy through Lieutenant Arthur Sinclair, who was recruiting crew members for Chesapeake, which was at this time in Washington being outfitted for its coming voyage to the Mediterranean. Since the recruiting party was not under the command of Decatur, he refused to intervene. Sinclair also declined to take any action, claiming that he did not have the authority or any such orders from a superior officer. The matter was then referred to the British minister at Washington, a Mr. Erskine, who in turn referred the matter to the Navy Department through Barron, demanding that the three deserters be surrendered to British authority. It was soon discovered that the deserters were American citizens who had been impressed into the Royal Navy, and since the existing American treaty with Britain only pertained to criminal fugitives of justice, not deserters in the military, Barron accordingly also refused to turn them over.

Soon thereafter Chesapeake left Norfolk, and after stopping briefly at Washington for further preparations, set sail for the Mediterranean on June 22. In little time she was pursued by HMS Leopard, which at the time was part of a British squadron in Lynnhaven Bay. Upon closing with Chesapeake, Barron was hailed by the captain of Leopard and informed of a demand from Vice-Admiral Humphreys that Chesapeake be searched for deserters. Barron found the demand extraordinarily bold. When he refused to surrender any of his crew, Leopard soon opened fire on Chesapeake. Having just put to sea, Chesapeake was not prepared to do battle and was unable to return fire. Inside twenty minutes, three of her crew were killed and eighteen wounded. Barron struck the ship's colors (Note: Striking the colors, lowering a ship's flag, was an international signal of surrender.) and surrendered his ship, whereupon she was boarded and the alleged deserters were taken into British custody. News of the incident soon reached President Jefferson, the Department of the Navy and Decatur, who was outraged, was the one who was first confronted with the matter. The incident soon came to be referred to as the Chesapeake–Leopard affair, an event whose controversy would lead to a duel between Barron and Decatur some years later, as Decatur served on Barron's court-martial and later was one of the most outspoken critics of the questionable handling of Chesapeake.

== Command of USS Chesapeake ==
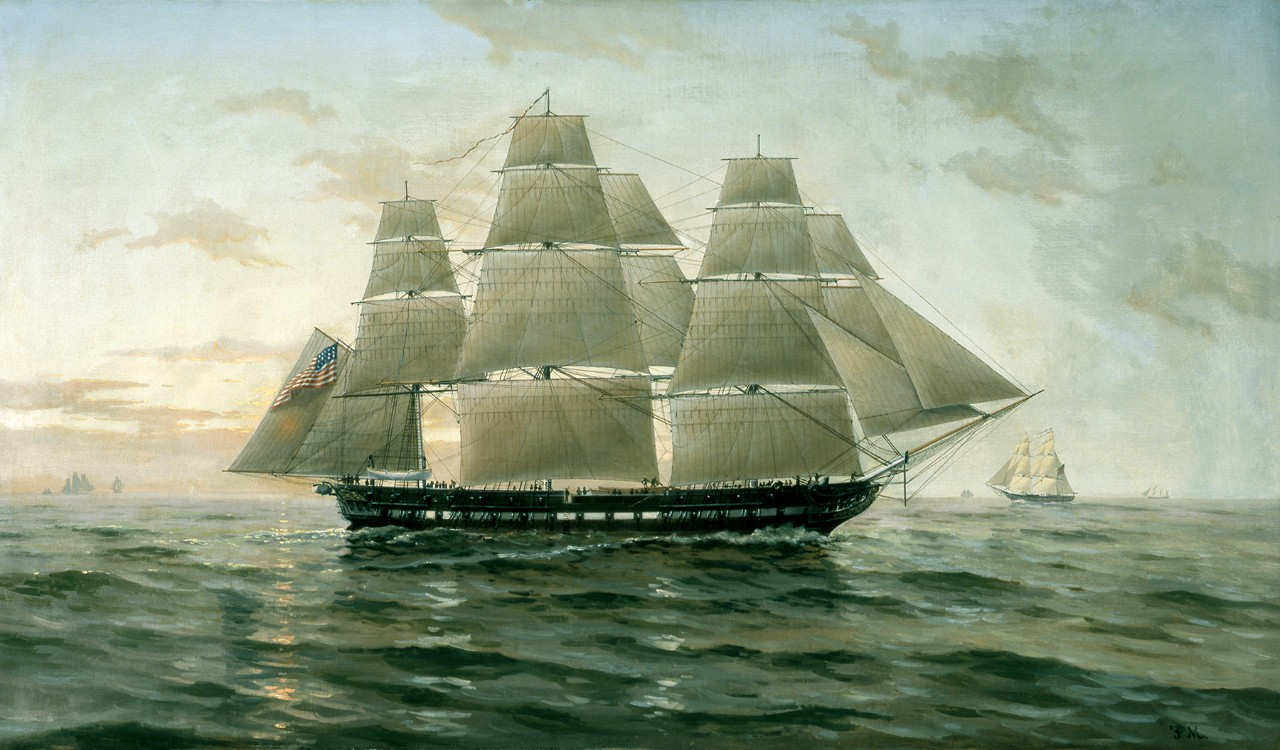
USS Chesapeake

On June 26, 1807, Decatur was appointed to command Chesapeake, a 38-gun frigate, along with command of all gunboats at Norfolk. Chesapeake had just returned to Norfolk after repairs to damage incurred during the Chesapeake–Leopard affair. Barron had just been relieved of command following his court martial over the incident. Decatur was a member of that court martial, which had found Barron guilty of "unpreparedness", barring him from command for five years. Consequently, Barron's previous orders to sail for the Mediterranean were canceled and Chesapeake was instead assigned to Commodore Decatur, with a squadron of gunboats, to patrol the New England coast enforcing the Embargo Act throughout 1809. Unable to command, Barron left the country for Copenhagen and remained there through the War of 1812. Before Decatur assumed command of Chesapeake he learned from observers, and then informed the Navy Secretary, that the British ships HMS Bellona and HMS Triumph were lightening their ballasts to prepare for a blockade at Norfolk.

During this segment of his life, Decatur's father, Stephen Decatur Sr., died in November 1808 at the age of 57, with his mother's death following the next year. Both parents were buried at St. Peter's Church in Philadelphia.

== Command of USS United States ==
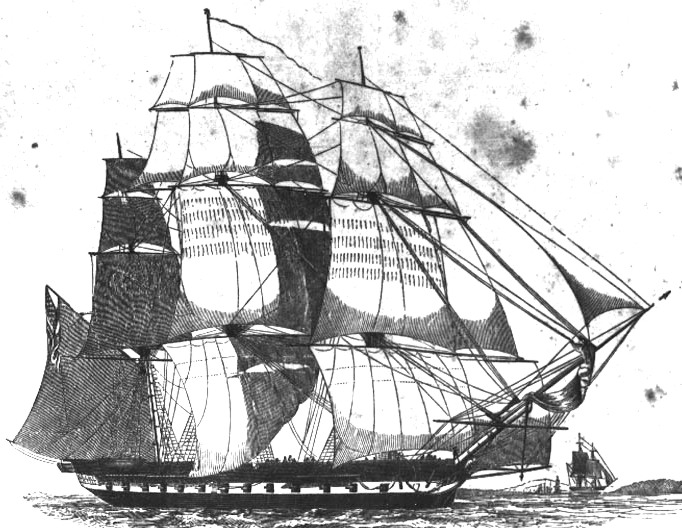
USS United States

In May 1810, Decatur was appointed commander of United States, a heavy frigate with 44 guns. This was the same vessel that he supervised the building of while employed at Gurney and Smith, and the same ship, then under the command of John Barry, on which he had commenced his naval career as midshipman in 1798. The frigate had just been commissioned and was outfitted and supplied for service at sea. After taking command of United States, now the rallying point of the young American Navy, Decatur sailed to most of the naval ports on the eastern seaboard and was well received at each stop. On May 21, 1811, he sailed United States from Norfolk along with USS Hornet on assignment to patrol the coast, returning to Norfolk on November 23 of that year. In 1812 he sailed with Argus and Congress but were soon recalled upon receiving news about the outbreak of war with Britain. There Decatur joined Captain John Rodgers, commander of President and his squadron. On this cruise Rodgers failed to accomplish his mission of intercepting the fleet of English West-Indiamen. On August 31, Decatur sailed United States to Boston. On October 8, he sailed a second cruise with Rodgers' squadron.

== War of 1812 ==
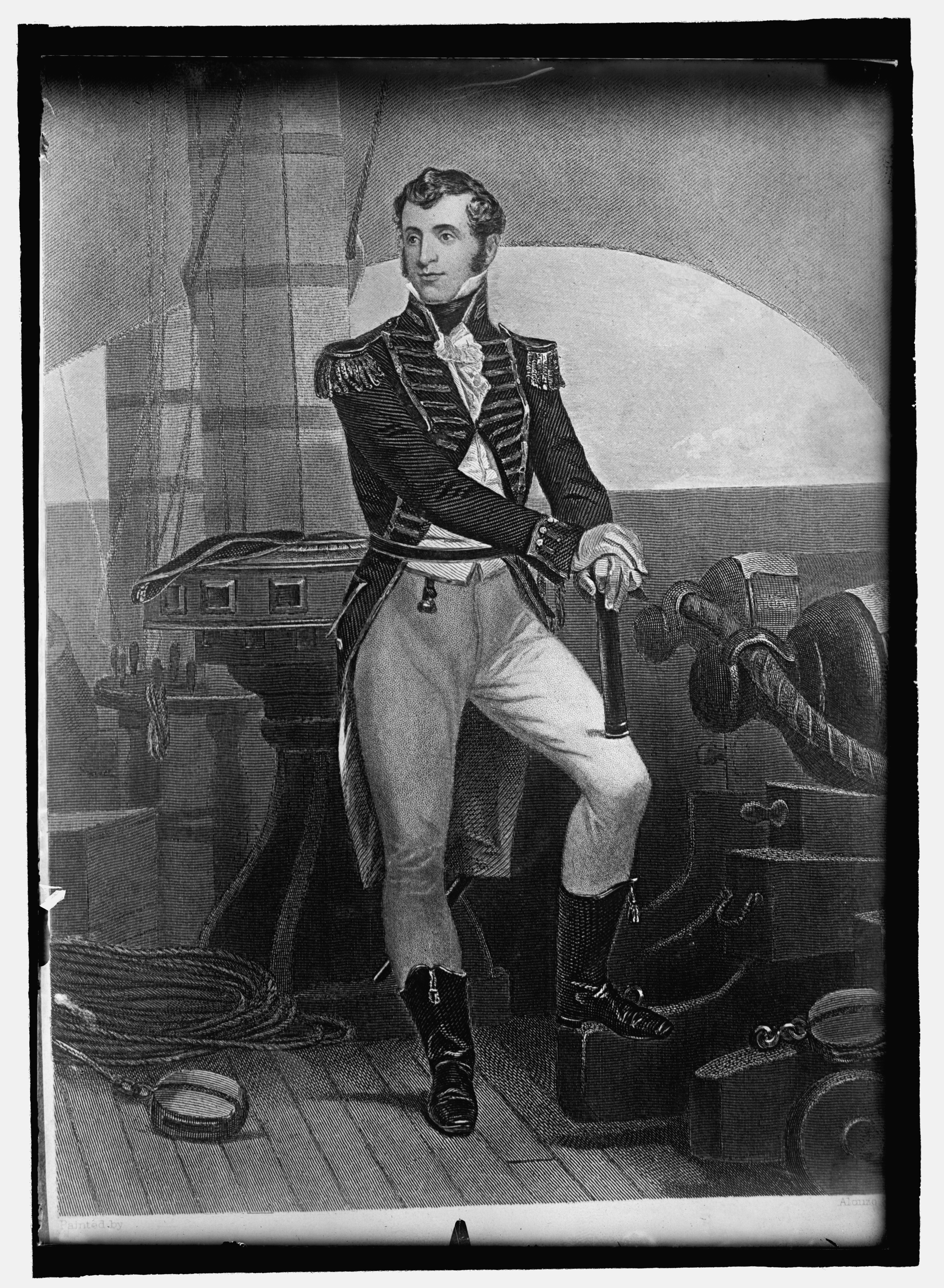
Stephen Decatur by Alonzo Chappel

The desire for expansion into the Northwest Territory, the capture and impressment of American citizens into the Royal Navy along with British alliance with, and recruitment of, American Indian tribes against America, were all events that led into the War of 1812. Intended to avoid war, the Embargo Act only compounded matters that led to war. Finally on June 18, 1812, the United States declared war on Great Britain. By 1814 Britain had committed nearly 100 warships along the American coast and other points. Consequently, the war was fought mostly in the naval theater where Decatur and other naval officers played major roles in the success of the United States' efforts during this time.

Upon the onset of the war President James Madison ordered several naval vessels to be dispatched to patrol the American coastline. The U.S. flagships President, Essex and the Hornet were joined in lower New York Harbor by United States commanded by Decatur, Congress, and Argus. Secretary of State James Monroe (Note: Monroe was later appointed Secretary of War in September 1814.) had originally considered a plan that would simply use U.S. naval vessels as barriers guarding their entrances, but the unpopular plan never materialized.

Three days after the United States declared war against Britain, a squadron under the command of Commodore John Rodgers in President, along with Commodore Stephen Decatur of United States, Argus, Essex and Hornet, departed from the harbor at New York City. As soon as Rodgers received news of the declaration of war, fearing that the order to confine naval ships to port would be reconsidered by Congress, he and his squadron departed New York Bay within the hour. The squadron patrolled the waters off the American Upper East Coast until the end of August, their first objective being a British fleet reported to have recently departed from the West Indies.

=== United States vs Macedonian ===
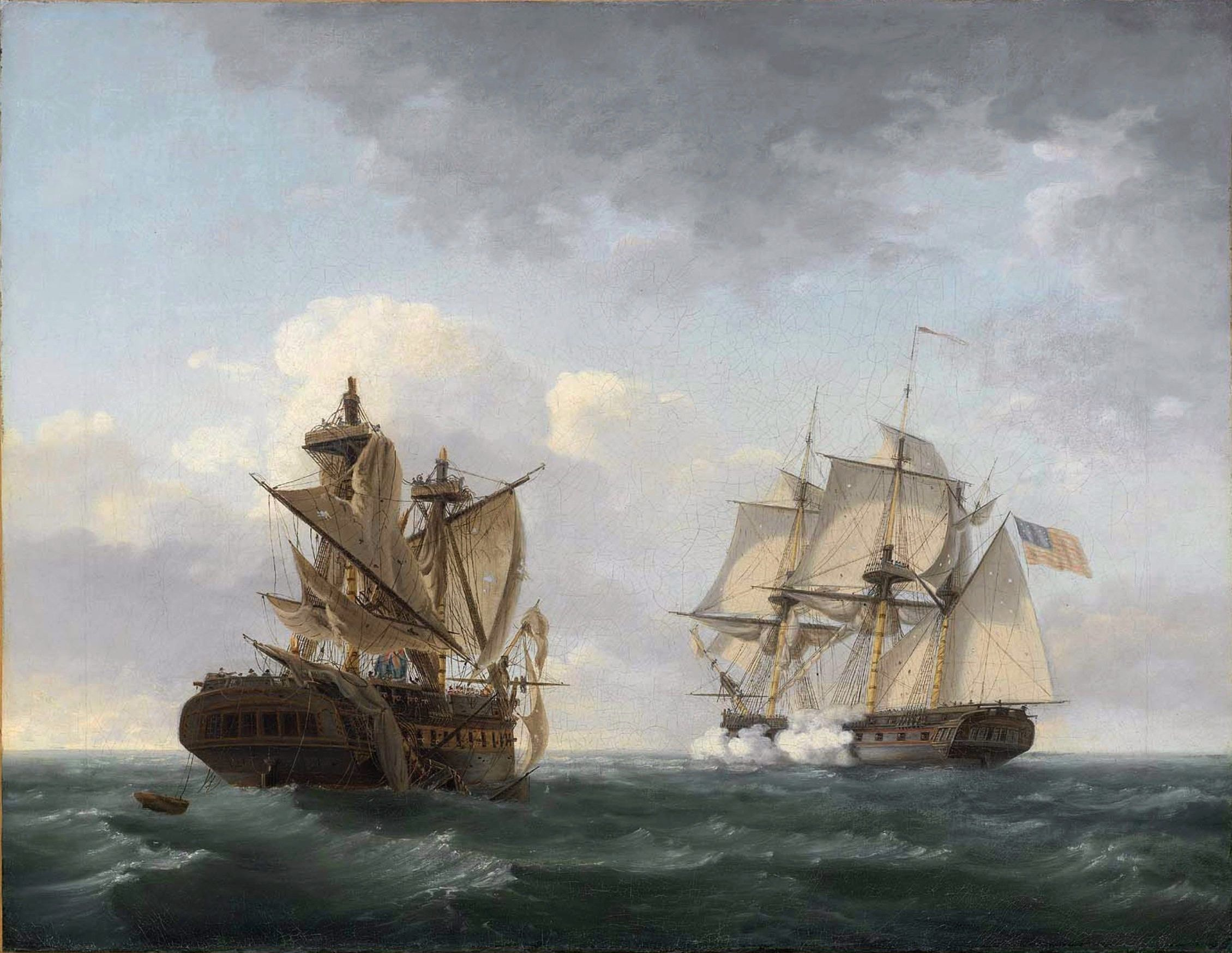
United States engaging Macedonian, by Thomas Birch

Rodgers' squadron again sailed on October 8, 1812, this time from Boston, Massachusetts. Three days later, after capturing Mandarin, Decatur separated from Rodgers and his squadron and with United States continued to cruise eastward. At dawn on October 25, five hundred miles south of the Azores, lookouts on board reported seeing a sail 12 miles to windward. As the ship slowly rose over the horizon, Captain Decatur made out the fine, familiar lines of HMS Macedonian, a British frigate bearing 38 guns.

Macedonian and United States had been berthed next to one another in 1810, in port at Norfolk, Virginia. Macedonian's captain, John Surman Carden, bet a fur beaver hat that if the two ever met in battle, Macedonian would emerge victorious. However, the engagement in a heavy swell proved otherwise as United States pounded Macedonian into a dismasted wreck from long range. During the engagement Decatur was standing on a box of shot when he was knocked down almost unconscious when a flying splinter struck him in the chest. Wounded, he soon recovered and was on his feet in command again. Because of the greater range of the guns aboard United States, Decatur and his crew got off seventy broadsides, with Macedonian only getting off thirty, and consequently emerged from the battle relatively unscathed. Macedonian had no option but surrender, and thus was taken as a prize by Decatur. Eager to present the nation with a prize, Decatur and his crew spent two weeks repairing and refitting their prize to prepare it for its journey across the Atlantic to the United States.

=== Blockade at New London ===
After undergoing routine repairs at New York, United States was part of a small squadron that included the newly captured USS Macedonian (formerly HMS Macedonian) and the sloop of war Hornet. On May 24, 1813, the squadron departed New York. On that same night United States was struck by lightning which shattered its main mast. By June 1, Decatur's squadron encountered a powerful British squadron on patrol and under the command of Sir Thomas Masterman Hardy. Hardy's squadron, which emerged from behind Montauk Point, consisted of the ships of the line HMS Ramillies and HMS Valiant along with the frigates HMS Acasta and HMS Orpheus. Realizing his only chance for escape was to set a course for New London, Decatur was forced to flee and take refuge at that port where they were blockaded until the end of the war.

Decatur attempted to sneak out of New London harbor at night in an effort to elude the British blockading squadron. On the evening of December 18, while attempting to leave the Thames River, Decatur saw blue lights burning near the mouth of the river in sight of the British blockaders. Decatur was furious, believing that various residents had set the signals to betray his plans. He abandoned the project and returned to New London. In a letter to the Navy Secretary, dated December 20, Decatur charged that traitors in the New London area were in collusion with the British to capture United States, Hornet and Macedonian. The allegations of treason soon became public, causing controversy and debate among New London residents and others over the matter. A congressional investigation was called while Decatur made efforts to discover who was responsible but was unsuccessful. Whether the signals were given by a British spy or an American citizen remains uncertain. Democratic-Republicans (the then-future Democratic Party) immediately blamed the Federalists who were adamantly against the war from the beginning, and so here earned themselves the name "Blue-light Federalists".

Unable to get his squadron out of the harbor, Decatur decided to write a letter to Captain Thomas Hardy offering to negotiate a resolution of the situation at a prearranged meeting. He proposed that matched ships from either side meet and, in effect, have a duel, to settle their otherwise idle situation. The letter was sent under a flag of truce but was in violation of orders, as after the loss of Chesapeake, Navy Secretary Jones forbade commanders from "giving or receiving a Challenge, to or from, an Enemy's vessel." The next day Hardy gave answer to Decatur's proposal and agreed to have Statira engage Macedonian "as they are sister ships, carrying the same number of guns, and weight of metal." After further deliberation Decatur wanted assurance that Macedonian would not be recaptured should the ship emerge victorious, as he suspected it would be. After several communications it was ascertained that neither side could trust the other and so the proposal floundered, never coming to fruition.

=== Command of USS President ===
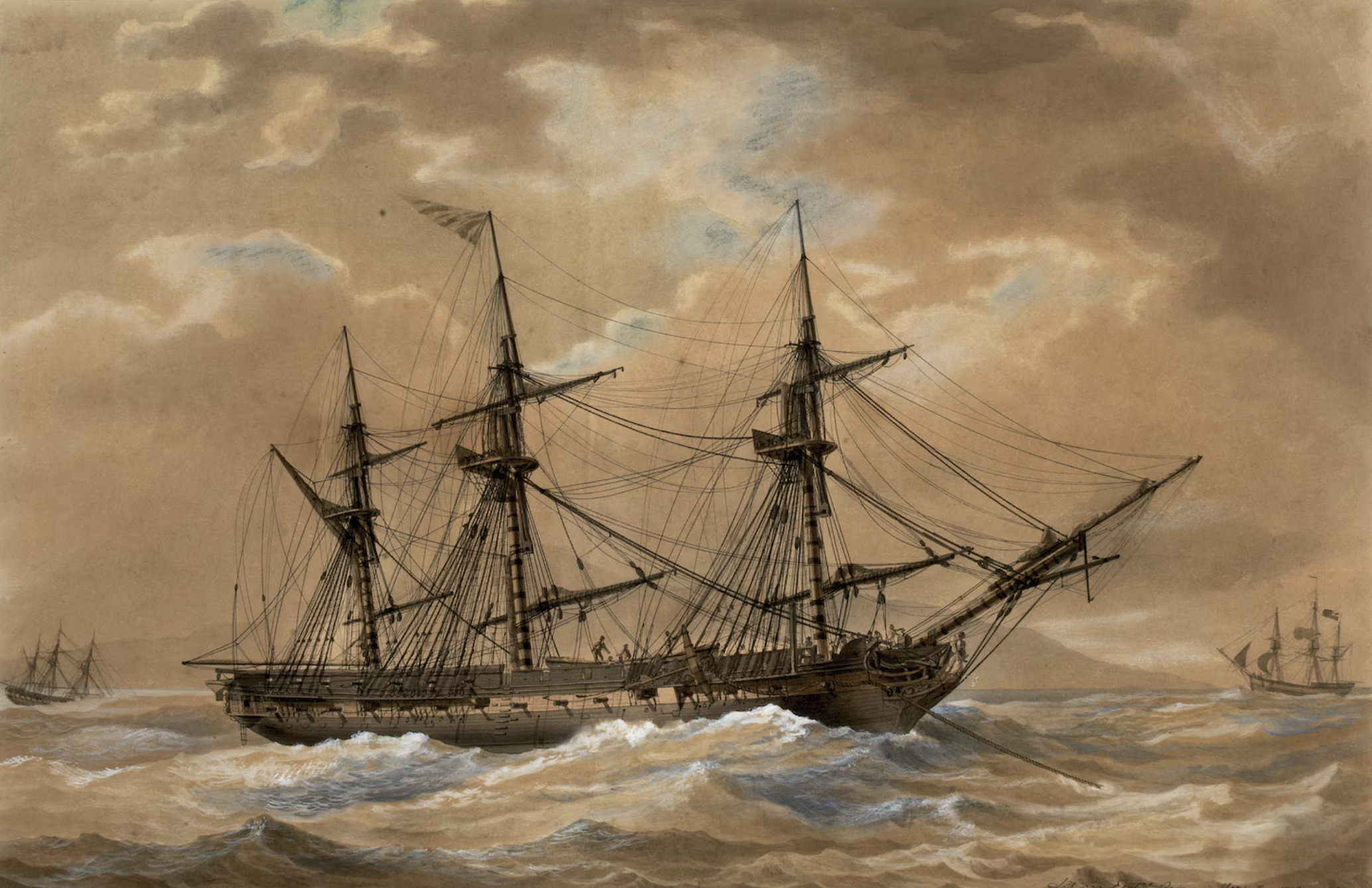
1802 painting of USS President by Antoine Roux

In May 1814, Decatur transferred his commodore's pennant to President, a frigate with 44 guns. By December 1, 1814, Secretary of the Navy William Jones, a staunch proponent of coastal defense, appointed Decatur to lead a four-ship squadron comprising President, which would be the flagship of his new squadron, along with Hornet, a sloop bearing 20 guns, USS Peacock bearing 22 and USS Tom Bowline bearing 12 guns. In January 1815, Decatur's squadron was assigned a mission in the East Indies. However, the British had established a strict blockade in the squadron's port of New York, therefore restricting any cruises.

On January 14, a severe snowstorm developed, forcing the British squadron away from the coast, but by the next day the storm had subsided, allowing the British fleet to take up positions to the northwest in anticipation of the American fleet trying to escape. The next day President emerged from the west, and Decatur attempted to break through the blockade alone in President and make for the appointed rendezvous at Tristan da Cunha, but encountered the British West Indies Squadron composed of razee HMS Majestic bearing 56 guns, under the command of Captain John Hayes, along with the frigates HMS Endymion, bearing 40 guns, commanded by Captain Henry Hope, HMS Pomone, bearing 38 guns, commanded by Captain John Richard Lumley, and HMS Tenedos, bearing 38 guns, commanded by Captain Hyde Parker.

Decatur had made arrangements for "pilot boats" to mark the way for clear passage out to sea, but due to a plotting error the pilot boats took up the wrong positions and consequently President was accidentally run aground. After an hour upon the sandbar, with Decatur's ship procuring damage to the copper and pintles, the ship finally broke free. Decatur continued the attempt to evade his pursuers and set course along the southerly coast of Long Island. As Endymion was the fastest ship in the engagement, she was the only ship to catch up to and engage President. After a fierce fight lasting several hours, during which both ships were severely damaged (Endymion's headsails & President's hull), Decatur reluctantly surrendered to Endymion as there were four remaining British ships he would have to fight. Decatur's command suffered 35 men killed and 70 wounded, including Decatur himself who was wounded by a large flying splinter.

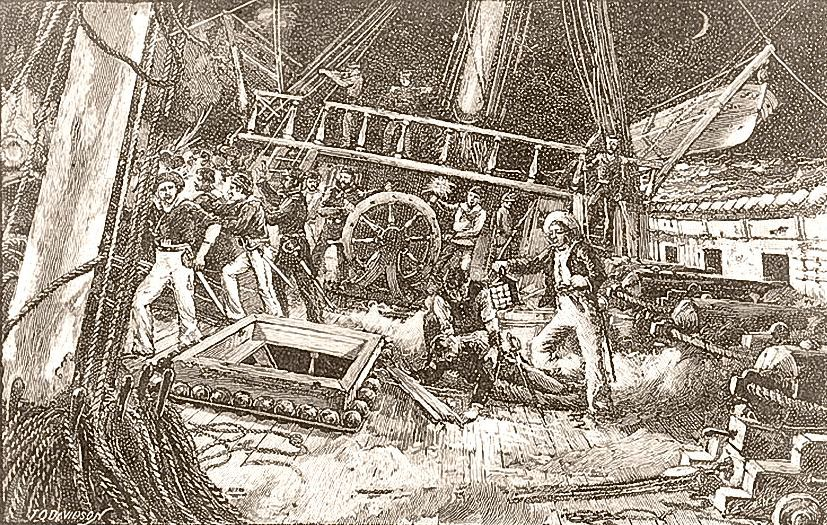
Decatur lying wounded aboard President

Endymion had sustained severe damage to the rigging, and her captain, Hope, decided to carry out repairs before tying up President. While this was happening Decatur made an attempt to escape. Decatur's frigate was finally overtaken by Pomone. Unaware that Decatur had surrendered, and then tried to flee, Pomone fired two broadsides into President before they realized that the battle was over. When boats from Pomone boarded President Decatur said "I surrender my sword to the captain of the black ship", a reference to Hope of HMS Endymion. After surrendering a second time, Decatur later claimed, "my ship crippled, and more than a four-fold force opposed to me, without a chance of escape left, I deemed it my duty to surrender."

Majestic soon caught up with the British fleet. Decatur, now dressed in full dress uniform, boarded Majestic and surrendered his sword to Captain Hayes. Hayes in a gesture of admiration returned the sword to Decatur saying that he was "proud in returning the sword of an officer, who had defended his ship so nobly." Before taking possession of President, Hayes allowed Decatur to return to his ship to perform burial services for the officers and seamen who had died in the engagement. He was also allowed to write a letter to his wife. Decatur along with surviving crew were taken prisoner and held captive in a Bermuda prison, arriving January 26, and were held there until February 1815.

Upon the Americans' arrival at the prison in Bermuda, the British naval officers there extended various courtesies and provisions that they felt were due to a man of Decatur's stature. The senior naval officer at the prison took the earliest opportunity to parole Decatur to New London, and on February 8, with news of the cessation of hostilities, Decatur traveled aboard HMS Narcissus (32), landing in New London on February 21. On February 26, Decatur arrived in New York City, where he convalesced in a boarding house. At war's end Decatur received a sword as a reward and thanks from Congress for his service in Tripoli and was also awarded the Congressional Gold Medal for distinguished service in the War of 1812.

== Second Barbary War ==
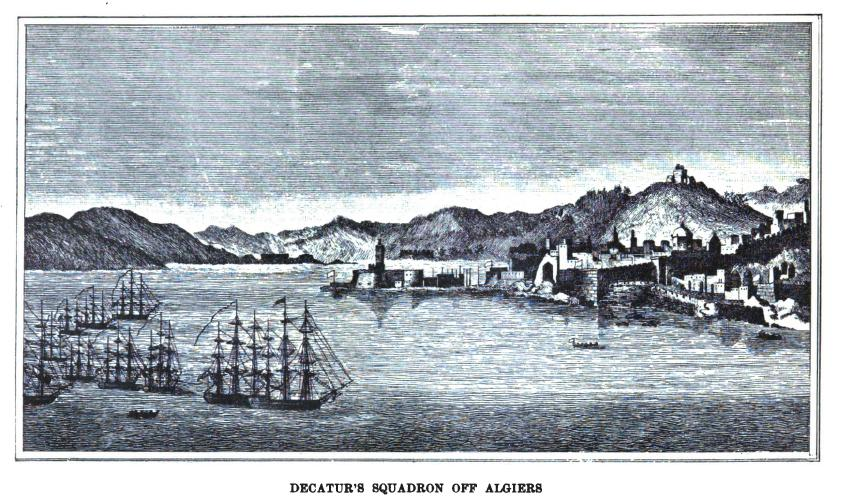
Decatur's squadron off Algiers, 1815

Now that war with Britain was over, the United States could concentrate on pressing matters in the Mediterranean, at Algiers. As had occurred during the First Barbary War American merchant ships and crews were once again being seized and held for large ransoms. On February 23, 1815, President Madison urged Congress to declare war. Congress approved the act but did not declare war against Algiers. Madison had chosen Benjamin Williams Crowninshield as the new Secretary of the Navy, replacing William Jones.

Two squadrons were then assembled, one at New York, under the command of Stephen Decatur, and one at Boston, under the command of Commodore William Bainbridge. Decatur's squadron of ten ships was ready first and set sail for Algiers on May 20. At this time it was the largest US fleet ever assembled. Decatur was in command of the flagship USS Guerriere. (Note: The ten vessels were: Frigates: USS Guerrier (flagship), USS Macedonian and USS Constellation; sloop of war USS Ontario; brigs USS Epervier, USS Firefly, USS Flambeau and USS Spark; schooners USS Spitfire and USS Torch. Three of these vessels were prizes taken in the War of 1812.) Aboard was William Shaler who had just been appointed by Madison as the consul-general for the Barbary States, acting as joint commissioner with Commodores Decatur and Bainbridge. Shaler was in possession of a letter authorizing them to negotiate terms of peace with the Algerian government. Because of Decatur's great successes in the War of 1812 and for his knowledge of and past experience at the Algerian port, Crowninshield chose him to command the lead ship in the naval squadron to Algiers.

The US was demanding the release of Americans held captive as slaves, an end of annual payments of tribute, and finally to procure favorable prize agreements. Decatur was prepared to negotiate peace or resort to military measures. Eager to know the Bey's decision, Decatur dispatched the president's letter which ultimately prompted the Bey to abandon his practice of piracy and kidnapping and come to terms with the United States.

=== Command of USS Guerriere ===
On May 20, 1815, Commodore Decatur received instructions from President James Madison to take command of the frigate USS Guerriere and lead a squadron of ten ships to the Mediterranean Sea to conduct the Second Barbary War, which would put an end to the international practice of paying tribute to the Barbary pirate states. His squadron arrived at Gibraltar on June 14.

Before committing himself to the Mediterranean, Decatur learned from the American consuls at Cádiz and Tangier of any squadrons passing by along the Atlantic coast or through the Strait of Gibraltar. To avoid making known the presence of an American squadron, Decatur did not enter the ports but instead dispatched a messenger in a small boat to communicate with the consuls. He learned from observers there that a squadron under the command of the notorious Rais Hamidou had passed by into the Mediterranean, most likely off Cape Gata. Decatur's squadron arrived at Gibraltar on June 15, 1815. This attracted much attention and prompted the departure of several dispatch vessels to warn Rais of the squadron's arrival. Decatur's visit was brief with the consul and lasted only for as long as it took to communicate with a short letter to the Secretary of the Navy informing him of earlier weather problems and that he was about to "proceed in search of the enemy forthwith", where he at once set off in search of Hamidou hoping to take him by surprise.

On June 17, while sailing in Guerriere for Algiers, Decatur's fleet encountered near Cape Palos the frigate Mashouda, commanded by Hamidou and the Algerian brig Estedio, which were also en route to Algeria. After overtaking the Mashouda, Decatur fired two broadsides, crippling the ship, killing 30 of the crew, including Hamidou himself, and taking more than 400 prisoners. Lloyd's List reported that the Algerine frigate Mezoura, which had been under the command of the Algerine admiral, had arrived at Carthagena on June 20 as a prize to Decatur's squadron. The newspaper also reported that Decatur's squadron had run another Spanish frigate onshore near Carthagena.

Capturing the flagship of the Algerian fleet at the Battle off Cape Gata Decatur was able to secure sufficient levying power to bargain with the Dey of Algiers. Upon arrival, Decatur exhibited an early use of gunboat diplomacy on behalf of American interests as a reminder that this was the only alternative if the Dey decided to decline signing a treaty. Consequently, a new treaty was agreed upon within 48 hours of Decatur's arrival, confirming the success of his objectives.

After bringing the government in Algiers to terms, Decatur's squadron set sail to Tunis and Tripoli to demand reimbursement for proceeds withheld by those governments during the War of 1812. With a similar show of force exhibited at Algiers, Decatur achieved concessions to all of his demands and promptly sailed home victorious. Upon his arrival Decatur boasted to the Secretary of the Navy that the settlement had "been dictated at the mouths of our cannon." For this campaign, he became known as "the Conqueror of the Barbary Pirates".

== Domestic life ==
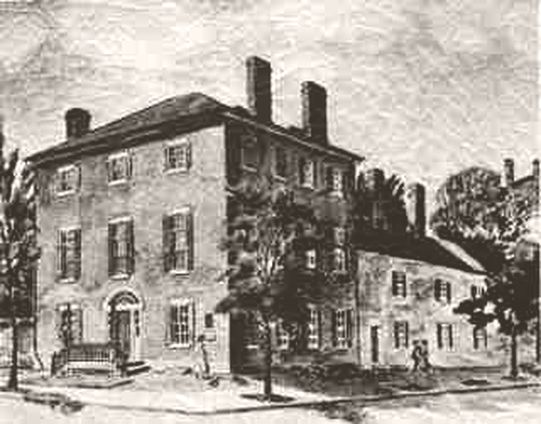
Stephen Decatur Home in Washington, D.C.

After his victory in the Mediterranean, Decatur returned to the United States, arriving at New York on November 12, 1815, with the brig Enterprise, along with Bainbridge of Guerriere who arrived three days later. He was met with a wide reception from dignitaries and countrymen. Among the more notable salutations was a letter Decatur received from the Secretary of State James Monroe that related the following tidings of appreciation: "I take much interest in informing you that the result of this expedition, so glorious to your country and honorable to yourself and the officers and men under your command, has been very satisfactory to the President."

The Secretary of the Navy, Benjamin Williams Crowninshield, was equally gracious and thankful. Since a vacancy was about to occur in the board of Navy commissioners with the retirement of Commodore Isaac Hull, the Secretary was most anxious to offer the position to Decatur, which he gladly accepted. Upon his appointment Decatur made his journey to Washington, where he was again received with cordial receptions from various dignitaries and countrymen. He served on the Board of Navy Commissioners from 1816 to 1820. One of his more notable decisions as a commissioner involved his strong objection to the reinstatement of Barron upon his return to the United States after being barred from command for five years for his questionable handling of the Chesapeake, an action that would soon lead to Barron challenging him to a duel.

During his tenure as a Commissioner, Decatur also became active in the Washington social scene. At a social gathering in April 1816, Decatur uttered an after-dinner toast that would become famous:

Our country – in her intercourse with foreign nations, may she always be in the right, and always successful, right or wrong. (Note: The toast is more widely known in the form of a paraphrase that arose decades later (e.g. Mackenzie, 1846, p. 443) with "but right or wrong, our country" instead of the original "and always successful, right or wrong".)

=== Home in Washington, D.C. ===
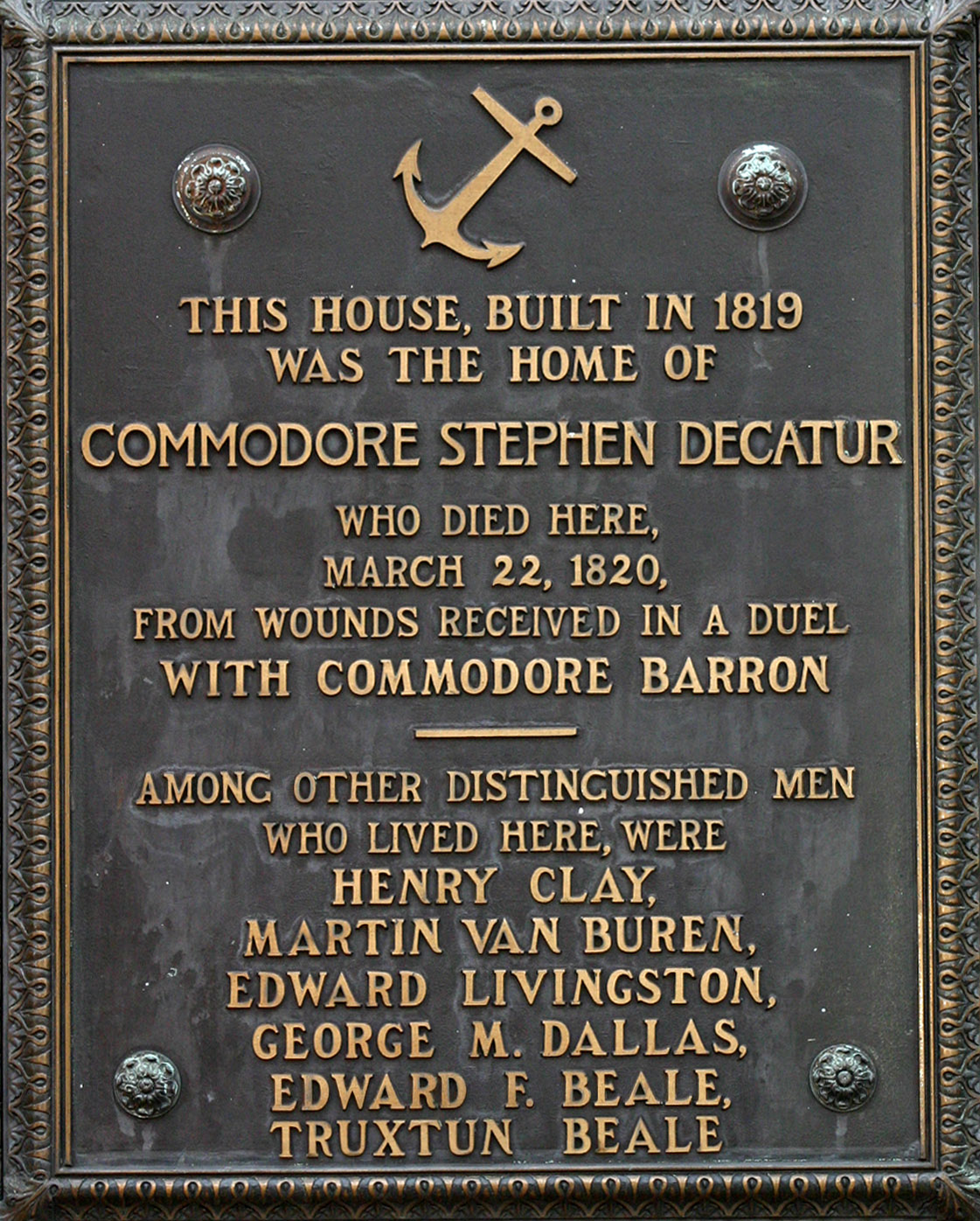
Plaque outside Decatur House, Washington, D.C.

Now that Decatur was Naval Commissioner he had settled into a routine life in Washington working at the Navy Department during the day, with many evenings spent as an honorary guest at social gatherings, as both he and his wife were the toast of Washington society. Decatur's first home in Washington was 1903 Pennsylvania Avenue (one of the "Seven Buildings"), purchased in 1817. In 1818, Decatur built a three-story red brick house in Washington on Lafayette Square, designed by the famous English architect Benjamin Henry Latrobe, the same man who designed the U.S. Capitol building and Saint John's Church. Decatur specified that his house had to be suitable for "impressive entertainments". The house was the first private residence to be built near the White House. Decatur House is now a museum that exhibits a large collection of Decatur memorabilia and is managed by the National Trust for Historic Preservation. Located on President's Square (Lafayette Square), it was built in grand style to accommodate large social gatherings, which in the wake of Decatur's many naval victories were an almost routine affair in the lives of Decatur and his wife.

=== Duel between Perry and Heath ===
In October 1818, at the request of Oliver Hazard Perry, a very close friend, Decatur arrived at New York to act as his second in a duel between Perry and Captain John Heath, commander of Marines on USS Java. The two officers were involved in a personal disagreement while aboard that ship, that resulted in Heath challenging Perry to a duel. Perry had written to Decatur nearly a year previously, revealing that he had no intention of firing any shot at Heath. After the two duelists and their seconds assembled the duel took place. One shot was fired; Heath missed his opponent while Perry, keeping his word, returned no fire. At this point Decatur approached Heath with Perry's letter in hand, relating to Heath that Perry all along had no intention of returning fire and asking Heath if his honor had thus been satisfied. Heath admitted that it had. Decatur was relieved to finally see the matter resolved with no loss of life or limb to either of his friends, urging both to now put the matter behind them.

== Death ==
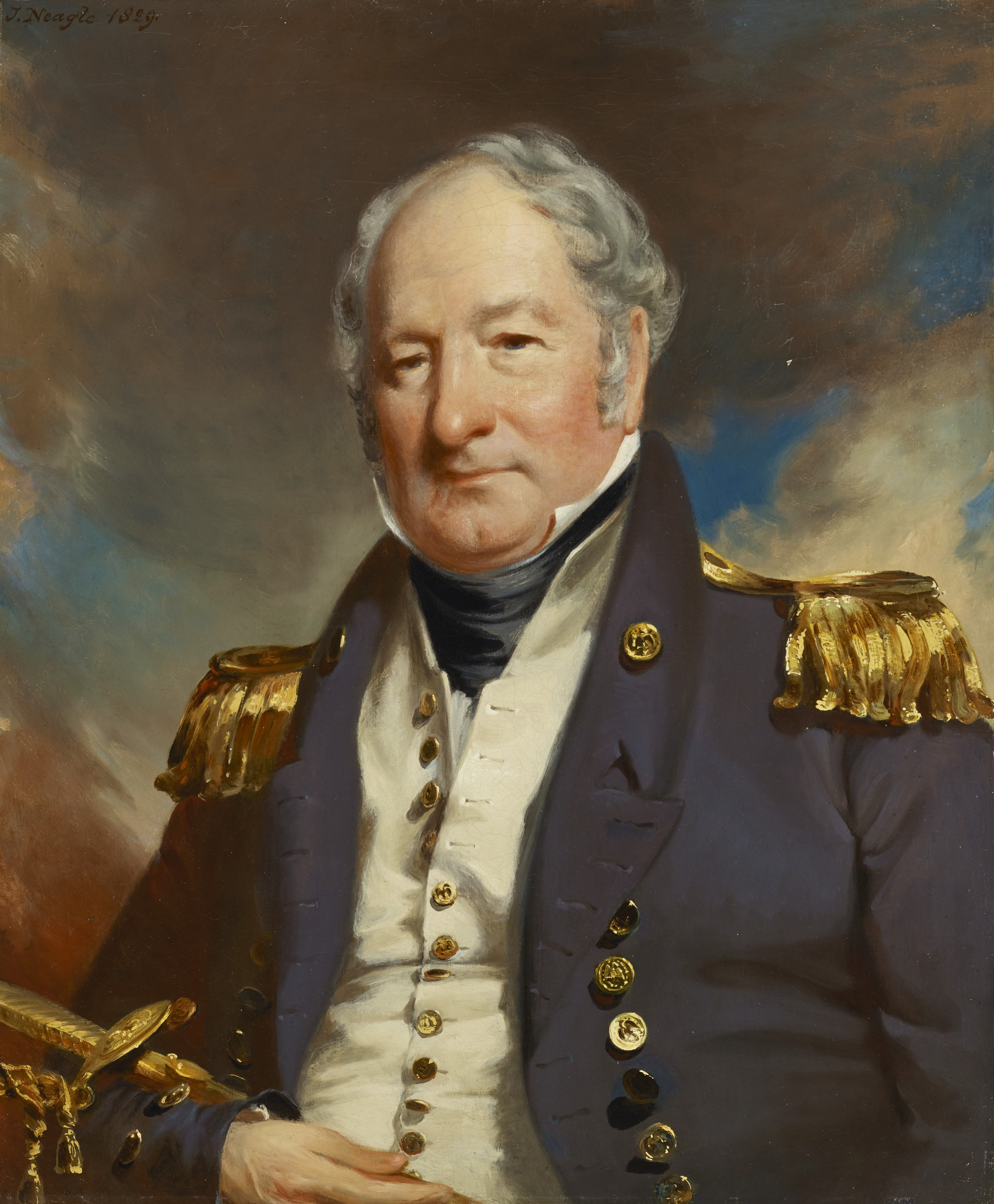
James Barron, officer who killed Decatur in a duel, March 22, 1820

Decatur's life and distinguished service in the U.S. Navy came to an early end when in 1820 Barron challenged Decatur to a duel, related in part to comments Decatur had made over Barron's conduct in the Chesapeake–Leopard affair of 1807. Because of Barron's loss of Chesapeake to the British he faced a court-martial and was barred from command for a term of five years. Decatur had served on the court-martial that had found Barron guilty of "unpreparedness". Barron had just returned to the United States from Copenhagen after being away for six years and was seeking reinstatement. He was met with much criticism among fellow naval officers, among whom Decatur was one of the most outspoken. Decatur, who was now on the board of naval commissioners, strongly opposed Barron's reinstatement and was notably critical about the prospect in communications with other naval officers and government officials. As a result, Barron became embittered towards Decatur and challenged him to a duel. Barron's challenge to Decatur occurred during a period when duels between officers were so common that it was creating a shortage of experienced men, forcing the Department of the Navy to threaten to discharge those who attempted to pursue the practice.

Barron's second was Captain Jesse Elliott, known for his jaunty mannerisms and antagonism toward Decatur. Decatur first asked his friend Thomas Macdonough to be his second, but Macdonough declined the request because he had always opposed dueling. Decatur then turned to his supposed friend Commodore William Bainbridge to act as his second, to which Bainbridge consented. However, according to naval historian Alexander Slidell Mackenzie, Decatur made a poor choice: Bainbridge, who was five years his senior, had long been jealous of the younger and more famous Decatur.

The seconds met on March 8 to establish the time and place for the duel and the rules to be followed. The arrangements were exact. The duel was to take place at nine o'clock in the morning on March 22, at Bladensburg Dueling Grounds, near Washington, at a distance of only eight paces. Decatur, an expert pistol shot, planned only to wound Barron in the hip.

Decatur did not tell his wife, Susan, about the forthcoming duel but instead wrote to her father asking that he come to Washington to stay with her, using language that suggested that he was facing a duel and that he might lose his life. On the morning of the 22nd the dueling party assembled. The conference between the two seconds lasted three-quarters of an hour. Just before the duel, Barron spoke to Decatur of conciliation; however, the men's seconds did not attempt to halt the proceedings.

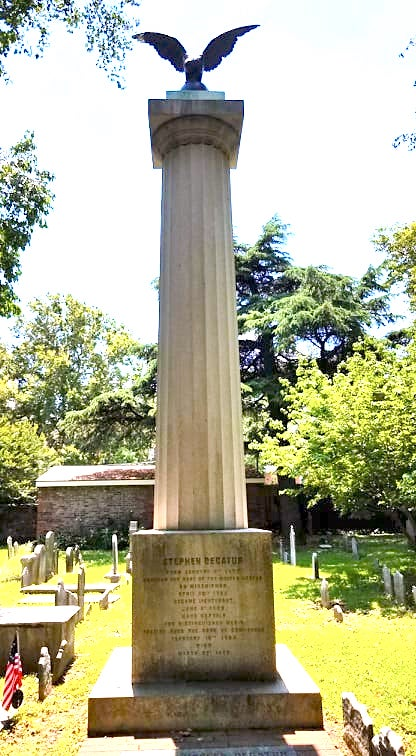
Gravemarker of Stephen Decatur, churchyard of St. Peter's Episcopal Church (Philadelphia)

The duel was arranged by Bainbridge with Elliott in a way that made the wounding or death of both duelists very likely. The shooters would be standing close to each other, face to face; there would be no back-to-back pacing away and turning to fire, a procedure that often resulted in the missing of one's opponent. Upon taking their places the duelists were instructed by Bainbridge, "I shall give the word quickly – 'Present, one, two, three' – You are neither to fire before the word 'one', nor after the word 'three'." Now in their positions, each duelist raised his pistol, cocked the flintlock and, while taking aim, stood in silence. Bainbridge called out, 'One' and Decatur and Barron both fired before the count of 'two'. Decatur's shot hit Barron in the lower abdomen and ricocheted into his thigh. Barron's shot hit Decatur in the pelvic area, severing arteries. Both of the duelists fell almost at the same instant. Decatur, mortally wounded and clutching his side, exclaimed, "Oh, Lord, I am a dead man." Lying wounded, Commodore Barron (who ultimately survived) declared that the duel was carried out properly and honorably and told Decatur that he forgave him from the bottom of his heart.

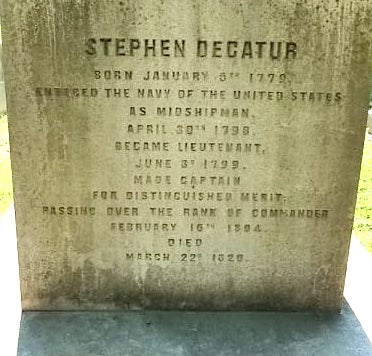
Detail, grave of Stephen Decatur

By then other men who had known about the duel were arriving at the scene, including Decatur's friend and mentor, the senior officer John Rodgers. In excruciating pain, Decatur was carefully lifted by the surgeons and placed in Rodgers' carriage and was carried back to his home on Lafayette Square. Before they departed, Decatur called out to Barron that he should also be taken along, but Rodgers and the surgeons calmly shook their heads in disapproval. Barron cried back "God bless you, Decatur" – and with a weak voice Decatur called back "Farewell, farewell, Barron." Upon arrival at his home, Decatur was taken into the front room just left of the front entrance, still conscious. Before allowing himself to be carried in, he insisted that his wife and nieces be taken upstairs, sparing them the sight of his grave condition. A Dr. Thomas Simms arrived from his home nearby to give his assistance to the naval physicians. However, for reasons not entirely clear to historians, Decatur refused to have the ball extracted from his wound. (Note: Among the current sources only Guttridge mentions Decatur's refusal to have the ball extracted, not citing any reason.) At this point Decatur requested that his will be brought forward so as to receive his signature, granting his wife all his worldly possessions, with directives as to who would be the executors of his will. Decatur died at approximately 10:30 pm that night. While wounded, he is said to have cried out, "I did not know that any man could suffer such pain!"

Washington society and the nation were shocked upon learning that Decatur had been killed at the age of forty-one in a duel with a rival navy captain. Decatur's funeral was attended by Washington's elite, including President James Monroe and the justices of the Supreme Court, as well as most of Congress. Over 10,000 citizens of Washington and the surrounding area attended to pay their last respects to a national hero. The pallbearers were Commodores Rodgers, Chauncey, Tingey, Porter and Macdonough; captains Ballard and Cassin; and Lieutenant Macpherson. Following were naval officers and seamen. At the funeral service a grieving seaman unexpectedly came forward and proclaimed, "He was the friend of the flag, the sailor's friend; the navy has lost its mainmast." Stephen Decatur died childless. Though he left his widow $75,000 (equal to $1,727,679 today), a fortune at the time, she died virtually penniless in 1860. She received an annuity of $630/year (equal to $20,318 today) from her $7,000 donation to Georgetown College (part of Georgetown University) in 1834 and later a $50/month pension from Congress.

Decatur's body was interred in the Barlow family vault at Kalorama in accordance with Susan's request. It was later moved to Philadelphia, where he was buried at St. Peter's Churchyard in 1846, alongside his mother and father.

After the funeral, rumors circulated of a last-minute conversation between the duelists that could have avoided the deadly outcome of the duel and, moreover, that the seconds involved might have been planning for such an outcome and accordingly made no real attempts to stop the duel. Decatur's widow, Susan, held an even more damning view of the matter and spent much of her remaining life pursuing justice for what she termed "the assassins" involved. Susan Decatur also tried for several years to obtain a pension from the U.S. Government. By an act of Congress on March 3, 1837, she was granted a pension retroactive to Decatur's death.

== Legacy ==
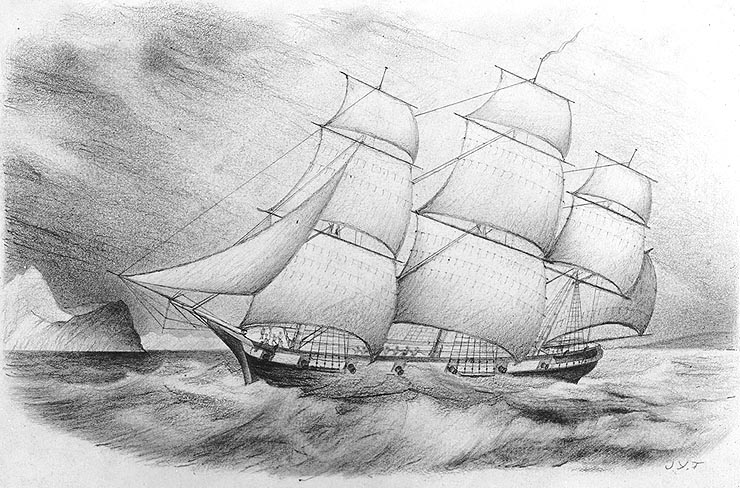
The first USS Decatur, 1839

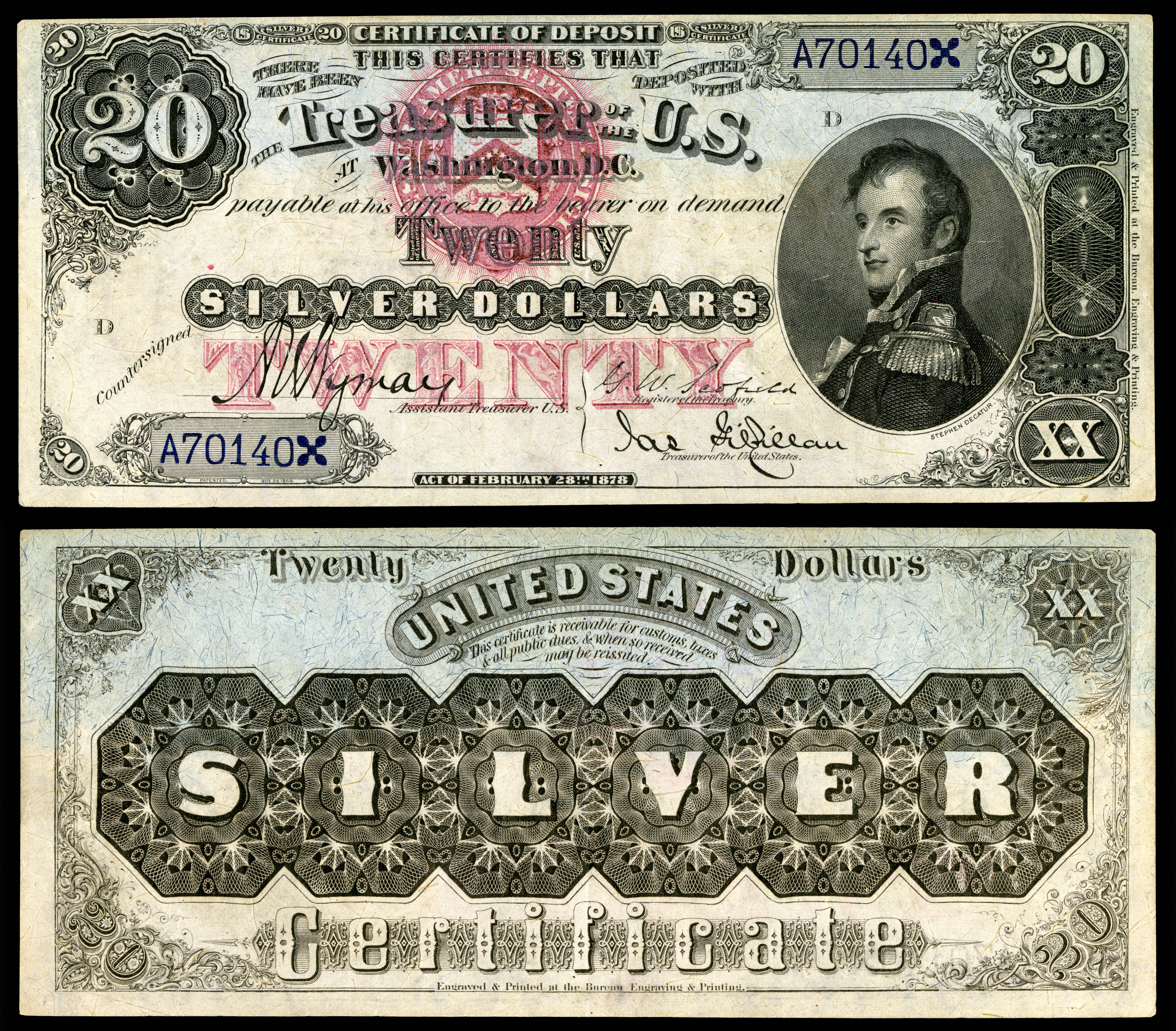
Decatur depicted on the Series 1878 $20 Silver Certificate

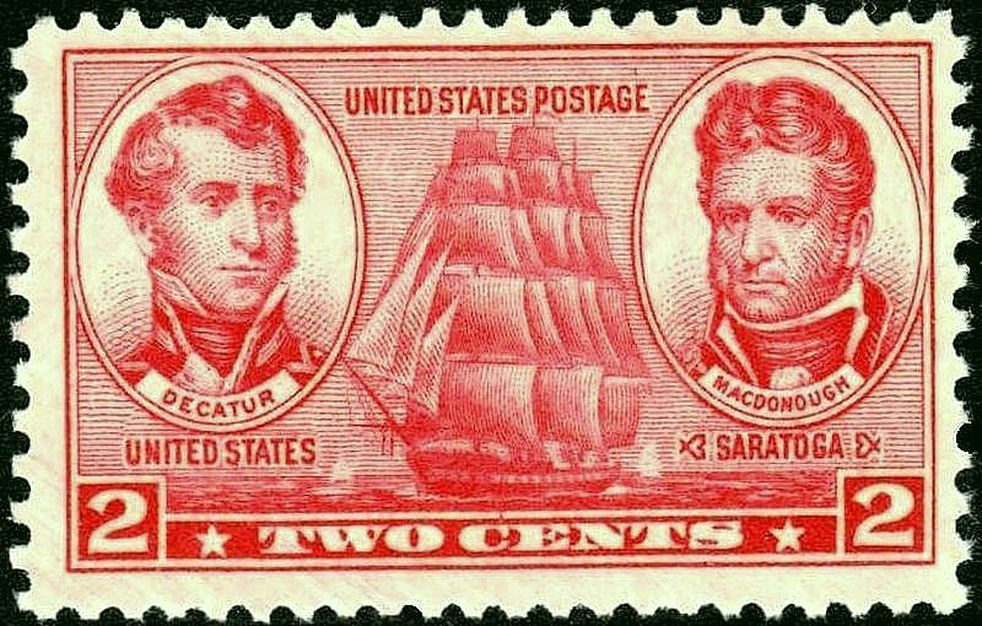
Decatur / Macdonough U.S. postage, Navy Issue of 1937

Although he died at a relatively young age, Decatur helped determine the direction of the young nation playing a significant role establishing its identity. For his heroism in the Barbary Wars and the War of 1812, Decatur emerged as an icon of American naval history and was roundly admired by most of his contemporaries as well as the citizenry:

- Congressional Gold Medal awarded January 29, 1813, to honor capture of HMS Macedonian by USS United States under his command.
- Five U.S. Navy ships have been named USS Decatur.
- At the urging of Franklin D. Roosevelt, the U.S. Post Office Department issued a series of five stamps honoring the U.S. Navy and various naval heroes, Decatur being one of the few chosen, appearing on the 2-cent issue, along with fellow officer Macdonough.
- An engraved portrait of Decatur appears on the Series of 1878/1880 $20 silver certificates.
- His last house has been turned into a museum owned by the National Trust for Historic Preservation.
- At least 46 communities in the United States have been named after Stephen Decatur, including Decatur, Alabama, Decatur, Georgia, Decatur, Illinois, Decatur, Texas, and Decatur, Mississippi.
- Seven counties in the United States have been named after Stephen Decatur, including Decatur County, Alabama (renamed Morgan County, Alabama), Decatur County, Georgia, Decatur County, Indiana, Decatur County, Iowa, Decatur County, Kansas, and Decatur County, Tennessee.
- The Borough of Doylestown, Pennsylvania, incorporated a street in his name.
- Decatur Street in Trenton, New Jersey is named in his honor.
- Decatur Avenue in Norman, Oklahoma, is named in honor of Decatur, as is Decatur Avenue in the Bronx, New York, Decatur Boulevard in Las Vegas, Decatur Street in Mineral Point, Decatur Street in Omaha, Wisconsin, Decatur Street, NW, and Decatur Place, NW, in Washington, DC, and Decatur Avenue in Minneapolis, Minnesota.
- Decatur Avenue in Eaton, Ohio, is named after him. Eaton is the county seat of Preble County, named after Edward Preble, Decatur's squadron commander during the Second Battle of Tripoli Harbor.
- Decatur Street is also a street in the New York City borough of Brooklyn, where Henry Miller lived in 1901 (at number 1063).
- Historic Decatur Road in San Diego, CA, runs through Liberty Public Market, near the San Diego Naval Base, honors the historical significance of Decatur's naval career.
- In honor of Stephen Decatur, in the county of Worcester, Maryland, where he was born, a street, monument, park, and middle and high schools are named after him. His birthplace is marked in the current town of Berlin, Maryland.
- Stephen Decatur Elementary School in Seattle and Stephen Decatur Classical School in Chicago is named after him.
- A main thoroughfare in New Orleans' French Quarter is named Decatur in his honor.
- An island in the San Juan Archipelago (Washington state) is named Decatur Island.
- Decatur Township, in Van Buren County, Michigan, and Decatur Township, in Clearfield County, Pennsylvania are named in his honor.
- One of his family's descendants is the operatic soprano Florence Kirk.
- C. D. Howe, American-born Canadian federal cabinet minister, is related to him via Howe's mother Mary Emma Hastings.

== See also ==
- History of the United States Navy
- List of United States Navy people
- List of sailing frigates of the United States Navy

== Bibliography ==
- Abbot, Willis John (1886). The Naval History of the United States. Peter Fenelon Collier, New York.
- Allen, Gardner Weld (1905). Our Navy and the Barbary Corsairs. Houghton Mifflin & Co., Boston, New York & Chicago. p. 354.
- —— (1909). Our Naval War with France. Houghton Mifflin & Co., Boston, New York and Chicago. p. 323. E'book
- Allison, Robert J. (2005). Stephen Decatur American Naval Hero, 1779–1820. University of Massachusetts Press. pp. 253. ISBN 1-55849-492-8. Book Archived May 3, 2016, at the Wayback Machine
- Barnes, James (1906). Yankee ships and Yankee sailors: tales of 1812. Macmillan, London. pp. 281. E'book
- Borneman, Walter R. (2004). 1812: The War that Forged a Nation. New York: Harper Collins. pp. 349. ISBN 0-06-053112-6.Book
- Bradford, James C. (1955). Quarterdeck and Bridge: Two Centuries of American Naval Leaders. Naval Institute Press. p. 263. ISBN 1-55750-073-8. Book Archived May 2, 2016, at the Wayback Machine
- Brady, Cyrus Townsend (1900). Stephen Decatur. Small, Maynard & Company, (original, Harvard Univ.). pp. 142.Book Archived June 17, 2016, at the Wayback Machine, E'book (text)
- —— (2006). Stephen Decatur. Kessinger Publishing (reprint). p. 168. ISBN 1428603115. Book Archived May 2, 2016, at the Wayback Machine
- Canney, Donald L. (2001). Sailing Warships of the US Navy. Chatham Publishing / Naval Institute Press. p. 224. ISBN 1-55750-990-5.Book Archived May 29, 2016, at the Wayback Machine
- Cooper, James Fenimore (1856). History of the Navy of the United States of America. New York: Stringer & Townsend. p. 508. OCLC 197401914.E'book
- —— (1846). Lives of distinguished American naval officers.
  Carey and Hart, Philadelphia. p. 436. OCLC 620356. Book1 Archived June 4, 2016, at the Wayback Machine Book2 Archived November 19, 2015, at the Wayback Machine
- Daughan, George C. Daughan (2011). 1812: The Navy's War. Basic Books. ISBN 978-0-4650-2046-1. Archived from the original on June 27, 2021.
- Guttridge, Leonard F. (2005). Our Country, Right Or Wrong: The Life of Stephen Decatur. New York: Tom Doherty Associates, LLC. p. 304. ISBN 978-0-7653-0702-6. Book Archived September 10, 2015, at the Wayback Machine
- Hagan, Kenneth J. (1992). This People's Navy: The Making of American Sea Power. New York: The Free Press. p. 468. ISBN 0-02-913471-4.Book Archived June 17, 2016, at the Wayback Machine
- Hale, Edward Everett (1896). Illustrious Americans, Their Lives and Great Achievements. International Publishing Company, Philadelphia, PA., and Chicago, ILL. ISBN 978-1-162-22702-3. Book1 Archived April 30, 2016, at the Wayback Machine, Book2 Archived November 19, 2015, at the Wayback Machine
- Harris, Gardner W. (1837). The Life and Services of Commodore William Bainbridge, United States Navy. New York: Carey Lea & Blanchard. pp. 254. E'book
- Hickey, Donald R. (1989). The War of 1812, A Forgotten Conflict. Chicago and Urbana: University of Illinois Press. ISBN 0-252-01613-0. Book
- Hill, Frederic Stanhope (1905). Twenty-six Historic Ships. New York and London: G.P. Putnam's Sons. pp. 515. Book
- Hollis, Ira N. (1900). The Frigate Constitution the Central Figure of the Navy Under Sail. Houghton, Mifflin and Company, Boston and New York; The Riverside Press, Cambridge. p. 455. Book Archived May 15, 2016, at the Wayback Machine
- Lambert, Andrew (2012). The Challenge. Britain against America in the Naval War of 1812. Faber and Faber, London.
- Leiner, Frederic C. (2007). The End of Barbary Terror, America's 1815 War Against the Pirates of North Africa. Oxford University Press. ISBN 978-0-19-532540-9. Book Archived October 19, 2012, at the Wayback Machine
- Lewis, Charles Lee (1924). Famous American Naval Officers. L.C.Page & Company, Inc. p. 444. ISBN 0-8369-2170-4. Book Archived May 4, 2016, at the Wayback Machine
- —— (1937). The Romantic Decatur. Ayer Publishing. p. 296. ISBN 0-8369-5898-5. Book Archived May 9, 2016, at the Wayback Machine
- Library of Congress, Congressional Research Service (2010). Respectfully Quoted: A Dictionary of Quotations. Courier Corporation. ISBN 9780486472881.
- Mackenzie, Alexander Slidell (1846). Life of Stephen Decatur: A Commodore in the Navy of the United States. C. C. Little and J. Brown. pp. 443. Book
- Macdonough, Rodney (1909). Life of Commodore Thomas Macdonough, U.S. Navy. Boston, MA: The Fort Hill Press. p. 303. Book
- Maclay, Edgar Stanton (1894). A History of the United States Navy, from 1775 to 1893. New York: D. Appleton & Company. p. 647. Book
- "Commodore Stephen Decatur and the War on Algiers". Naval History & Heritage, U.S. Naval Institute. May 20, 2010. Archived from the original on March 13, 2012.
- "US Navy Officers: 1798–1900". Naval Historical Center, Washington DC. Archived from the original on September 27, 2013.
- Roosevelt, Theodore (1883). The Naval War of 1812. G.P. Putnam's Sons, New York. p. 541. Book Archived October 21, 2011, at the Wayback Machine
- Seawell, Molly Elliot (1908). Decatur and Somers. D.Appleton and Company, New York. p. 178. Book Archived May 14, 2016, at the Wayback Machine
- Shaler, William; American Consul General at Algiers (1826). Sketches of Algiers. Cummings, Hillard and Company, Boston. pp. 296. Book
- Smith, Charles Henry (1900). Stephen Decatur and the suppression of piracy in the Mediterranean: An address at a meeting of the Connecticut society of the Order of the founders and patriots of America, April 19, A.D. 1900. Tuttle, Morehouse & Taylor, New Haven. p. 38. Book
- Symonds, Craig L.; Clipson, William J. (2001). The Naval Institute Historical Atlas of the U.S. Navy. Naval Institute Press. p. 1101. ISBN 978-1-55750-984-0. Book Archived April 27, 2016, at the Wayback Machine
- Toll, Ian W. (2006). Six Frigates: The Epic History of the Founding of the U.S. Navy. New York: W. W. Norton & Company. pp. 592. ISBN 978-0-393-05847-5. Book Archived July 23, 2016, at the Wayback Machine
- Tucker, Spencer (2004). Stephen Decatur: A Life Most Bold and Daring. Annapolis, MD: Naval Institute Press. p. 245. ISBN 1-55750-999-9.Book Archived April 24, 2016, at the Wayback Machine
- —— (2012). The Encyclopedia Of the War Of 1812.
  ABC-CLIO. p. 1034. Book Archived April 30, 2016, at the Wayback Machine
- Waldo, Samuel Putnam (1821). The Life and Character of Stephen Decatur. P. B. Goodsell, Hartford, Conn. p. 312., E'book
- Whipple, Addison Beecher Colvin (2001). To the Shores of Tripoli: The Birth of the U.S. Navy and Marines. Naval Institute Press. p. 357.Book Archived June 10, 2016, at the Wayback Machine
