= Economic and logistical aspects of the Napoleonic Wars =

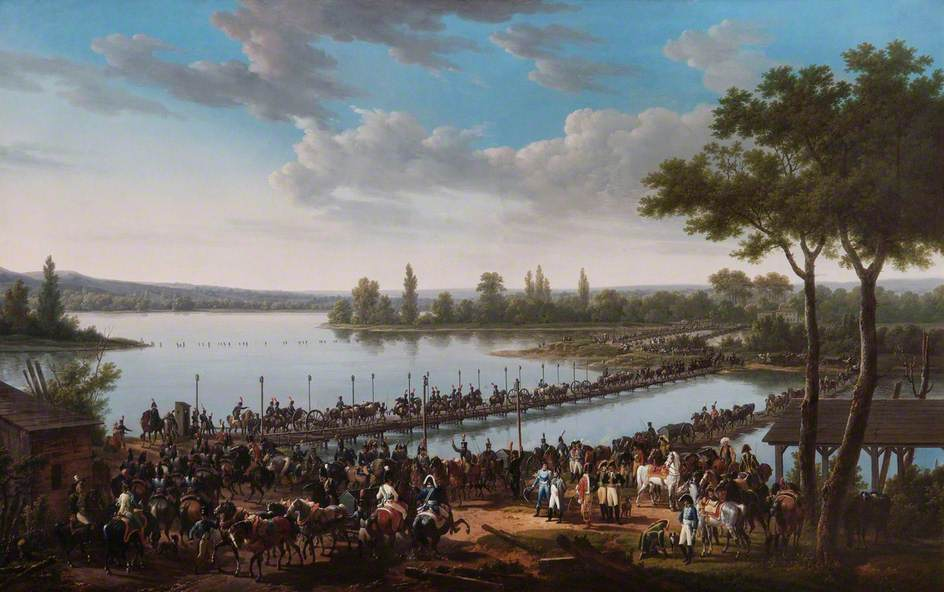
The Napoleonic army on campaign. The Passage of the Danube by Napoleon Before the Battle of Wagram by Jacques Swebach.

The economic and logistical aspects of the Napoleonic Wars describe all the economic factors involved in material management – economic policies, production, etc. – and financial management – funding war expenditures, etc. – of the wars conducted under the Consulate and the First Empire, as well as the economic causes and consequences of these conflicts. They also cover the management and organization of industrial resources for the production of weapons and military equipment, as well as military logistics and attendance for the supply of armies in the field. In any large-scale conflict, managing belligerents' economic and logistical resources for equipping and supplying their armed forces is one of the major aspects of "warfare," just as much as military tactics and strategy in theaters of operations and battlefields, and the Napoleonic wars were no exception.

Napoleon took a personal interest in questions of logistics and "military economics" from the time of the Consulate, and was ably assisted by Pierre Daru, Intendant General of the Grande Armée from 1806 onwards, who later held various key positions in the military administration and stewardship of Napoleon's armies. Both men were responsible for the reform and organization of multiple bodies and services in charge of these logistical and administrative missions, such as the "commissaires-ordonnateurs de guerre", the "inspecteurs aux revues" and the train services.

At the start of the 19th century, with the Industrial Revolution in full swing, France was much less involved in this process than its main adversary, the United Kingdom. It had to rely primarily on crafts and small-scale industry – the factories – to supply its armies with materials and equipment. With the military conquests of the Consulate and Empire added to those of the Revolution (notably Italy and Belgium), almost the whole of Europe found itself involved, willingly or unwillingly, in Napoleon's "war effort" until 1813, including its financing through war indemnities imposed on defeated nations.

On the eve of the Russian campaign of 1812, Napoleon's army numbered some 690,000 French and foreign soldiers. While these numbers were "modest" compared to the millions of men mobilized in the world wars of the 20th century, arming, equipping, and feeding such an armed force represented a considerable economic and logistical effort for the time.

== Napoleon and the war economy ==
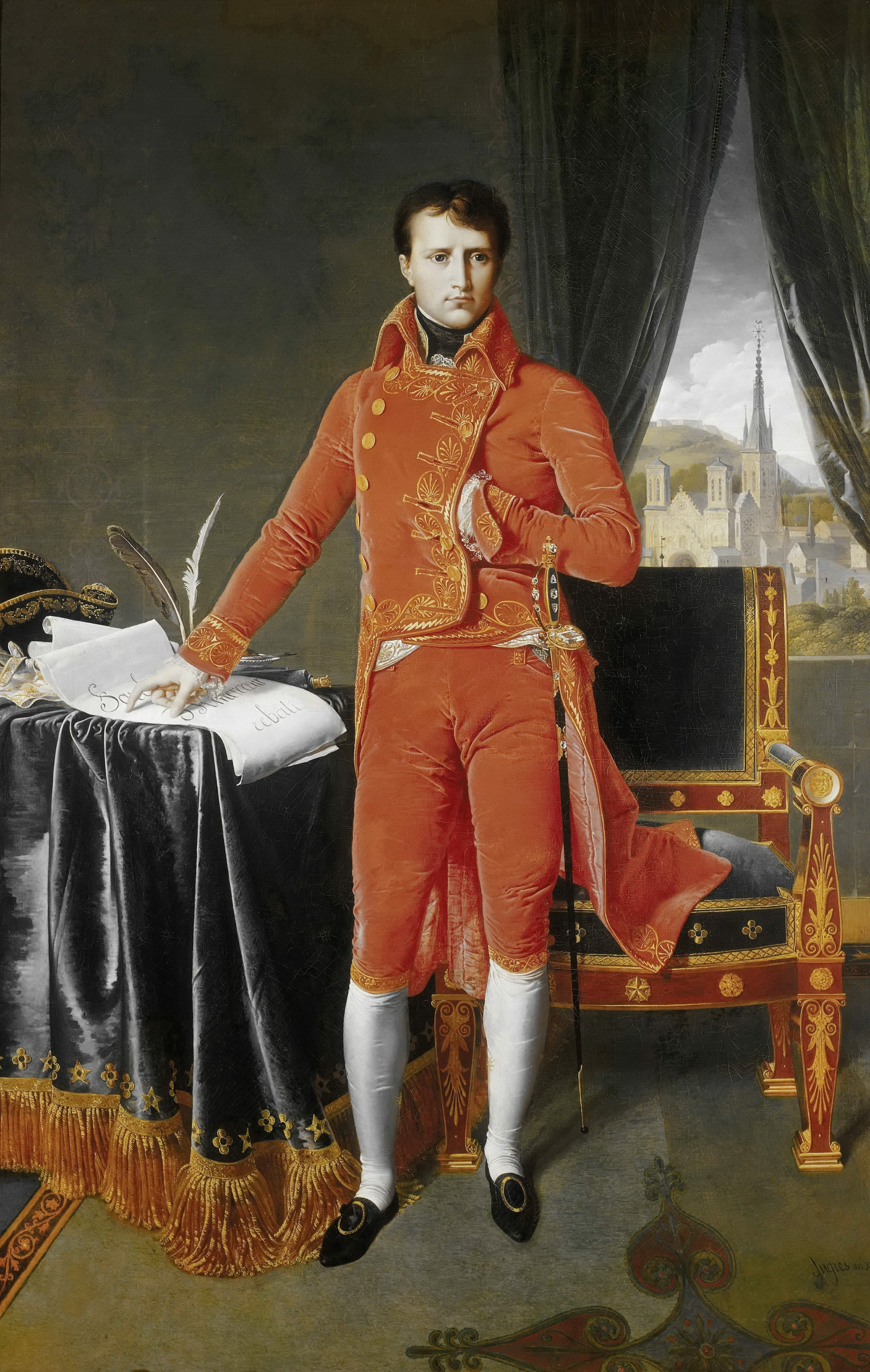
Bonaparte, First Consul, by Jean Auguste Dominique Ingres.

Although a follower of "economic dirigisme", which his Treasury Minister Nicolas François Mollien disapproved of, Napoleon interfered very little in military "industrial" production, leaving it to his trusted minister Pierre Daru, whom he praised during his exile on St. Helena. This does not mean, however, that he ignored the economic and logistical aspects of his military campaigns, as well as the problems of quartermastery. With the advent of the Consulate, Bonaparte marked the start of the post-revolutionary era with a general overhaul of the armaments system, as the sometimes more or less improvised production of the 1790s had not always been satisfactory, and firearms offered too many calibers (particularly in the artillery). Many weapons were replaced or modified in Year IX (1800).

In his biography of his father Auguste, Napoleon-Joseph de Colbert emphasizes Napoleon's attention to detail and the "superhuman foresight" (sic) with which he prepared his operations: "At every moment, he had present the situation of each of his army corps, of the regiments that made them up, the state of their armament, their equipment, their clothing, what was in the stores of shoes, capotes, etc [. ...] Eager for all the information that would enlighten him on the real state and strength of his troops, he wrote one day to Prince Eugène, who had given him some fine phrases in a report: 'Send me well-done statements of the situation; know that no reading is more agreeable to me'".

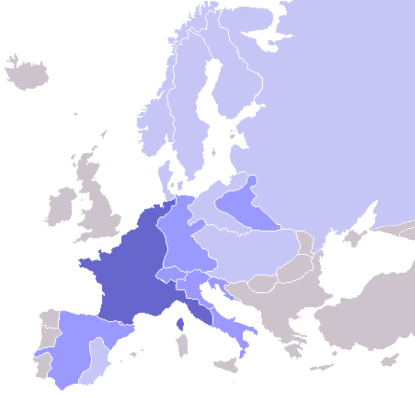
European nations involved in the Continental System in 1811

Numerous questions or instructions relating to these aspects of military operations can still be found in his voluminous correspondence, published later in the century by order of Napoleon III, and numerous imperial decrees also attest to this concern for military commissariat issues. In March 1806, for example, an imperial decree was issued on army subsistence (see below) and the organization of their distribution. In April 1815, on the eve of the Belgian campaign, the Emperor gave his Minister of War Louis Nicolas Davout various orders concerning, in particular, the manufacture of weapons and the establishment of armament depots and stores.

The importance of economic and financial factors as part of a global military strategy was not lost on Napoleon either, inspiring him to set up the "continental economic system" in 1806, and in particular the economic blockade against Britain, the main financial backer of the coalitions he had to face from the time of the Consulate within the framework of the Second Coalition (1798–1802). However, unlike his rival, he was unable to rely on a colonial empire to support his war effort, the only profit he was able to make from the "French colonial space" of the time being the fruit of the sale of Louisiana to the United States on April 30, 1803, for the sum of 80 million francs. (Note: Prices and figures in this article are given in Germinal Francs. The conversion rate to Euro of a Germinal Franc from the Napoleonic era is 3.40 euros, see Le pouvoir d'achat sous le Consulat et L'Empire)

== Military industry in the early 19th century ==
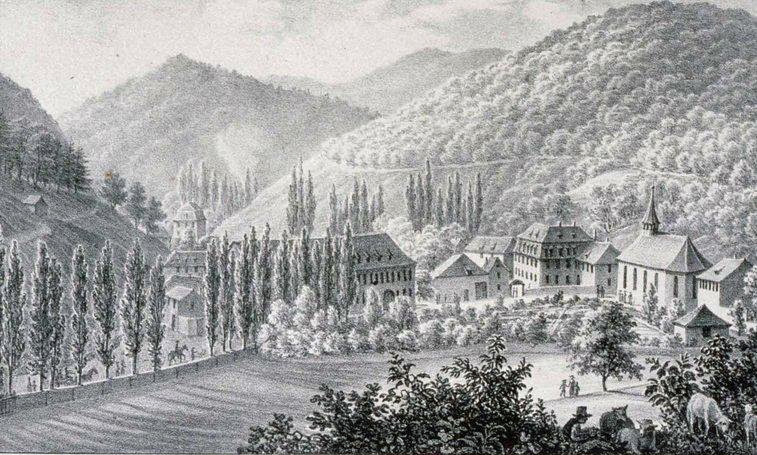
The Klingenthal arms factory in 1830. The French arms industry hardly evolved significantly under the First Empire, despite the enormous need for weapons by the Napoleonic armies, with spoils of war supplementing national production in quantity.

At the turn of the eighteenth and nineteenth centuries, the French metallurgical industry "was a low-production, low-yield industry, with very routine processes. With rare exceptions, production was highly fragmented, with a large number of factories specializing in a particular type of manufacture or transformation. In short, industry retains the structure and form of small-scale, home-based industry or scattered factories".

With the advent of the Empire, the "Manufactures nationales d'armes" – for the most part former "Manufactures royales" – became the "Manufactures d'armes impériales" with, for edged weapons, the famous Manufacture de Klingenthal, which reached its apogee under the Empire, employing over 600 workers, and for firearms, the Imperial Manufactory of Versailles, which also produced ceremonial bladed weapons, the Saint-Étienne Arms Manufactory, and the manufactories of Charleville, Tulle, Maubeuge, Mutzig, Roanne, Culemborg, Liège and later Châtellerault. Artillery pieces were cast at the Douai cannon foundry, at Le Creusot, at the Indret foundry, and at the Liège cannon foundry established by the First Consul in 1803.

=== Individual firearms ===
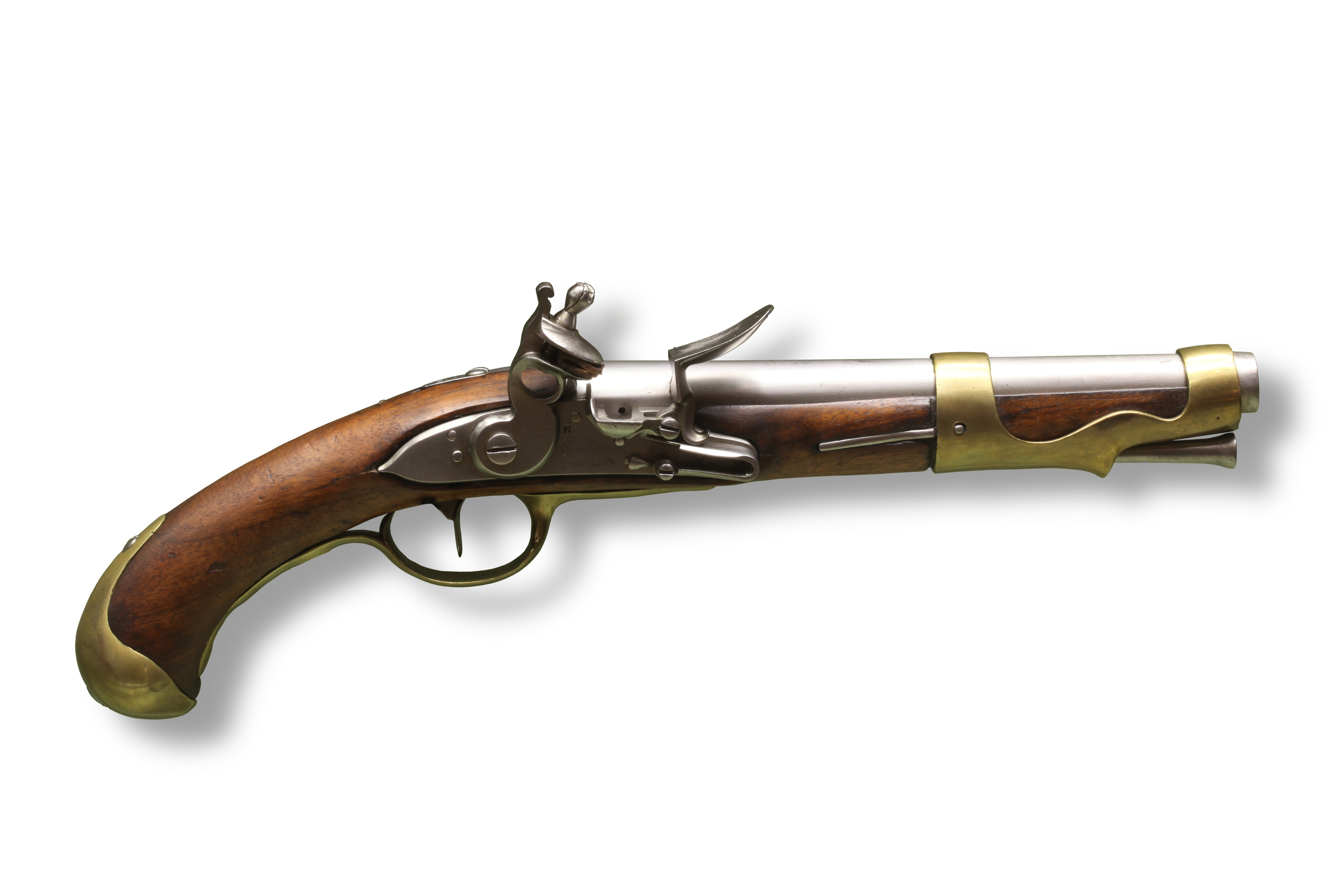
Cavalry pistol, model 1766, manufactured around 1800–1810 by the Charleville factory.

At the beginning of the 19th century, France had not yet fully embraced the industrial revolution that had already begun in Britain, and "the industrial landscape was still marked more by small workshops than by factories": for example, the Manufacture d'armes de Charleville was made up of various workshops scattered across the Charleville region, various villages in the Meuse valley and at the bottom of the Goutelle valley. In the Liège armory, one of the most renowned and important of its time, which became part of the French war effort following the second French annexation of the States of Belgium, "there were practically no gunsmiths as such, but rather workers who carried out repetitive tasks at home in small workshops, often a single room equipped with a bay window, each producing a specific part from dawn to dusk". Weapons manufacture was organized in a cascade of subcontractors who "began with the manufacturer (who made nothing) but took an order from a prince or a country. He entrusted the manufacture of the barrels to the "fèvres" (blacksmiths), who welded the barrels and subcontracted them to the grinders, then to the drillers, to the test bench, and finally to the burnishers, before delivering them to the garnisseurs. Trimmers also subcontracted the production of various components to woodworkers and to platonists for the firing mechanism, who in turn subcontracted each part to file makers... We worked "by eye", i.e. by copying a model entrusted by the "manufacturer", most often following a request from a gunsmith or foreign manufacturer, without caliber or standard. The first (relative) standardization came with the French request to manufacture the 1777 model, which imposed an acceptance standard. This marked a technological threshold for a large part of the gun-making industry".

=== Artillery ===
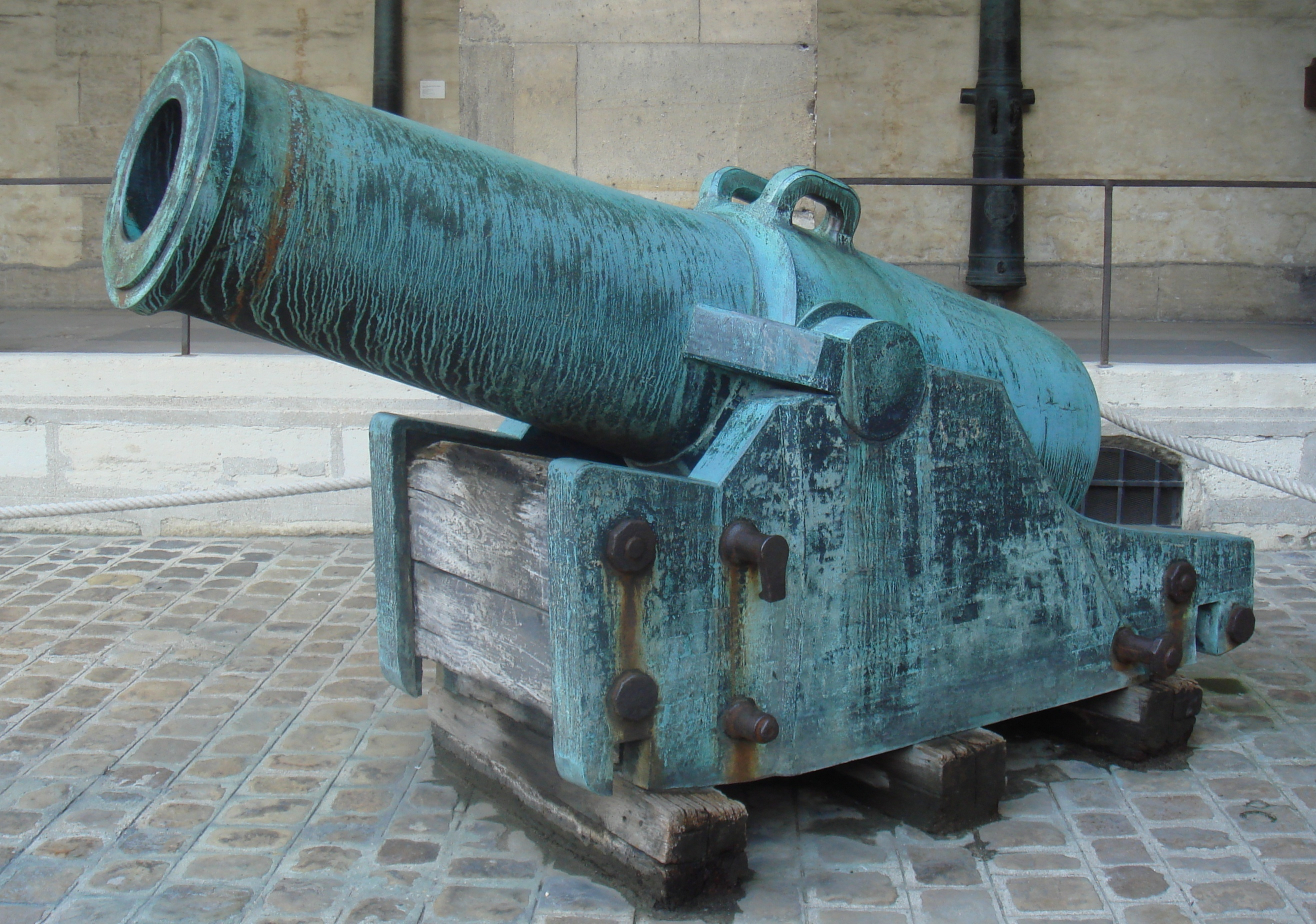
11-inch howitzer System An XI (1810).

Since the late 1770s, French artillery has been organized according to the system established by Jean-Baptiste Vaquette de Gribeauval. In addition to its strictly military advantages, the "Gribeauval system" also enabled a degree of standardization in the manufacture of artillery pieces, resulting in greater quantity and quality. The system also ensured standardization of calibers, enabling production and supply to be rationalized. "This equipment was available when war broke out in 1792, but it soon proved insufficient, and, notwithstanding the somewhat irregular activity of factories, foundries, and improvised arsenals throughout the country, the French armies depended on the enemy for their supplies". In 1803, following studies carried out by the "Artillery Committee" he had set up on December 29, 1801, chaired by General François Marie d'Aboville, Napoleon decided to simplify the Gribeauval system by further limiting the number of calibers used.

In 1794, Gaspard Monge published a "Description of the art of making cannons: made in execution of the decree of the Committee of Public Safety, of 18 Pluviôse of the year II of the French Republic, one and indivisible". In this technical work, the author describes in great detail the manufacture of artillery pieces during the Napoleonic wars, from the melting of the metals used in their manufacture – iron for naval artillery and the lighter bronze for army cannons – to the proof bench before the pieces are received, via the manufacture of powders, from the washing of saltpeter earth to extract the salt that forms the basis of black powder. As with the individual guns, the parts are made from a brass model supplied to the manufacturer. "The work of the gun foundries consists mainly in 1°. Making the molds; 2°. Operating the furnaces and pouring the parts; 3°. drilling; 4°. piercing the light and repairing imperfections in the casting; 5°. and finally, carrying out inspections and tests to ensure the goodness of the parts.

Two types of molds were used to cast the pieces. The oldest and most time-consuming system is that of the clay mold, which requires the manufacture of a "master" centered on a wooden rod, around which the shape of the tube is fashioned in hay and clay, and which is of one-time use since it must be destroyed before the metal is cast. The other, more modern and productive, is the sand mold, using a removable and reusable assembly of individual parts for the master. Attachments, such as handles for land parts or the breech knob (the ball at the rear of the barrel), are screwed onto barrel molds. The parts are then cast "solid", and the tubes are drilled, the barrel rotating around a fixed drill, a more precise system perfected by Swiss mechanic Jean Maritz, ensuring that the core of the part is perfectly centered and reamed, the bronze filings being immediately reloaded into the furnace, while the iron filings must be remelted. Next comes the drilling of the "lumen", through which the powder charge is ignited. The parts are then inspected and put through the "proof bench" to test their resistance to gunpowder before being delivered.

Description of the art of making cannons
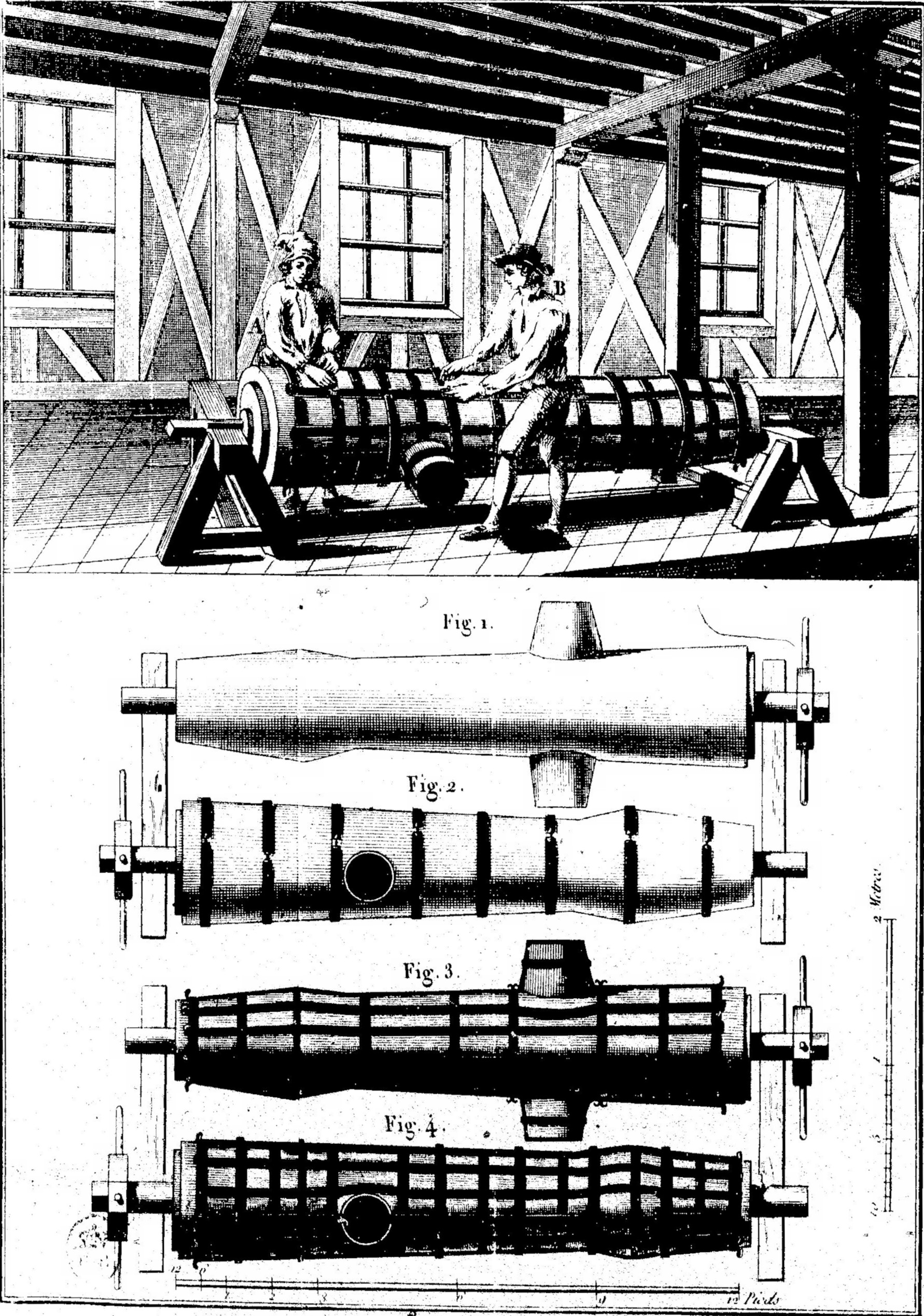
Making the master model.

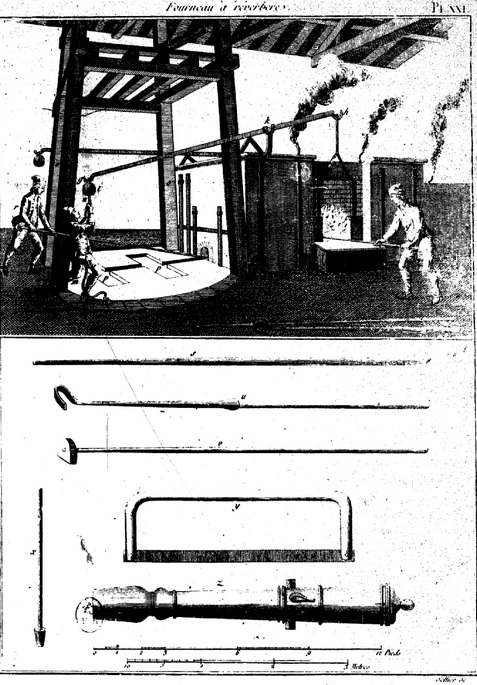
"Reverberatory" furnace. Below, a "full" barrel before drilling.

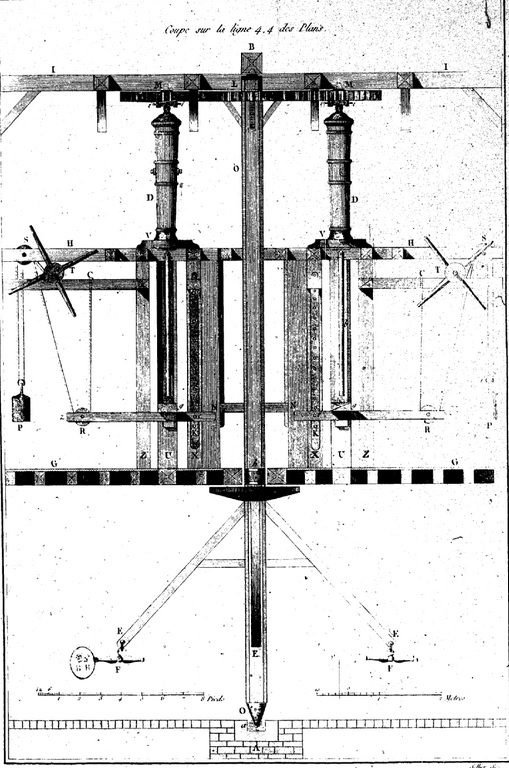
Drilling the barrels.

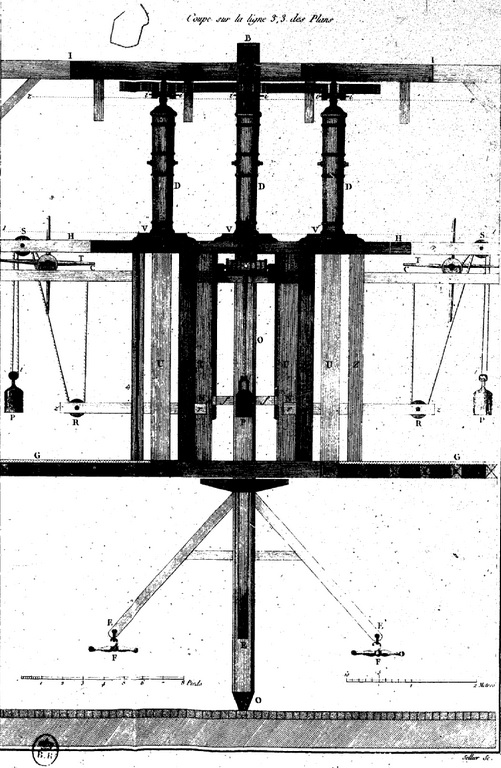
Drilling the barrels.

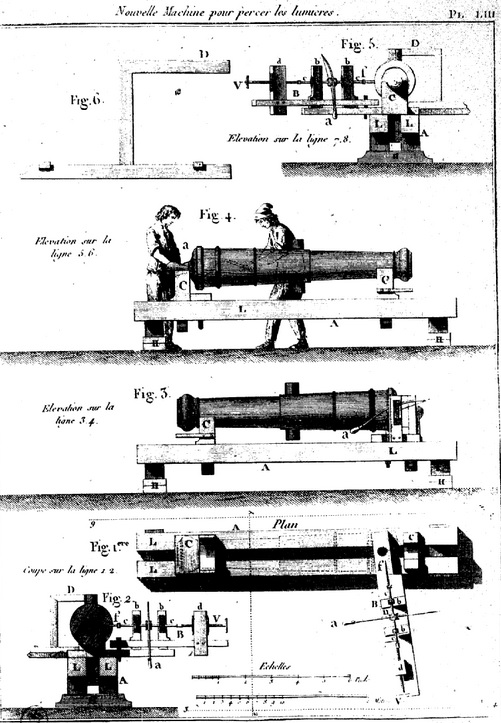
Light drilling machine.

=== Edged weapons and ceremonial weapons ===
The greatest disorder reigned about bladed weapons during the Revolution. Napoleon Bonaparte, then Consul, decided not only to reorganize manufacturing but also to establish a model saber for his cavalry. The An IX saber appears to be directly inspired by the saber that equipped the Gardes du Corps and Grenadiers à Cheval of the King's Household in 1786. This is borne out by the model proposed by the Paris manufacturer Liorard (a Parisian craftsman and major producer of bladed weapons during the Revolution) to the Commission des armes de l'An VIII (a commission organized on the initiative of General Gassendi, then Head of the Artillery Division at the Ministry of War), which was accepted by the Commissions of An IX [...] 15,199 units were produced.

— Historic site of the 7th cuirassiers, Les sabres de cuirassiers

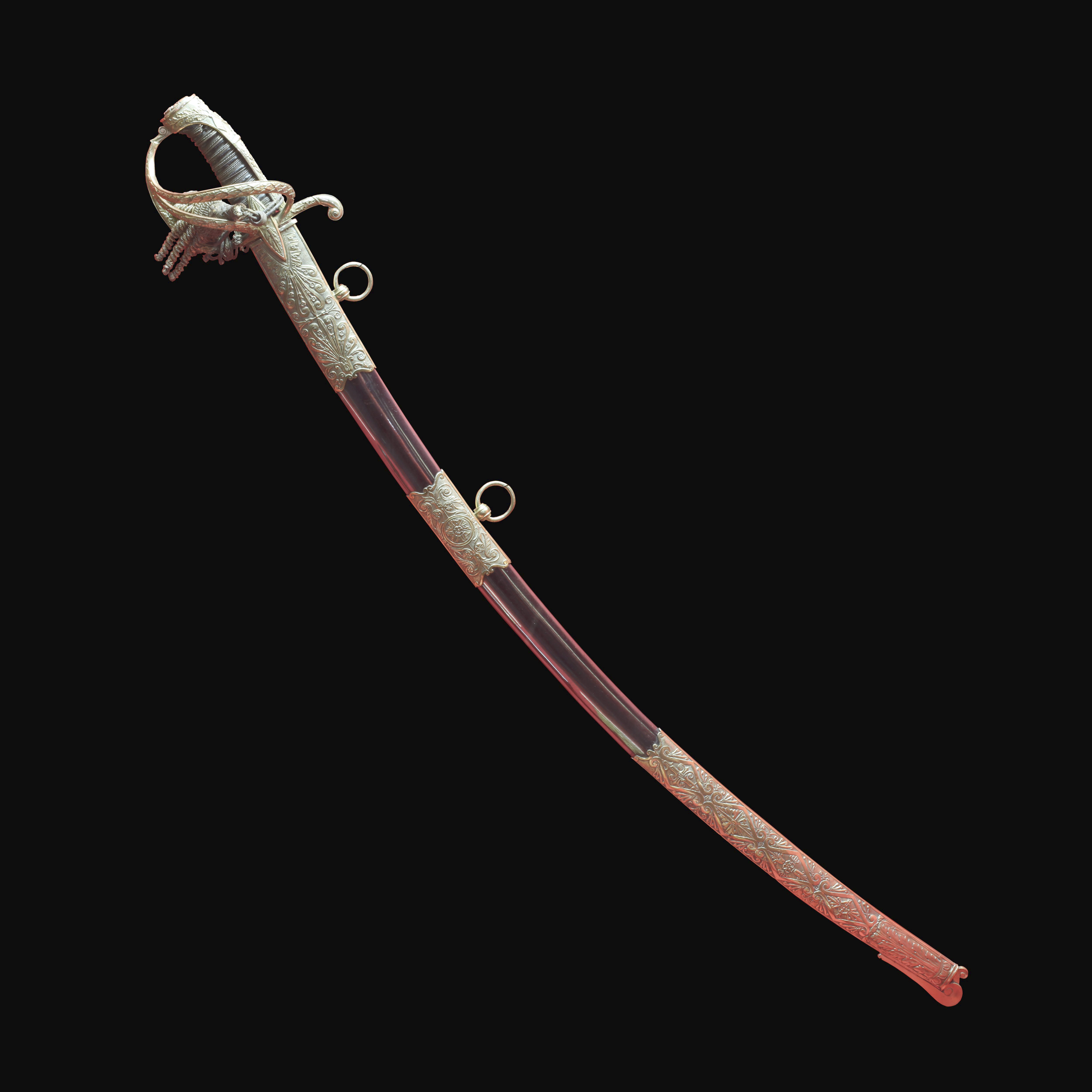
Ceremonial saber of a hussar officer.

Established in 1730 by order of Louis XV, the bladed weapons factory in Klingenthal, Alsace, was the main supplier of this type of weapon to the French armies during the Revolution and Empire: during the imperial era, the "village-manufacture" boasted no fewer than forty forges. The brothers Jacques and Julien Coulaux were the directors. In 1803, Julien Coulaux took over administration on behalf of his brother, who founded the Mutzig firearms factory. In 1804, the Klingenthal factory became the "Manufacture Impériale d'armes blanches".

The first arms workshop was set up in Versailles on October 7, 1793, and became the Manufacture d'Armes de Versailles on February 1, 1794. On November 19, 1798, Nicolas-Noël Boutet was appointed by the Directoire as "Directeur Général des Manufactures d'armes et Ateliers des réparations de France" (Director General of the Manufactures of Arms and Repair Workshops of France). During the imperial era, "the Manufacture Impériale de Versailles, which originally produced weapons of war, specialized in the production of luxury weapons, intended above all as rewards for distinguished officers", and in particular ceremonial sabers. "The latter were machined with such precision in their decoration, chasing, gold plating, and historical references that they became masterpieces. Nicolas-Noël Boutet called on the services of master goldsmiths to create pieces of immense elegance, so meticulously finished. Emperor Napoleon 1st, attached to his armies, honored the work of this Manufacture.

=== Military effects and supplies ===
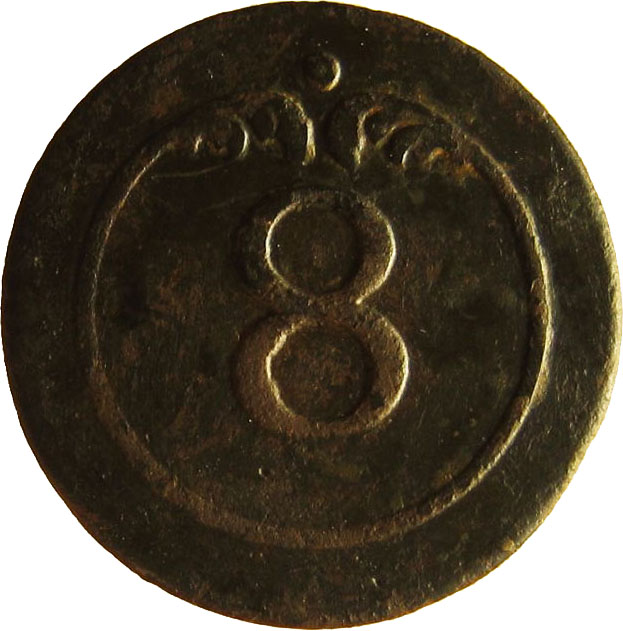
Uniform button of the 8th line regiment.

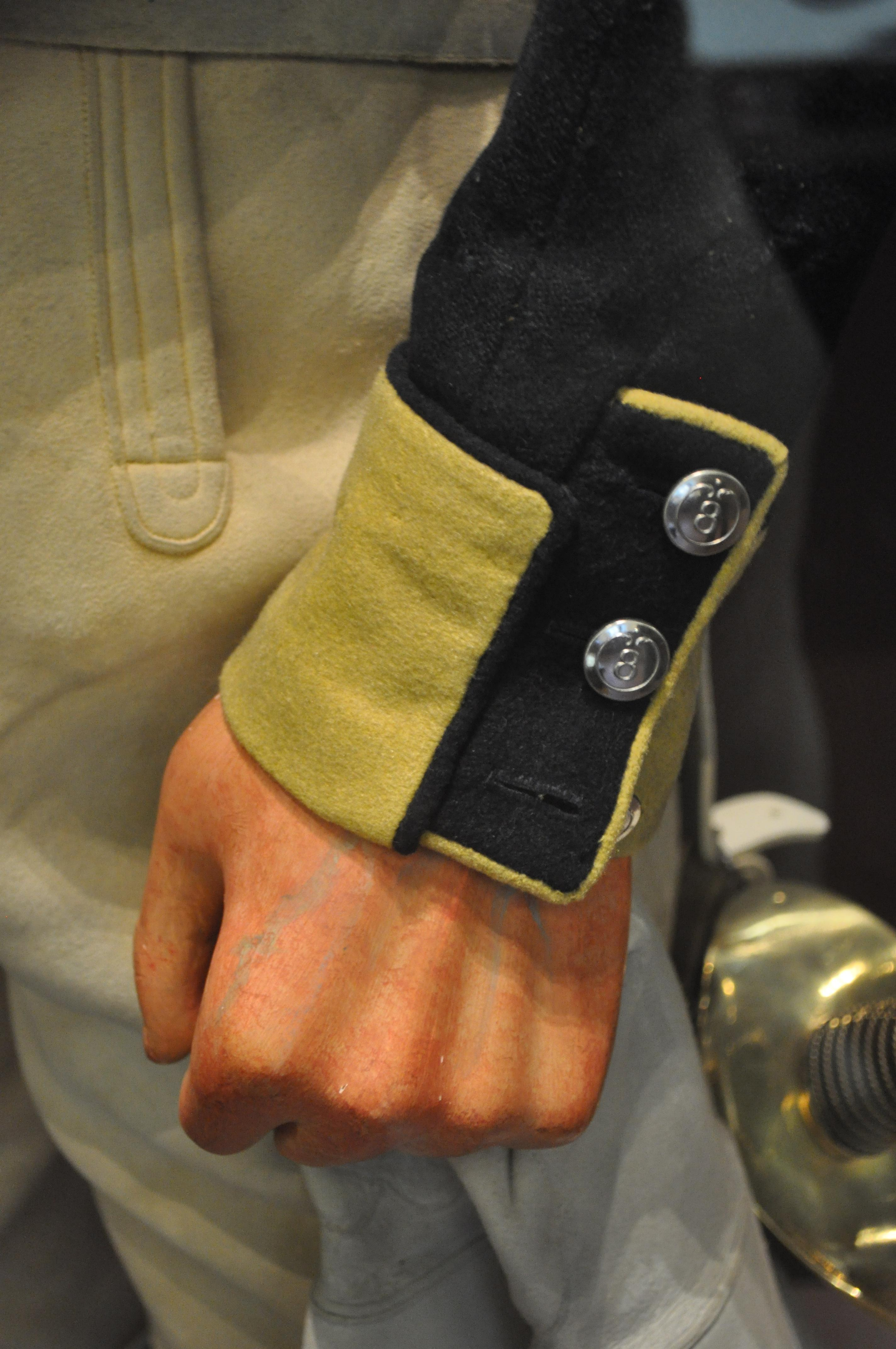
Detail of the sleeve facings, buttons and trimmings of a uniform of the 8th Cuirassier Regiment.

The history of the Puy-de-Dôme departmental reserve company, studied by local historian Fabien Pacaud, provides an insight into how the supply of military effects to armies functioned. "On 3 Thermidor An XIII (July 22, 1805), the Prefect received instructions from the Minister of War concerning the equipment to be supplied to the men. He entrusted this mission to an old retired military officer from Clermont-Ferrand, Captain Lallemand, who contacted companies throughout the Empire capable of supplying him with the necessary equipment for the company. The need for military equipment on the part of the Prefectures, who were responsible for setting up these reserve and depot units, "was a boon to mail-order salesmen, who offered their products by leaving brochures in the mail, or perhaps by a traveling salesman. Throughout its existence, the company's need for new equipment meant that it was constantly the subject of such advertising. For example, it received offers by printed mail from Janillion et Cie, based on rue Saint-Honoré in Paris, for the supply of all equipment for the horses of officers of all arms and the gendarmerie, as well as for the clothing and equipment of departmental reserve companies. It also receives an offer for all military equipment from the factory of Pierre Sébastien Perrelle, rue de la Coutellerie, N°10, in Paris [...] for all large equipment the company cannot find local manufacturers and must call on those in Paris, so a certain David de Paris supplies 115 gibernes with their giberne holders, as many rifle straps, 16 shoulder harnesses, two drum collars, one with a plate, a haversack, a lined linen collar and a patent leather cockade. Another Parisian merchant, Bellanger Boisselier, supplied the drums and the bookshop: two copper cases mounted in calfskin, with their sticks, twelve theory books in two volumes, two accounting books, and three books of service regulations".

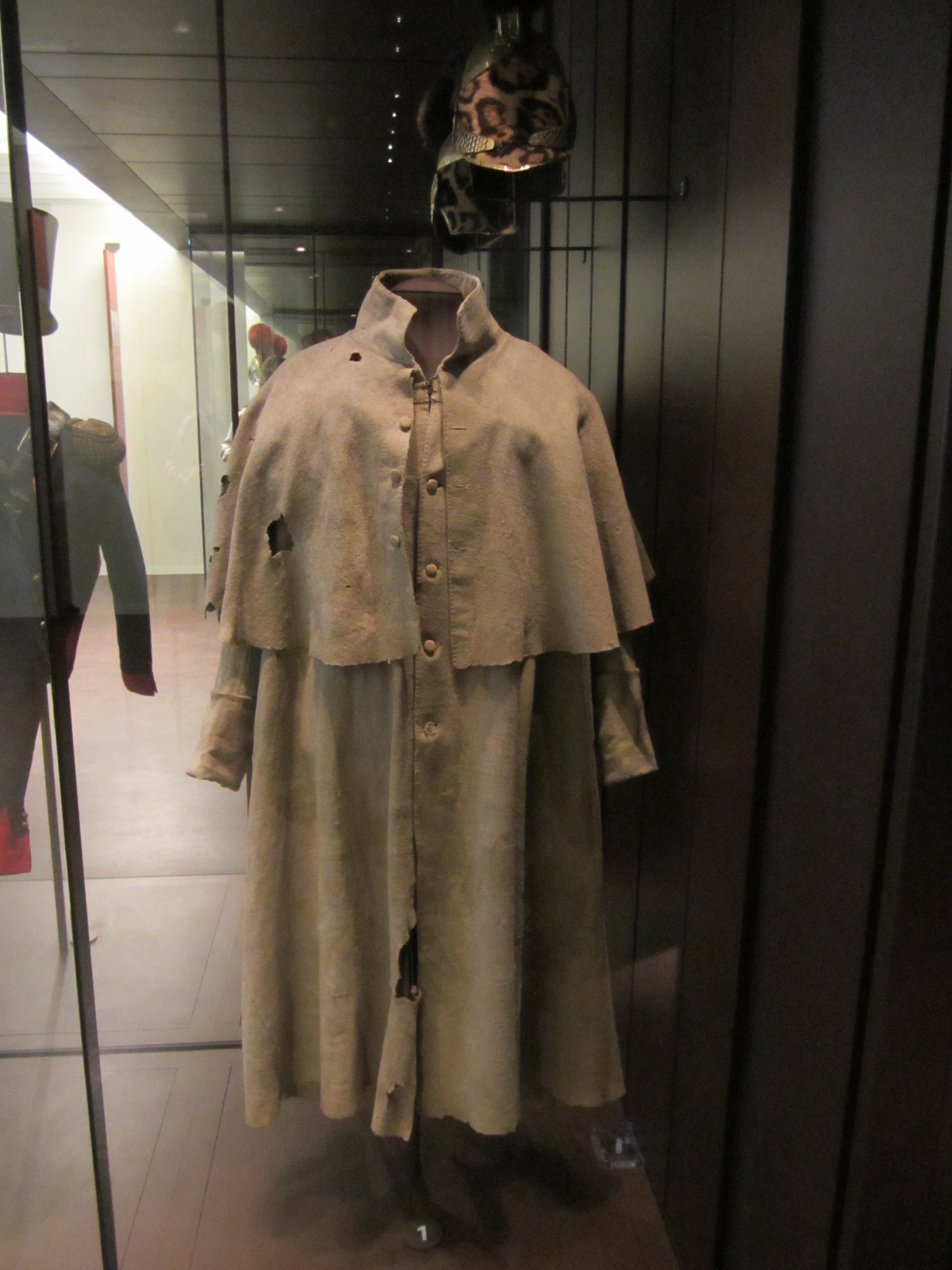
Cavalry "rotunda coat" and dragoon helmet.

Regarding the small equipment, Pacaud explains:

"Small equipment is much more available in the Auvergne capital. Buttons, staples, buckles, shoes, woolen stockings, gaiters, black collars, canvas bags, and shirts are all apparently supplied by Clermont businesses [...] The multiplicity of contracts underlines the presence in Clermont of an abundance of small craftsmen. To support economic activity in his department, and perhaps also to reduce shipping costs, the Préfet (assisted by Captain Lallemand) left most of the market to Clermont craftsmen. As a result, many orders were placed: sheets (sky blue, aurora, white...) canvas aunes, knitwear, braids, underpants canvas for non-commissioned officers, full suits, hats, aurora pompoms, police caps, gaiters, buttons of all kinds [...] In other words, supplies for the new company were a major contract, and for these various textile items alone, the Prefecture paid out 10,879.68 francs. These sums were, so to speak, reinvested in the company and local commerce.

=== Uniforms ===
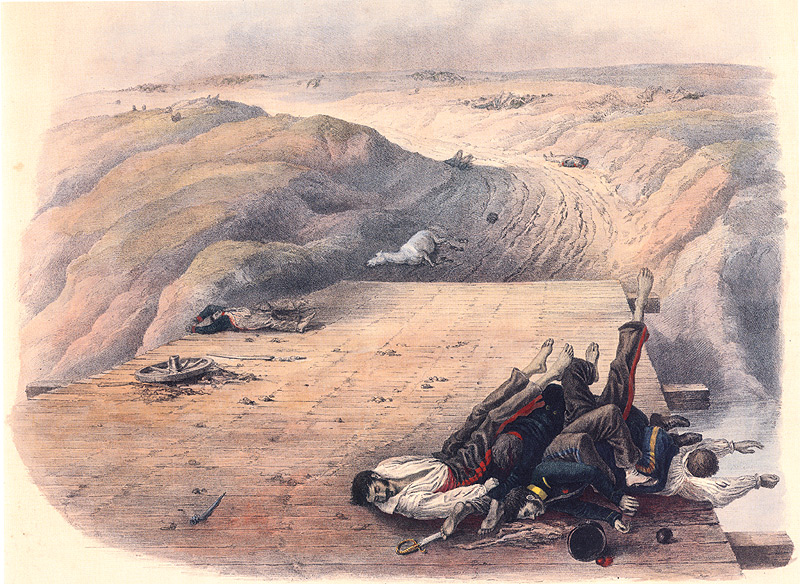
Bodies of soldiers of the Grande Armée stripped of their equipment. "Necessity being the law", the soldiers did not hesitate to recover weapons and equipment from corpses and prisoners to replace worn, damaged or missing equipment.

Because of the practical problems involved in implementing this measure, "Napoleon, in October 1811, again authorized regimental boards of directors to award contracts, limiting them to the manufacture of 200 uniforms, with the remainder to be supplied by the state stores". Cloth, fabrics, and trimmings are supplied to the regimental stores. "There, they are used or sent to the war battalions or squadrons in the small depot where the regiment's board of directors is located [...] Upon receipt of these textiles, traveling in marked bales, a member of the regiment's board of directors, the sub-inspector of reviews and the local commissioner of wars check the quality of the cloth [...]. With the blockade and ever-increasing supplies, the quality of the fabrics used tends to be increasingly mediocre, with manufacturers pulling fabric to increase production". This situation is increasingly leading to disputes: "Textiles are generally rejected because they don't match the samples sent. They are of poor quality: badly dyed and weak for uniforms".

"After the raw materials have been accepted by the regiments, the regimental workers go to work [...] The garments are made according to patterns and models supplied by the central administration [...] in three sizes: small, medium, and large. They can be readjusted at the colonel's request. For non-commissioned officers, clothes are made to measure by the regimental tailors, using finer, higher-quality cloth".

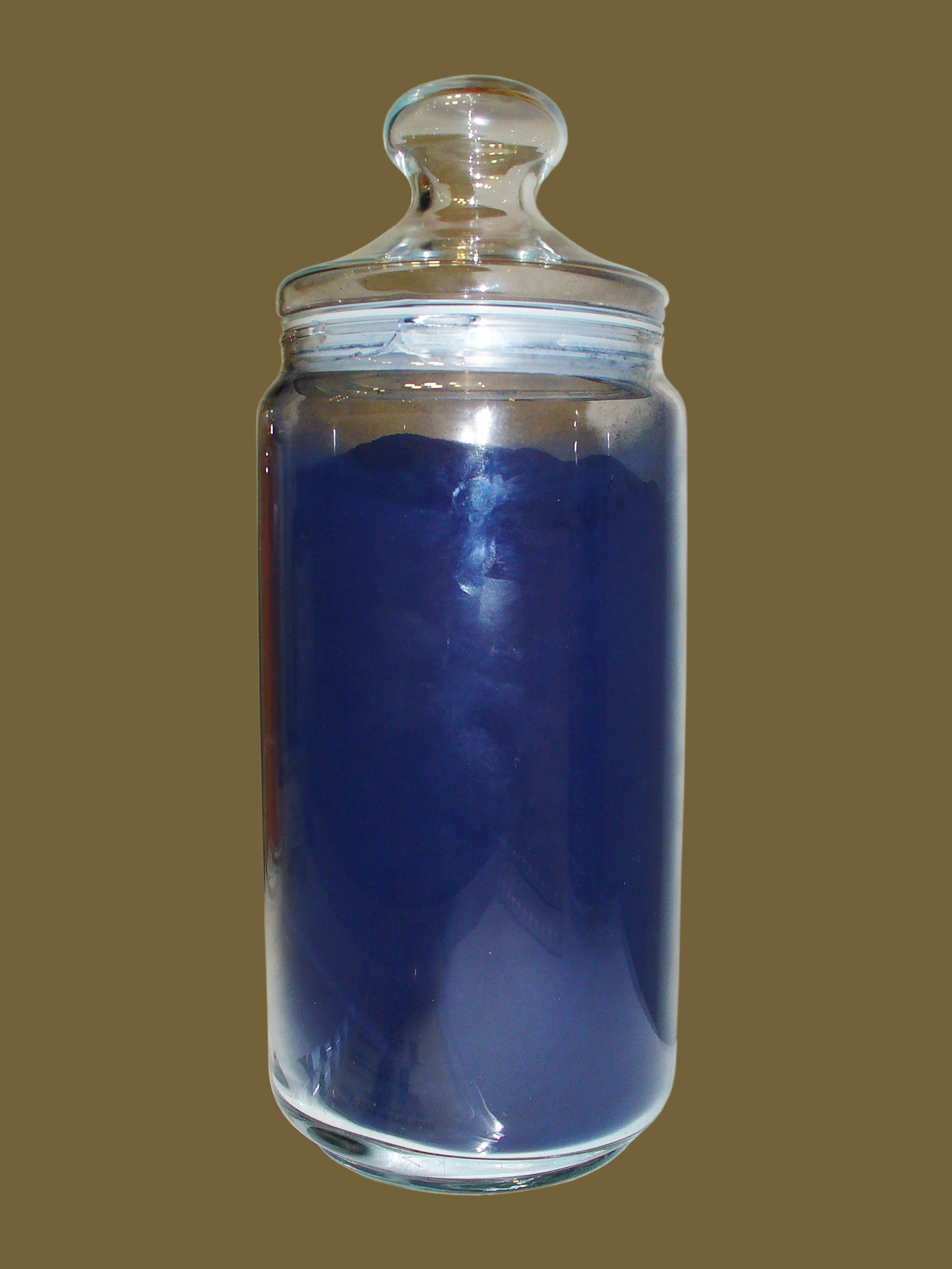
Blue dye from Isatis tinctoria, the "dyers' woad" which will replace indigo in the dyeing of French army uniforms.

Alongside items made by specialized regimental workers and by civilian tailors on orders from regimental boards of directors, "some production comes out of state workshops or at least military depots. This is the case for shirts, the production of which is generated by the Inspector General of Clothing, and for shoes [...] With the supply of state-made uniforms, the boards of directors see their quality requirements greatly reduced [...] However, when a regiment has no tailors or receives no state uniforms, the colonel or major can call on the know-how of civilian tailors to make uniforms. This is what happened, in 1811, to the men of the 126th regiment of line infantry [...] While in garrison, the regiment's board of directors was responsible for the soldiers' clothing and equipment, in the field, even if the regiments were equipped with master tailors and master bootmakers, soldiers very often had to replace damaged effects or missing items themselves, with supplies often sourced locally" or taken from the enemy. In his memoirs, Captain Godet reports that, after the Battle of Ulm, French soldiers, lacking coats, stripped their Austrian prisoners of their capotes.

In 1806, following a shortage of indigo dye, the French army was issued a white uniform by decree. "French industrialists having discovered an "ersatz" for indigo in a native plant: woad, the decree was repealed in 1807. In October 1810, Napoleon sent Eugène de Beauharnais, Viceroy of Italy, his "encouragement" for the production of woad to replace indigo in Rieti. (Note: Guado has been cultivated in Italy since Roman times, see Guarino, Carmine; Casoria, Paolo; Menale, Bruno (2000). "Cultivation and use of isatis tinctoria L. (Brassicaceae) in Southern Italy". Economic Botany. 54 (3): 395–400. Bibcode:2000EcBot..54..395G. doi:10.1007/BF02864789.)

== Financial aspects ==
As Michael D. Bordo and Eugene N. White pointed out in their study of British and French financing during the Napoleonic Wars:

the Napoleonic Wars offer a unique experience in the history of wartime finance. While Britain was forced to abandon monometallism and endured sustained inflation, France retained its bimetallic system for the duration of the war. The financing of the Napoleonic Wars stands out among conflicts of comparable duration and intensity in the 19th and 20th centuries.

They further argued that:

[...] these contrasting regimes of war financing were the consequence of each nation's "credibility" as a debtor [...] Given its long experience of fiscal probity, coupled with procedures of budgetary control by Parliament, Britain was able to continue to finance a substantial fraction of its war expenditure by borrowing, interest rates being relatively low. The British tax rate hardly varied throughout most of the 18th century, and peacetime surpluses were able to offset wartime deficits to ensure repayment of accumulated debts [...] France, for its part, had ruined its reputation in the last decade of the Ancien Régime and under the Revolution.

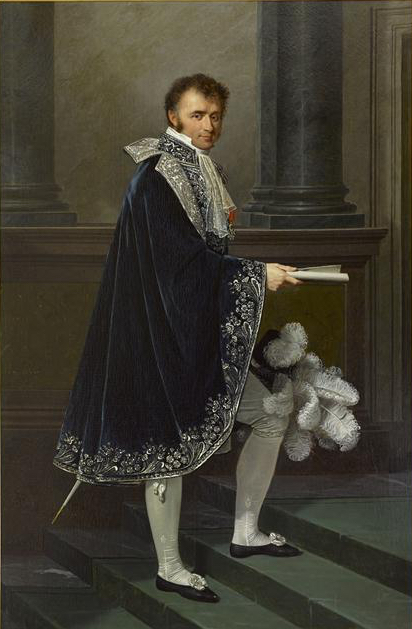
Nicolas François Mollien, Minister of the Public Treasury (Finances) from 1806 to 1814, who had the difficult task of financing the Emperor's wars.

This situation meant that the country was dependent on taxation to finance its public spending, while recourse to borrowing remained highly problematic due to public mistrust following the disastrous financial experiences of the revolutionary period (two-thirds bankruptcy). All public revenues were called upon to finance the war effort. In his aforementioned study, Pacaud notes, referring to the "challenge" posed to the prefect by the raising of the Auvergne reserve company:

This administrator [...] is enjoined to finance expenditure from one-twentieth of all the revenues of the communes in the department, which, proving insufficient for the majority of them (only fourteen make do with this one-twentieth) can be supplemented by the centime additional, i.e. one-hundredth of the land tax and the personal, sumptuary and movable contribution imposed on the department. Despite a departmental population of 508,000, the prefect of Puy-de-Dôme had only 9,900 francs to draw from the vingtième, making him the poorest of those required to raise a 3rd class company. Maintaining a 3rd class company would theoretically cost 32,479.50 francs a year. Recourse to the centime additional was therefore essential, providing the Puy-de-Dôme prefecture with a not inconsiderable windfall of 28,500 francs (for An XIV). With this sum, i.e. 38,400 francs, the prefect had to prepare everything the company would need, so that the soldiers of 1er Vendémiaire could be housed, clothed, armed, and fed.

In overall terms, from 1810 onwards, military budgets grew steadily. In 1810, they totaled 503 million francs. The 1811 budget included 460,000,000 francs for army expenditure, which eventually rose to 506,096,000 francs. These army and navy expenditures absorbed 60% of the state budget of 954,000,000 francs – finally closed at 1,103,367,000. It was from this year onwards that the budget deficit began to appear, and it proved increasingly difficult to make up. In 1812, military expenditure was estimated at 710 million, rising to 817 million in 1813. The year 1814 saw an estimated deficit of 579,000,000 francs. At the start of the Hundred Days, the War Ministry's debt was still 247,380,000 francs in arrears. If Napoleon believed that, thanks to wars, he could constantly balance his budgets according to the adage "war feeds war", Mollien, in his voluminous "Memoirs", notes that "not a single one of the Empire's most glorious campaigns has cost him more than the contributions that punished Germany for its impudent attacks ".

== Military administration ==
On 17 Ventôse, Year X (March 8, 1802), an administrative reorganization transferred the management of military supply and logistics from the War Minister's authority to a newly created Ministry of War Administration. This new ministry was supported by a General Intendant of the Grande Armée and a Director General of Inspections and Conscription, both overseeing "war commissioners" and "inspection officers." "These two groups comprised 436 ranked officials tasked with the demanding responsibility of managing Napoleon's army." Various reforms and reorganizations followed under the Consulate and Empire, reflecting Napoleon's intent to prevent the mismanagement – waste, corruption, incompetence, and abuses of power – that had plagued the Revolutionary period by clearly separating administrative, financial, and logistical duties.

=== Pierre Daru, General Intendant of Armies and Military Administrator ===
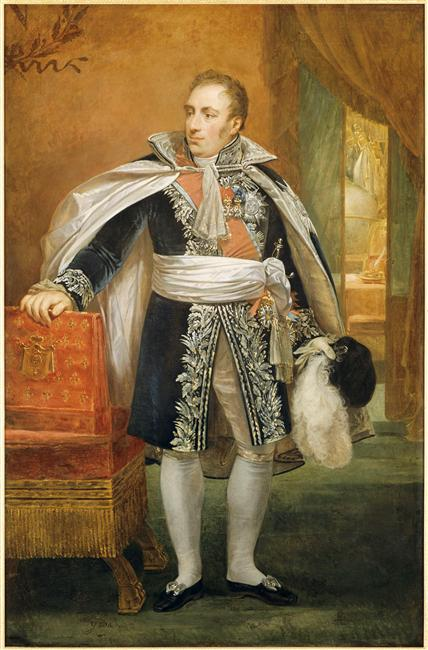
Pierre Antoine Noël Mathieu Bruno, Count Daru after Antoine-Jean Gros.

Pierre Daru began his career in military administration and logistics on April 10, 1784, at the age of 17, as a "provincial war commissioner." He continued to serve in these roles under the Second Restoration, contributing to the reorganization of the military intendant corps during peacetime in 1816.

=== War Commissioners-Administrators ===
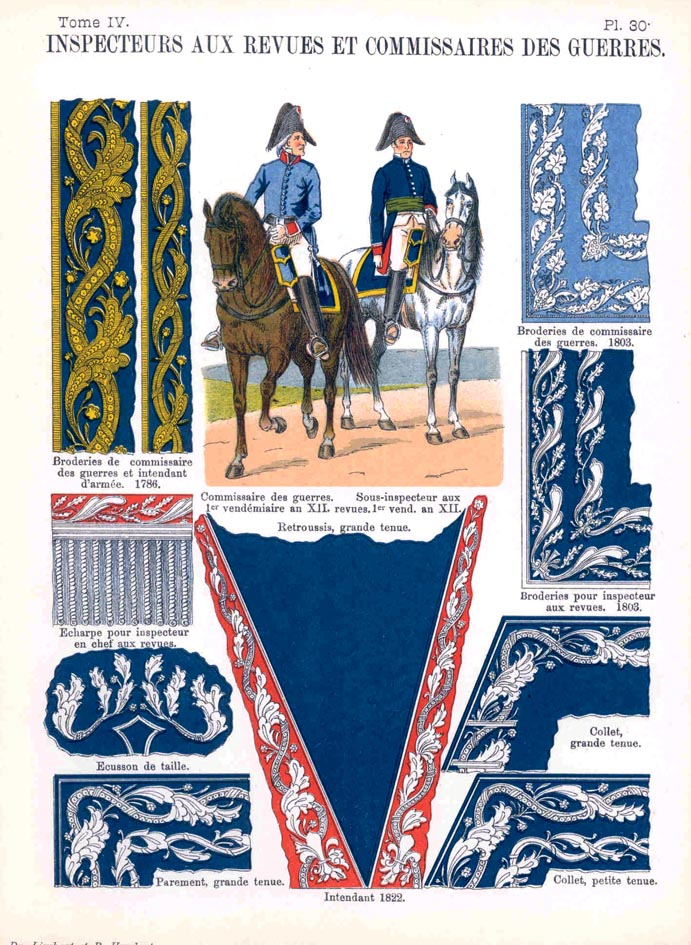
Inspector of reviews and war commissioner, 1803. Plate from the collection of uniforms by Lienhart & Humbert, 1902.

Under the monarchy, alongside army intendants, war commissioners were responsible for the army's administration. This institution, inherited from the Ancien Régime, was reformed multiple times during the Revolution, with the roles of intendants abolished and the war commissioners reorganized. Their titles evolved through several legislative adjustments. This war commissariat underwent another reform early in the Consulate, on 9 Pluviôse, Year VIII (January 29, 1800).

In 1803, the corps was restructured into Chief War Commissioners, Division War Commissioners, and Ordinary War Commissioners. During the Empire, each army had a General Intendant responsible for all administrative services.

The responsibilities of this corps had already been defined in a law passed on 28 Nivôse, Year III. These duties included: "monitoring all kinds of supplies for the armies and military garrisons; collecting contributions in enemy territories; overseeing stages and military convoys; managing food, artillery, and ambulance convoys; maintaining hospitals, prisons, guardhouses, and other military establishments; distributing food, forage, fuel, clothing, and equipment; and verifying expenses arising from these distributions, as well as all other expenses except soldier salaries." (Note: Quoted by Pigeard in Le service des vivres dans les armées du Premier Empire (1804–1815).)

=== Inspection officers ===
The corps of inspection officers was created during the Revolution to complement the war commissioners. They were tasked with the administration and oversight of military units, as well as the management of administrative councils and personnel. By 1801, members of this corps held titles such as Chief Inspectors, Inspectors, and Sub-Inspectors of the 1st, 2nd, and 3rd classes. A decree dated April 18, 1811, also introduced the position of Deputy to the Sub-Inspectors of Inspections.

These inspectors were "responsible for the organization, brigade assignments, incorporations, recruitments, disbandments, salaries, and accounting of military units, as well as maintaining records and conducting inspections." They were selected from among senior and general officers deemed worthy due to their talent, dedication, and integrity."

== Infrastructure supporting the war effort and armies ==
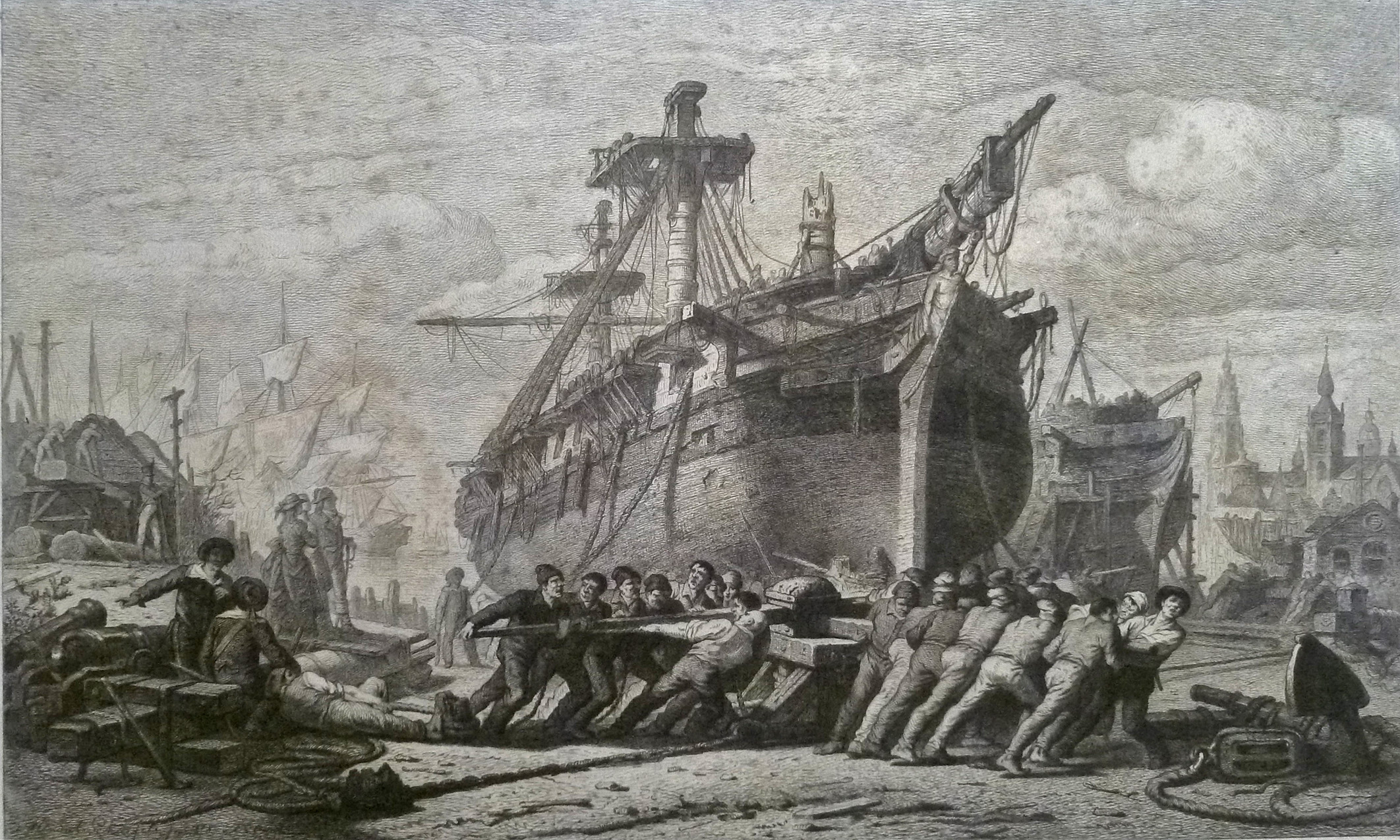
The Antwerp shipyard in Belgium in 1804.

During the Napoleonic era, various infrastructures – shipyards, arsenals, warehouses, and manufacturing facilities – were developed or established to support the war effort. As mentioned earlier, the cannon foundry in Liège was inaugurated in 1803. Later that same year, an arms factory was established in Mutzig, within the castle and its outbuildings acquired by the Coulaux brothers, who also managed the Klingenthal arms factory. Bakeries, uniform production workshops, and storage facilities were set up in the countries traversed by the Imperial Army during its campaigns in Germany, Austria, Poland, and Belarus, organized by Pierre Daru, the army's intendant general.

During the Napoleonic Wars, military engineering played a crucial role in building bridges and improving roads in occupied territories to facilitate the movement of troops and their supplies. At the end of the Consulate, the road network planned by Jean-Antoine Chaptal was expanded across France, giving rise to the "imperial roads" system.

== Military logistics and administration during campaigns ==
=== Formation of the Grande Armée and Early Campaigns (1803–1806) ===
==== The Camp of Boulogne ====
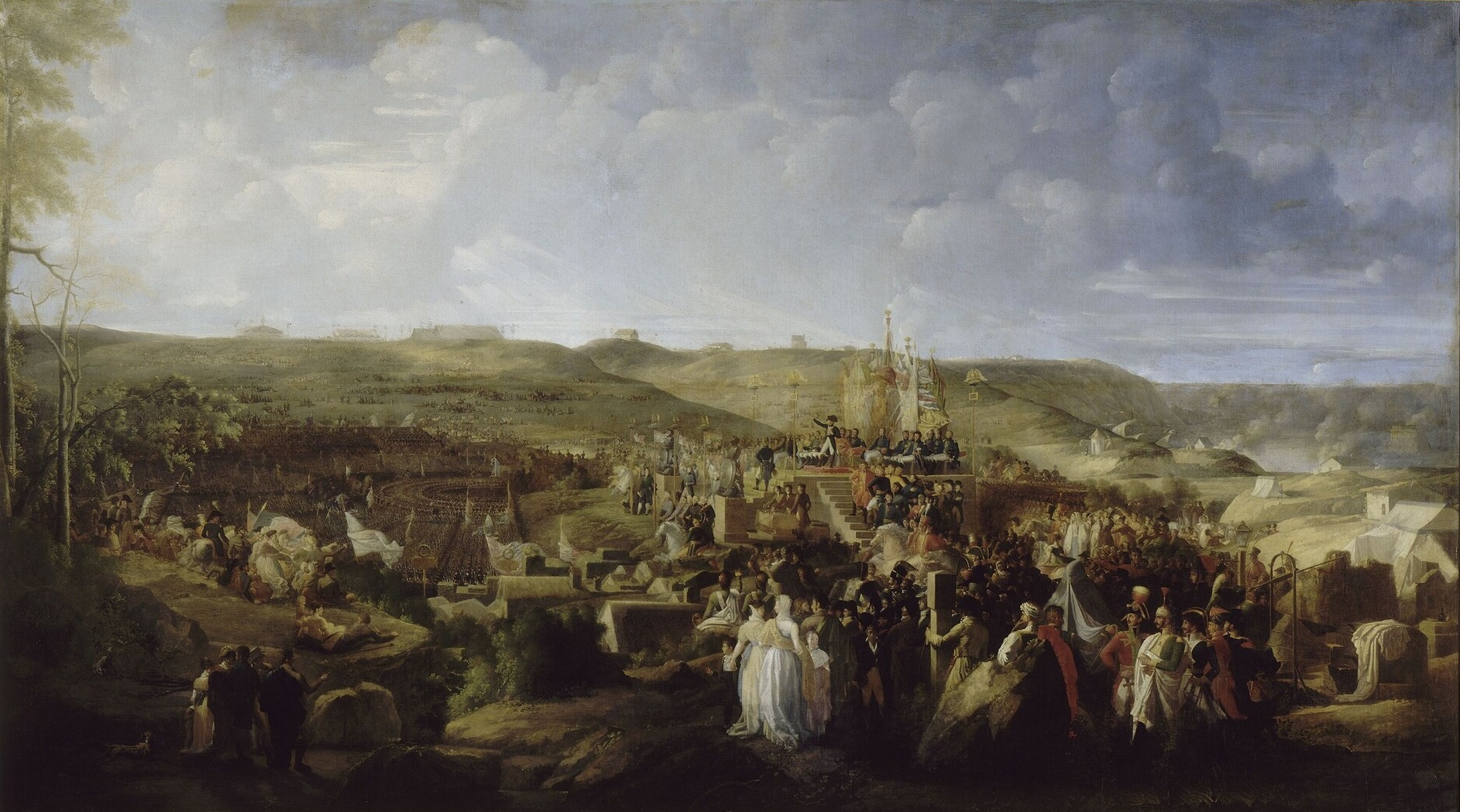
Napoleon Distributing the Legion of Honour at the Camp of Boulogne by Philippe-Auguste Hennequin

On August 31, 1805, the Army of the Coasts of the Ocean, a Revolutionary-era force reassembled from 1803 at the "Camp of Boulogne" – a vast complex of camps stretching from Pas-de-Calais to Bruges in Belgium and Utrecht in the Netherlands – was renamed the Grande Armée by an imperial general staff order. This renaming coincided with Napoleon's shift in strategy, abandoning plans to invade Britain, as his fleet was blockaded by the British navy in Cádiz since July 22. Instead, Napoleon focused on confronting Britain's allies in the Third Coalition on the continent.

The organization of the Grande Armée began on June 14, 1803, with Pierre Daru receiving an order on May 28 to establish a camp for 80,000 to 90,000 men in Saint-Omer. Initially, he submitted a report outlining the logistical and administrative imperatives: "Provisions must be secured for six months [...] 100,000 daily rations are needed [...] and for 18,000 horses, 20,000 [...] Additionally, 2,400 horses will be required for artillery, 636 for supplies, and 160 for ambulances [...] The administration must conduct inspections, avoid incapable or immoral agents, and provide all necessary means."

==== Early campaigns (1805–1806) ====
Following the ideas of Guibert, Napoleon's military doctrine was primarily focused on movement and offense. His priority was to make his battle corps highly mobile and as lightweight as possible, leaving logistics to "follow." His marching columns were relieved of their impedimenta (baggage and equipment) as much as possible, preceded by detachments with commissioners and inspectors tasked with preparing the way ahead using all available means (depots, purchases, requisitions). The artillery and transport for equipment, munitions, and provisions followed, mainly handled by civilian carriers.

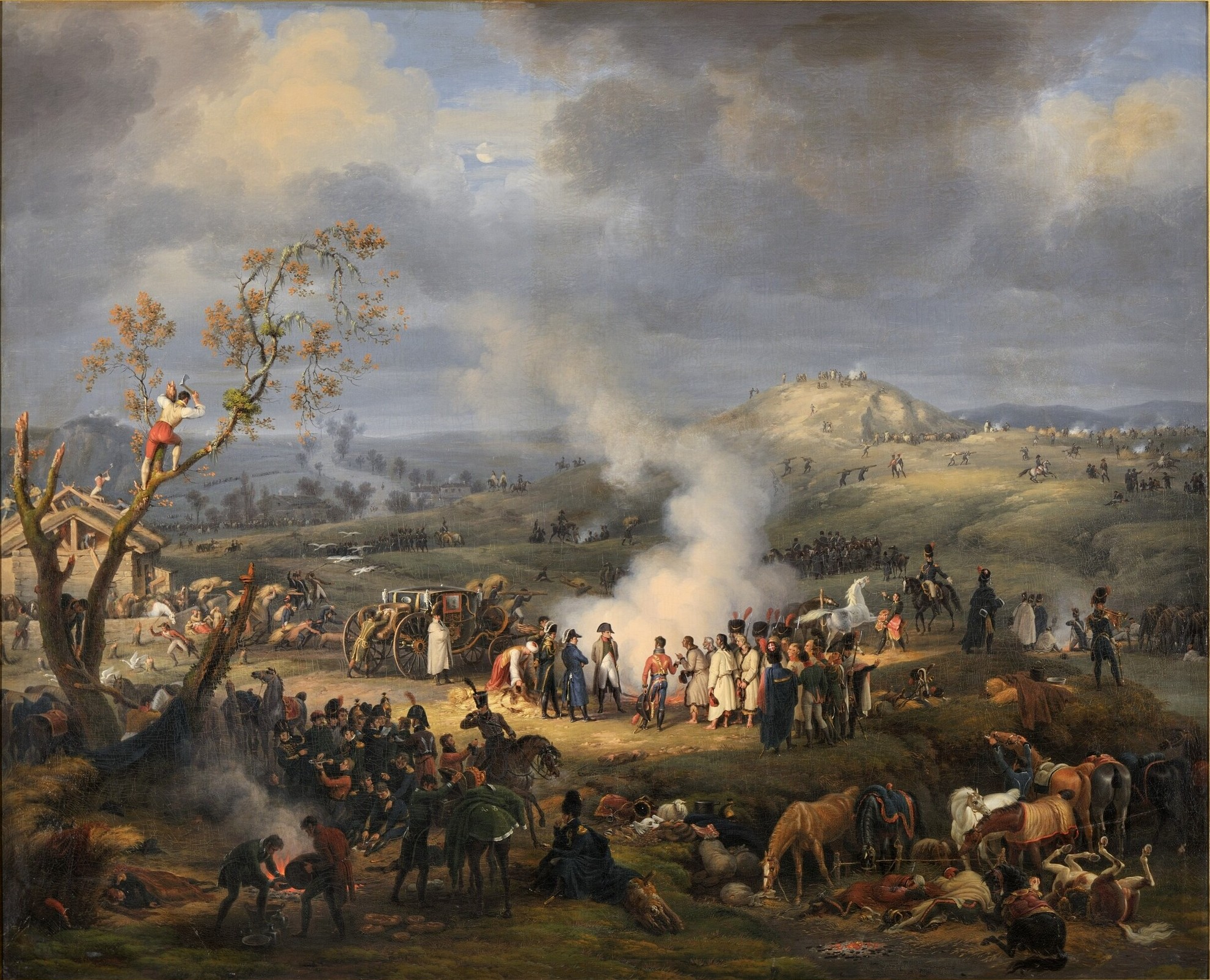
The bivouac of the Grande Armée at the dawn of the Battle of Austerlitz, after Louis-François Lejeune. The Austrian campaign of 1805 revealed the shortcomings of the quarter mastership of the Napoleonic army, which experienced its first real crisis during the Prussian and Polish campaign at the end of the following year.

On August 27, the Grande Armée marched eastward into central Europe, beginning the Austrian campaign, which culminated on December 2 with the victory at Austerlitz and was formalized through the Treaty of Pressburg and the first Treaty of Schönbrunn. The campaign started well: "The five army corps traversing France were supplied and fed at every stage: logistics were well managed [...] Before crossing the Rhine, Napoleon ensured every soldier was equipped with four pairs of shoes, four days' worth of bread, and four days' worth of biscuits."

"The first issue was that the army, to be properly supplied, needed to move constantly; otherwise, logistical problems could become critical, necessitating reliance on warehouses. During the 1805 campaign, while the Grande Armée mostly lived off the lands it passed through, this was largely out of necessity (the rations meant to be stockpiled along its route in Strasbourg, Mainz, and Bavaria were not ready on time and were therefore insufficient). (Note: General Dejean, Minister of Military Administration, was tasked with assembling stocks of 500,000 rations in Strasbourg and 200,000 in Mainz; the Elector of Bavaria was to gather 1,000,000 between Würzburg and Ulm, all within less than a month. However, these stocks only represented ten days of rations. See Pimor, Yves; Fender, Michel (2008). Logistique Production – Distribution – Soutien [Logistics: Production – Distribution – Support] (in French) (5th ed.). Dunod. p. 68.) Some moments were rather critical. Significant difficulties arose when the army had to concentrate in a limited area, such as at Ulm or during the subsequent march to Vienna along a single route following the Danube. In these instances, the lands traversed were insufficient to sustain the army, requiring reliance on warehouse reserves or prior provisions," with the main issue being transporting these supplies to the troops' stages and bivouacs.

A serious crisis emerged during the Prussian and Polish campaign (1806–1807). At the end of 1806, anticipating Russian intervention, Napoleon brought reinforcements from France to bolster the Grande Armée: "In one month, 670 officers, over 20,000 troops, and nearly 3,000 horses arrived from Mainz. The army could thus face the Russians with confidence, advancing rapidly despite logistics struggling to keep up [...] Supplies grew scarcer as the army moved east. Lannes likened the desolation to the Sinai Desert [...] In Warsaw, where Murat and Davout arrived in late November, there were only 550,000 bread rations and 95,000 of oats. Bernadotte and Soult's corps were poorly supplied [...] Chaos and hunger were such that an order threatened punishment, even arrest, for officers stopping supply convoys [...] Supply to units was slowed or halted due to transport difficulties during a harsh winter in a country with limited communication routes."

=== Remounts of cavalry and army horses ===
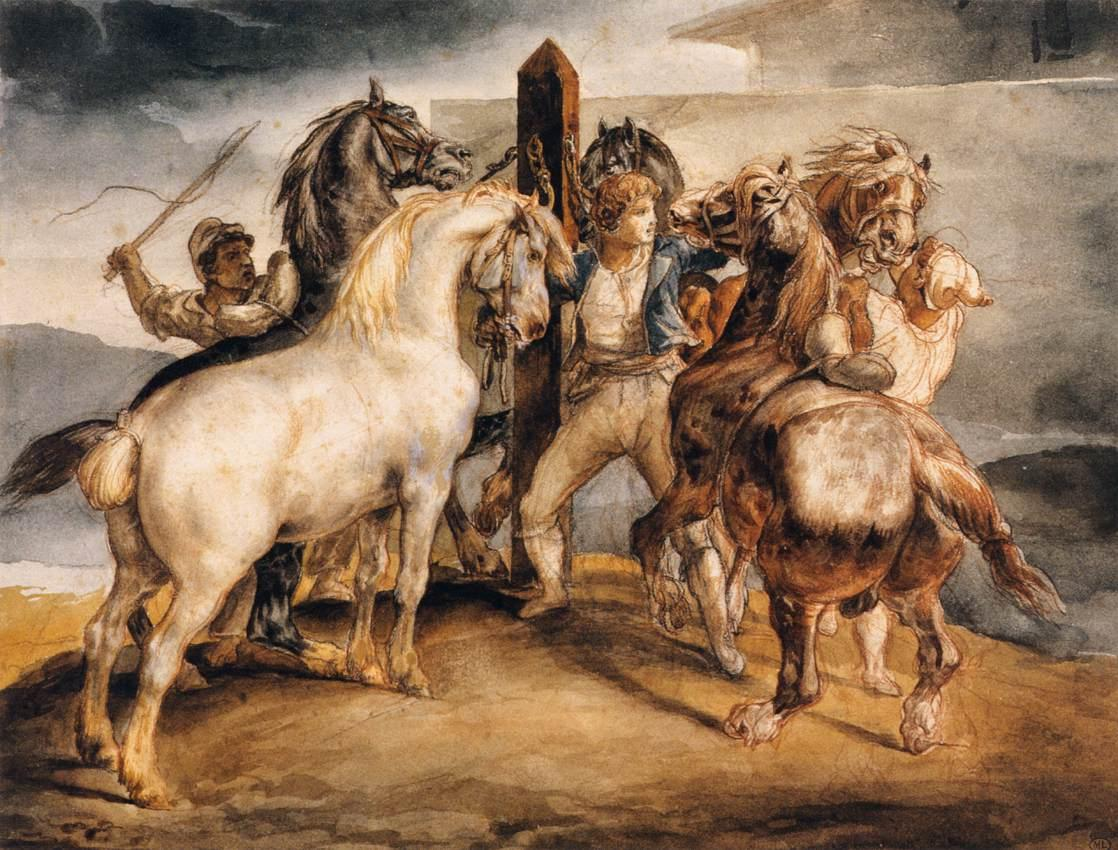
Horse traders in the late 1810s after Théodore Géricault.

While the imperial cavalry penned some of the most glorious pages in the history of the Napoleonic Wars, the supply of horses – both saddle and draft – remained a recurring issue for the French army. This was largely due to the poor quality of the French equine stock of the time, a concern highlighted by historian Denis Bogros in his work Histoire du cheval de troupe de la cavalerie française 1515–1918. According to Bogros, the problem was compounded by the reluctance of the rural population to meet military demands. He notes, "Farmers, already disinclined to produce war-ready saddle horses, deliberately focused on breeding low-quality horses sufficient for short-distance agricultural tasks. They hoped to discourage state levies, but this tactic failed, sending poorly equipped cavalrymen into combat instead."

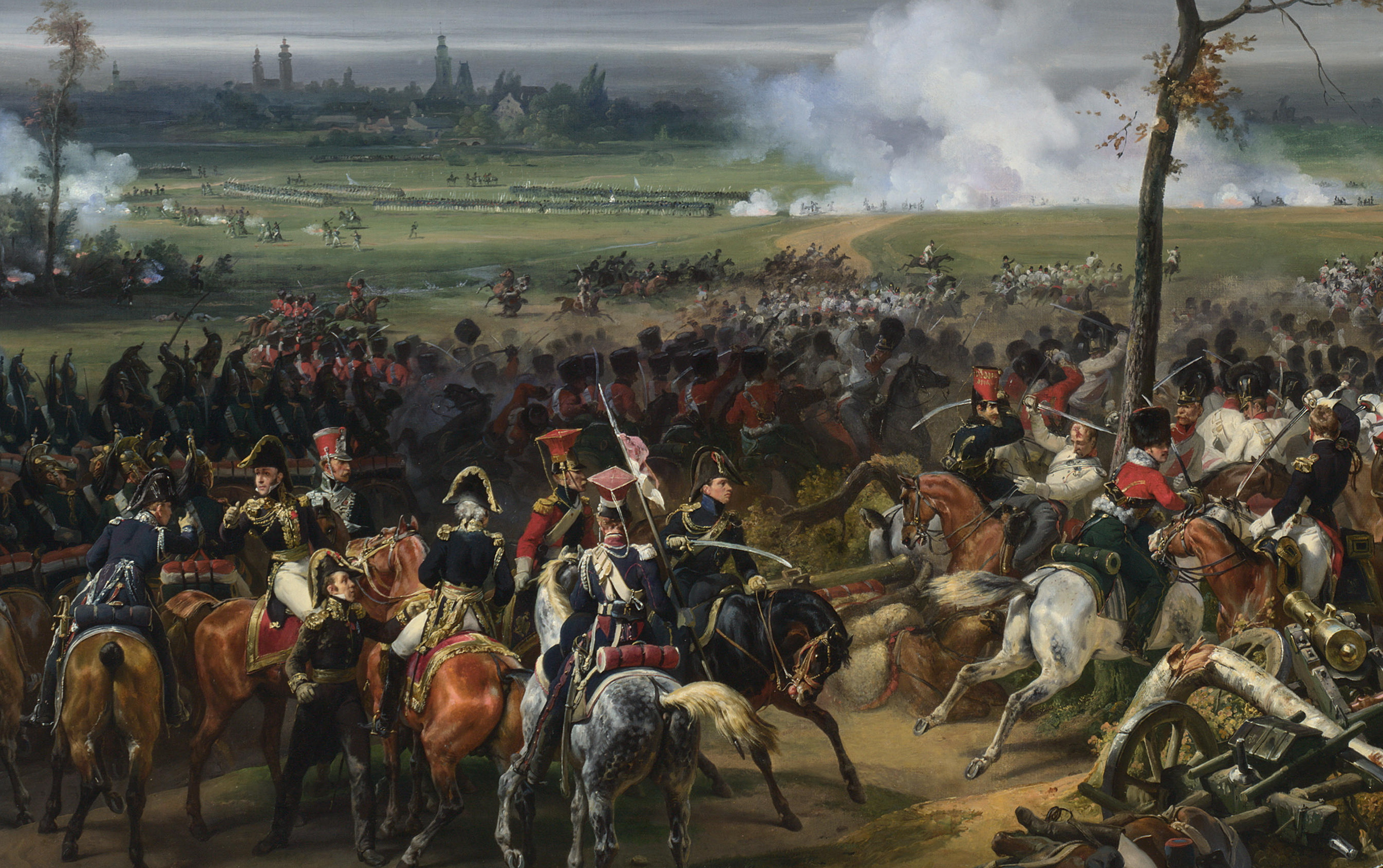
French cavalry at the Battle of Hanau.

Moreover, the incompetence of civilian and military officials overseeing remounts, including the Emperor himself, exacerbated the situation. Bogros asserts, "The truth is that Napoleon I cannot escape the judgment of history. He lacked (according to the scholar Mennessier de La Lance) knowledge of equine management, a shortcoming that contributed to the horrendous consumption of horses during the wars he declared and the campaigns he led. [...] Napoleon was the head of the French government. Army remounts are a serious undertaking that cannot be improvised. As both head of state and commander-in-chief, Napoleon failed to address this crucial matter." Consequently, "Regarding troop horses, [...] it is clear that the Empire's remount system only supplied horses unfit for war."

"Until 1807, regimental remounts were managed by an officer who generally relied on designated merchants. Subsequently, a commission purchased horses for the army at fairs and depots, distributing them to regiments. In enemy territories, reliance often fell on war spoils and requisitions."

=== Army supply during campaigns ===
Napoleon I, inspired by Guibert, decided to sustain his troops during most campaigns by living off the land rather than relying on lengthy supply convoys stretching back to France along extended lines of communication.

— Eugène Chalvardjian, Impact de l'art de la guerre napoléonien dans la seconde moitié du XIXe siècle

In the field, soldiers were theoretically entitled to precise food rations. In practice, however, the Emperor's desire for speed and to lighten the soldiers' loads often led to provisioning the army from the lands they crossed. [...] Requisitions appeared; tolerable in wealthy regions (Germany, Austria, Northern Italy), they became nearly ineffective in Poland, Spain, Portugal, and Russia.

— Alain Pigeard, Les services des vivres dans les armées du Premier Empire (1804–1815)

Until the 18th century, warfare primarily involved set battles and sieges, with "maneuver warfare" limited to skirmishes within the context of la petite guerre, aimed chiefly at seizing supplies from enemy armies. Campaigns often consisted of long marches, with armies burdened by baggage trains and supply convoys. Logistics were managed by private contractors (munitionnaires), and armies still heavily depended on their rear bases for supplies. Straying too far from these bases forced them to live off the land, friend or foe, constraining their operational flexibility. (Note: Criticizing Marshal Villeroy following his defeat at the Battle of Ramillies, Voltaire, in his Siècle de Louis XIV, reproaches him in particular for having left his baggage installed between his lines, thus hampering his ability to maneuver in the face of the changes of "tempo" imposed by his adversary, the Duke of Marlborough.)

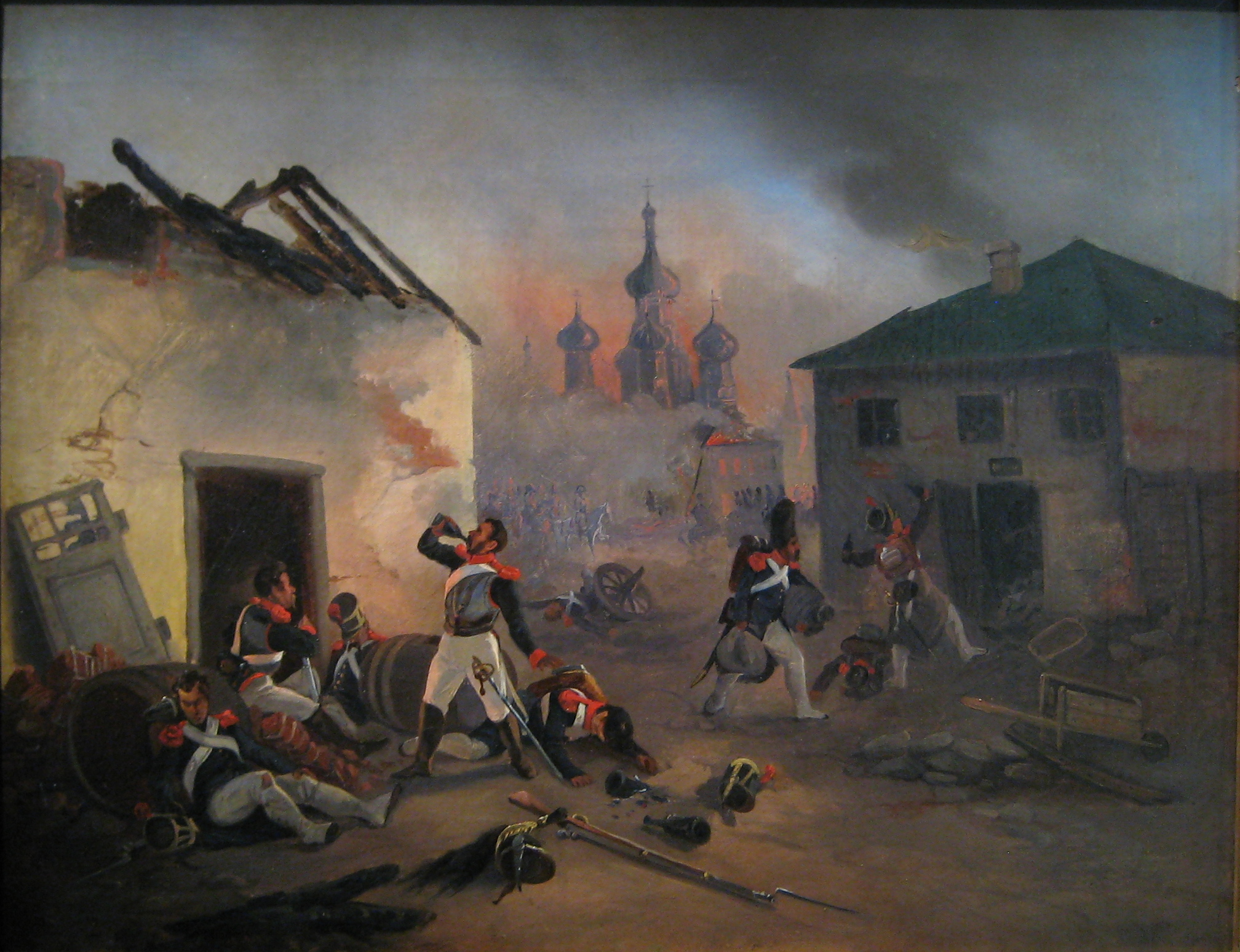
Marauding soldiers in Moscow in 1812. The scorched earth tactics practiced by the Russians prevented the Grande Armée from living off the country's resources.

The Revolutionary Wars required the French army to operate repeatedly on foreign soil – in the Netherlands, Switzerland, Italy, and Egypt. The chaos in France compelled the army to rely on expedients, local requisitions, looting, and even outright plundering. Napoleon's military tempo, established during the Consulate, relied on rapid maneuvers and encirclement strategies. However, this approach forced armies to locally improvise their supplies. Even so, "the Napoleonic system of warfare had its limitations, and his armies could not entirely sustain themselves on local resources."

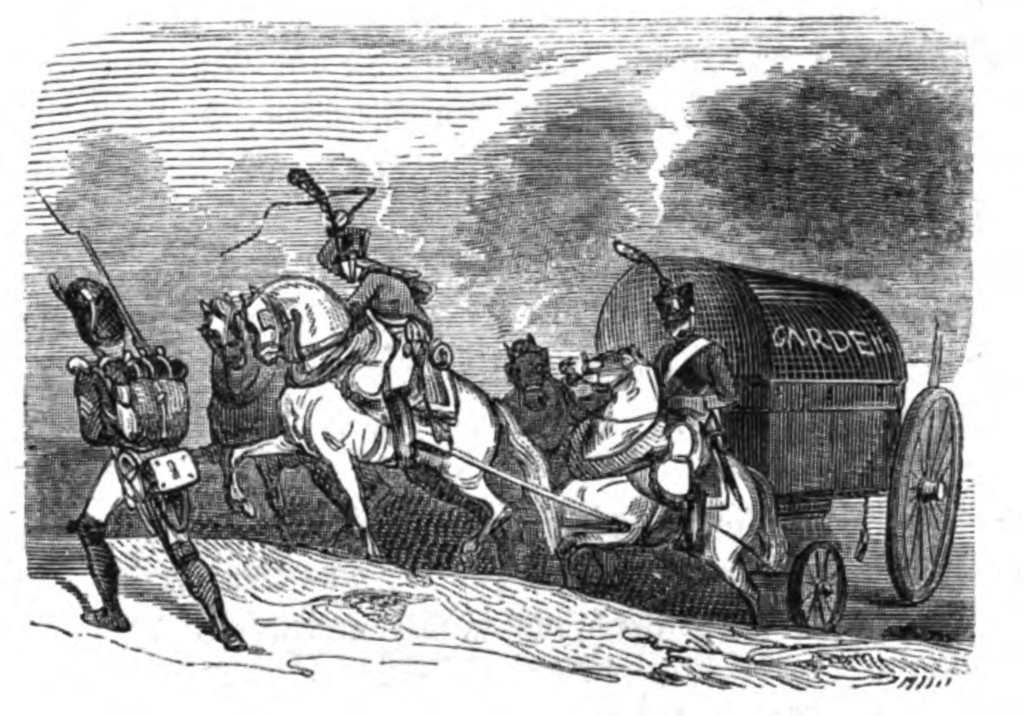
Imperial Guard Train Crew.

In 1810, following the French invasion of Portugal, a prolonged war of attrition ensued, with both sides resorting to scorched-earth tactics. This led to famine and devastation for the Portuguese population but also weakened Napoleon's forces. Ultimately, "Masséna [...] had no choice but to decide between watching his army succumb to famine and the Anglo-Portuguese sword, or resigning himself to the humiliation of a voluntary retreat."

Transporting supplies posed yet another challenge for the Napoleonic army's administration. "At the start of the Revolutionary Wars, all transport was handled by the civilian sector. Ammunition was transported by civilian convoys, and artillery relied on civilian contractors to move its guns and equipment. Under the Empire, a major company, the 'Breidt Company,' provided wagons, drivers, and horse teams to the army, but it so disappointed Napoleon during the Eylau campaign that he was unable to maneuver as he wished." (Note: The Emperor called the company's people "a bunch of beggars" in his correspondence. Madec, Gabriel (2010). Correspondance générale de Napoléon Bonaparte. Tome 7 : 1807 – Tilsit, l'apogée de l'Empire [General Correspondence of Napoleon Bonaparte. Volume 7: 1807 – Tilsit, the Apogee of the Empire] (in French). Fondation Napoléon.) This failure prompted him to decree that logistical transport should be managed by the army itself, leading to the creation of the train corps.

==== The provisions ====
The composition of the troops' rations was directly influenced by the Emperor himself, through his correspondence or by orders and decrees. In March 1806, he signed a decree concerning "the nourishment of troops through ordinary means," aiming to "provide soldiers in the armies with more abundant food to maintain their health and strengthen their constitution." This decree regulated supply budgets, specified the quantities of bread, meat, vegetables, and soup to be distributed to the troops, and established the practical organization for these provisions. By November, as the army was engaged in the Prussia and Poland campaign since October, "Napoleon, who was in Berlin, denounced the poverty of food stores, which held only eight days' worth of stock. The difficulties were especially pronounced in Poland due to the country's poverty. The Emperor arranged for a bakery in Warsaw capable of producing 400,000 rations of bread daily using thirty ovens and two hundred bakers. Bennigsen's maneuver in northern Poland forced Napoleon to relocate his troops, requiring provisions to follow. Each corps carried four days' worth of supplies, live meat, and sacks of flour in the wagons of the Breidt company, which was responsible for transport."

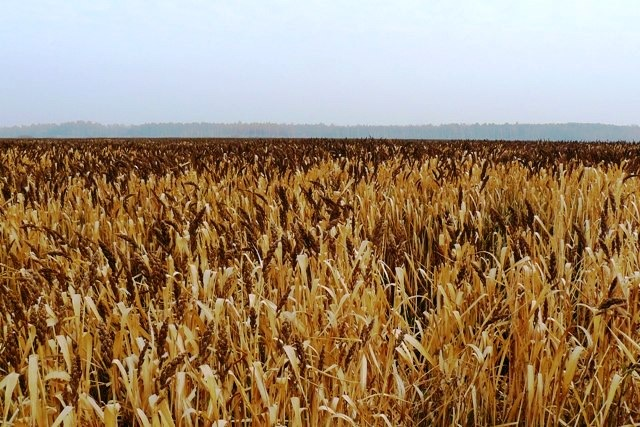
Rye fields in Belarus. This country will become the granary of the Napoleonic army during the Russian campaign. "I requested, fifteen days ago, 6,000 quintals of flour from Borisov: 2,000 have arrived here, I order that the other 4,000 be directed to Orsha. I am requesting 10,000 from Minsk, 4,000 from Sienno, and I am sending agents to organize these convoys and direct them to Orsha". Letter from Napoleon to Marshal Davout dated August 10, 1812 from Vitebsk.

In 1812, on the eve of the Russian campaign, drawing from the harsh experiences of the Polish campaign, where the French army faced a particularly severe winter exacerbated by supply challenges, Napoleon paid special attention to logistical organization. By February, the soldier's daily ration included "one and a half pounds of standard bread made from two-thirds rye and one-third wheat, 120 grams of pure wheat white bread, 300 grams of meat (including head and offal), 240 grams of dried vegetables or two pounds of potatoes, 1/30th of a pound of salt, and 1/16th of a pint of brandy." On July 2, in a letter from Vilnius to Berthier, the Major General of the Grande Armée, Napoleon expressed concern over delays in constructing bread ovens in the city. On July 11, he revisited the issue in two letters to Berthier and the Duke of Treviso, commander of the Young Guard, specifying the ration for Roguet's division: "ensure everyone has provisions, consisting of half a ration of bread, one and a half to two ounces of rice, and one pound of meat, for July 12 to 18." On August 10, he ordered Marshal Davout to build additional ovens in Orsha, Mogilev, Dubrowna, and Rossasna, effectively transforming Belarus into a logistical rear base. However, these measures were insufficient, and "to address the difficulty of distributing prepared bread to soldiers – not due to a lack of production but to the absence or inadequacy of ovens – Napoleon attempted to revert to the Roman system of distributing raw grain. This initiative failed due to the insoluble problem of processing raw grain without proper sieving and because bread made without removing bran was considered inedible." The Russian army's scorched-earth policy deprived the French army of the ability to live off the land, and Napoleon's decision to retreat from Moscow on the brink of winter led to the catastrophic Russian campaign, during which starvation, alongside cold, disease, and Cossack attacks, annihilated the Napoleonic army.

==== Requisitions and foraging ====
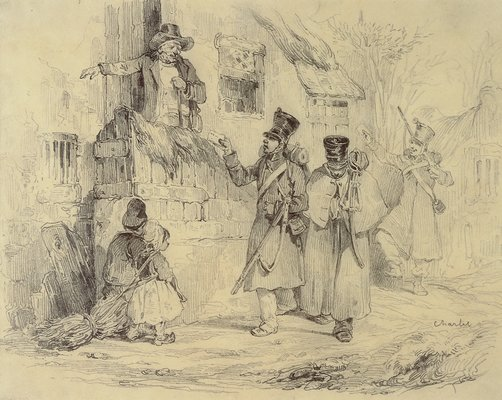
Soldiers presenting their accommodation vouchers to local residents, after Nicolas-Toussaint Charlet.

As the Napoleonic army operated far from its "home base" within the Empire's territory (France and annexed departments) and had to contend with underdeveloped logistics, these methods were essential for sustaining troops during campaigns. Though such measures were theoretically regulated, the army's needs and the unpredictability of campaigns often led to numerous abuses, including theft and plunder, especially in enemy-occupied or impoverished regions where populations were resistant or hostile to French troops. In Poland, occupied by the French since 1806, "peasants... hid food in the woods, at the tops of trees, or in pits covered with soil and branches... When our soldiers suspected a hiding spot, they would skillfully probe the ground with their rifle rods, much like a customs officer inspecting a vehicle. As soon as the rod met resistance, diggers and shovels went to work, uncovering crates of flour, lard, salted meats, dried vegetables, and potatoes." In his book 1809: The French in Vienna. Chronicle of an Occupation, historian Robert Ouvrard describes "the hardships endured by the poorest inhabitants in the countryside and cities, as well as the looting and abuses of all kinds suffered by the Austrians under occupation." Austria, forced to provide for the occupying forces, saw "the consumption of Vienna's inhabitants reduced by 20 to 25 percent."

Requisitions were also a means of supplying the army with horses, which were in high demand. During the 1806–1807 campaigns, "nearly 12,000 horses were requisitioned in Silesia, Mecklenburg, Hanover, and Brunswick... The Guard Dragoons were entirely remounted in Potsdam."

==== Vivandières and itinerant merchants ====
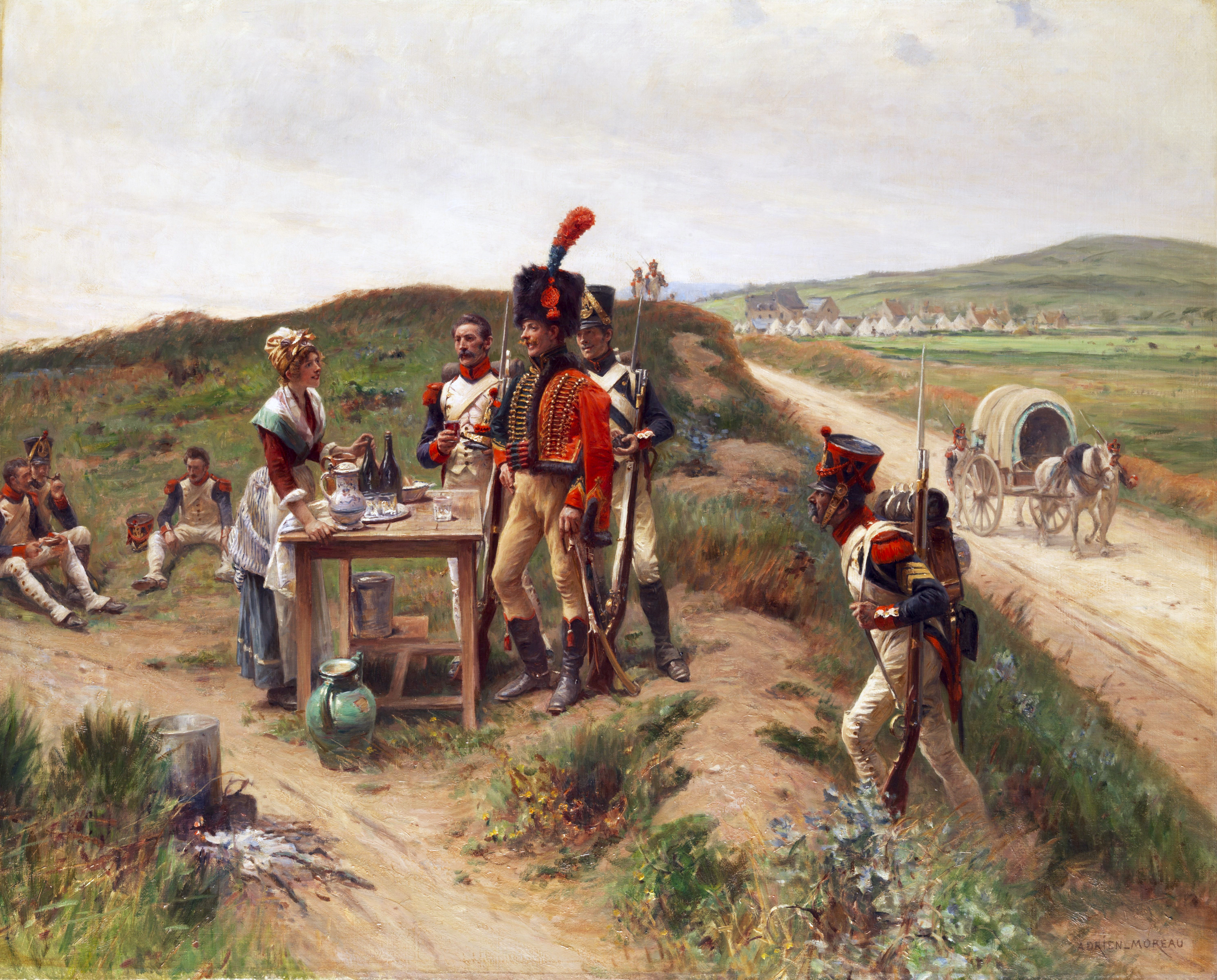
French soldiers stocking up on supplies from a canteen.

During the Napoleonic Wars, the imperial armies lacked equivalents to the modern army commissariat or the "army cooperatives" of the World Wars. Supplying the troops with "canteen items" and "ordinary provisions" – tobacco, wines and spirits, haberdashery, etc. – was handled by vivandières and cantinières, itinerant merchants, local tradesmen, or simply through plunder of local populations or enemy baggage trains. Jean-Roch Coignet recounts in his memoirs, through various anecdotes, how he and his comrades procured such items.

==== Horse maintenance ====
Feeding, maintaining, and caring for horses were major challenges for early 19th-century armies, as horses were critical "tools" for missions involving cavalry, logistics, artillery transport, and communication (courier services). "The French cavalry reached 150,000 horses at its peak," while tens of thousands more were used in transport services or ambulances.

The Napoleonic army faced difficulties in acquiring quality horses in sufficient numbers – losses during the 1805 German and Austrian campaigns stemmed from the excessive fatigue of overly young horses. Maintaining these equine resources during campaigns posed another serious issue, with many animals lost due to inadequate care or insufficient, poor-quality food. For instance, "the Polish campaign of 1807, beginning in winter 1806, was grueling for horses operating in a country devoid of supplies and traversed by muddy roads. Twenty thousand horses perished from exhaustion."

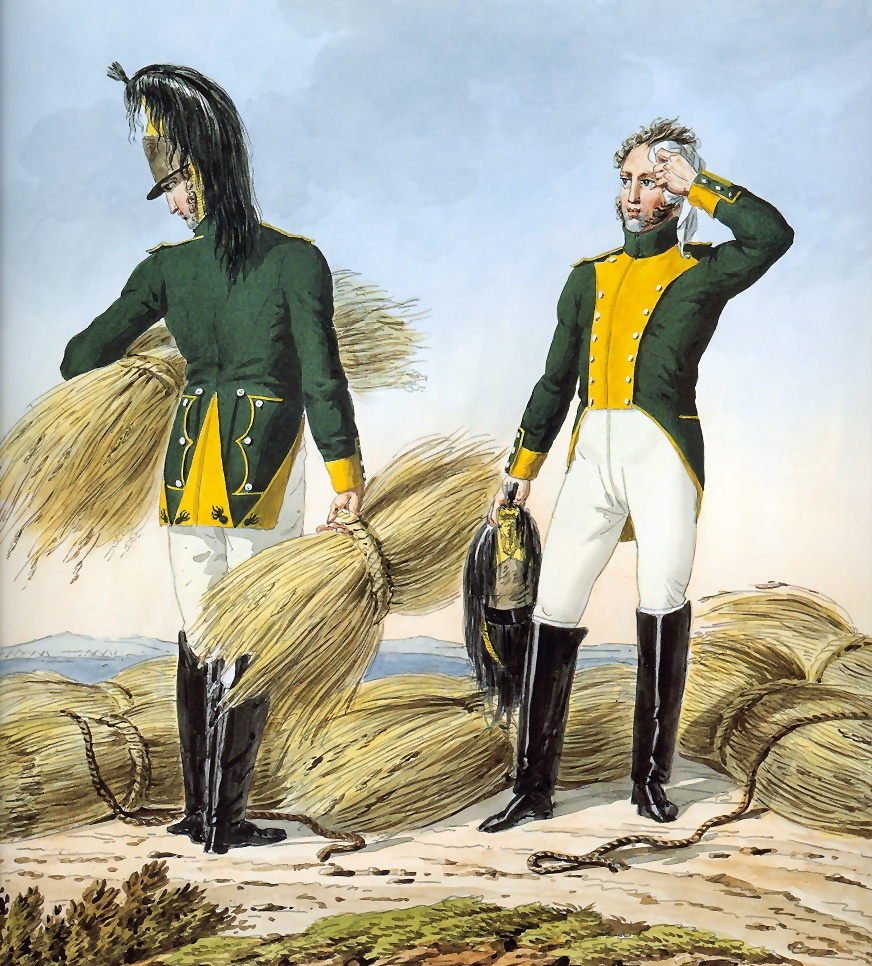
Foragers of the 23rd Dragoon Regiment, after Carle Vernet.

Equine feeding required particular attention to nutritional balance: "Oats give horses 'blood' [...] Straw, a coarse feed meant to fill the stomach, requires nearly as much energy to chew as it provides through digestion." The logistics of equine sustenance were immense: "Based on the 1810 ration table [...] allocating 7.5–9.0 kg of hay, equivalent straw, and 8.5–9.5 liters of oats per horse daily, depending on the unit and role, about 3,000–3,500 tons of feed were needed daily, requiring 2,000 wagons drawn by 8,000 horses." Like troop supplies, animal provisioning relied on "living off the land," with "foragers" tasked with finding or cutting straw and hay.

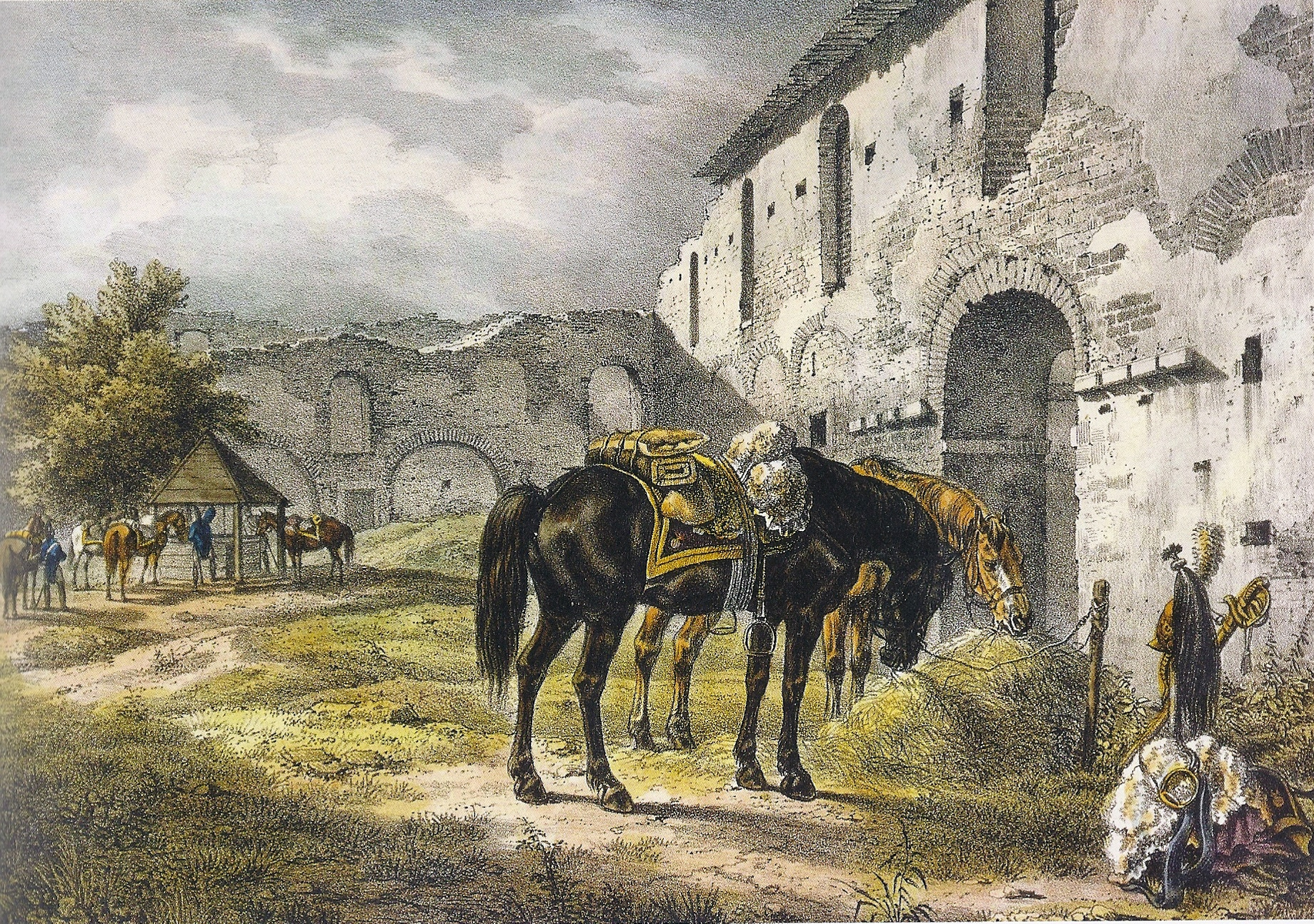
Horses of the French cavalry resting in Russia in 1812.

During marches, factors such as the length of stages, pace, pauses, feeding, and watering (Note: During the Belgian campaign of August 1914, which was particularly hot, the French cavalry lost a large number of horses to colic and fever after allowing animals, thirsty from the heat, to drink from ditches and pools of stagnant water infested with bacteria.) were vital for the sustainable management of horses, especially draft animals. "Each stage begins with a walk for an hour. A ten-minute halt follows to allow horses to relieve themselves. Riders tighten girths, check pack loads, and continue at a walk, then transition to a trot for two hours, alternating paces as needed. In steep ascents and descents, riders dismount. Upon arrival, horses are groomed, fed, and, if possible, sheltered in buildings converted into improvised stables."

The catastrophic loss of horses during the Russian campaign stemmed largely from disease, neglect, and poor feeding, apparent from the outset: "Crossing the Niemen occurred too early. Rye, wheat, and oats, just sprouting, were cut prematurely, leading to the death of 7,000–8,000 horses by late June [...] On the snowy return, with only thatched roofs as fodder, survival was impossible." General Charles Pierre Lubin Griois noted in his memoirs: "The horses, drenched during the day and without shelter at night, had only wet green rye for food. Many perished; the road was strewn with their carcasses. Over three days, the army lost at least a quarter of its artillery horses and numerous cavalry horses, though to a lesser extent due to their lighter workload."

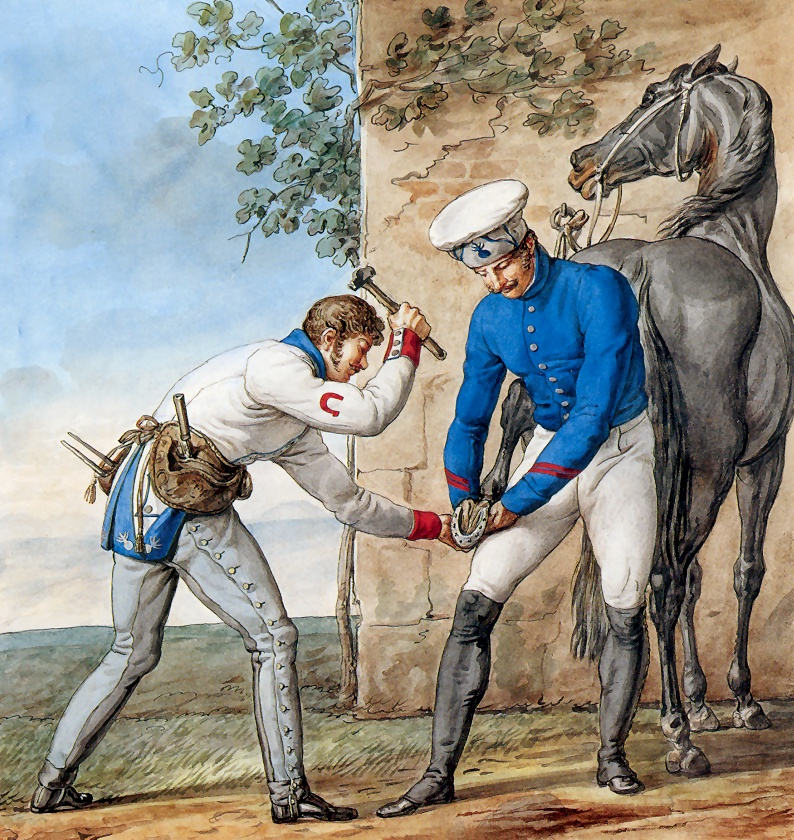
Farriers of the 1st Carabinieri Regiment, after Carle Vernet.

In addition to maintenance by mounted troops, horse care in campaigns fell to farriers and veterinarians. Most injuries rendering horses unfit for service involved leg or hoof trauma, making hoof care and shoeing essential, tasks performed by farriers, who also treated minor ailments or injuries. Supervising these activities was the unit "master farrier," an "artiste-vétérinaire" title introduced in 1776 as part of a nascent equine logistics system. In 1793, they were integrated into unit staff.

The Old Regime initiated a true veterinary service within the military, with state-funded veterinary student training. During the Consulate in 1799, 20 students were sent to train at the École Nationale Vétérinaire d'Alfort or its counterparts in Lyon and Turin. Later, a decree on May 13, 1804, allowed mounted troop units to send officers and non-commissioned officers for veterinary training. By April 22, 1807, a second veterinarian per regiment was mandated (allowing one to remain at the depot while the other accompanied the unit on campaigns). From January 1812, the army began employing auxiliary veterinarians, conscripts without formal diplomas serving as "equine nurses."

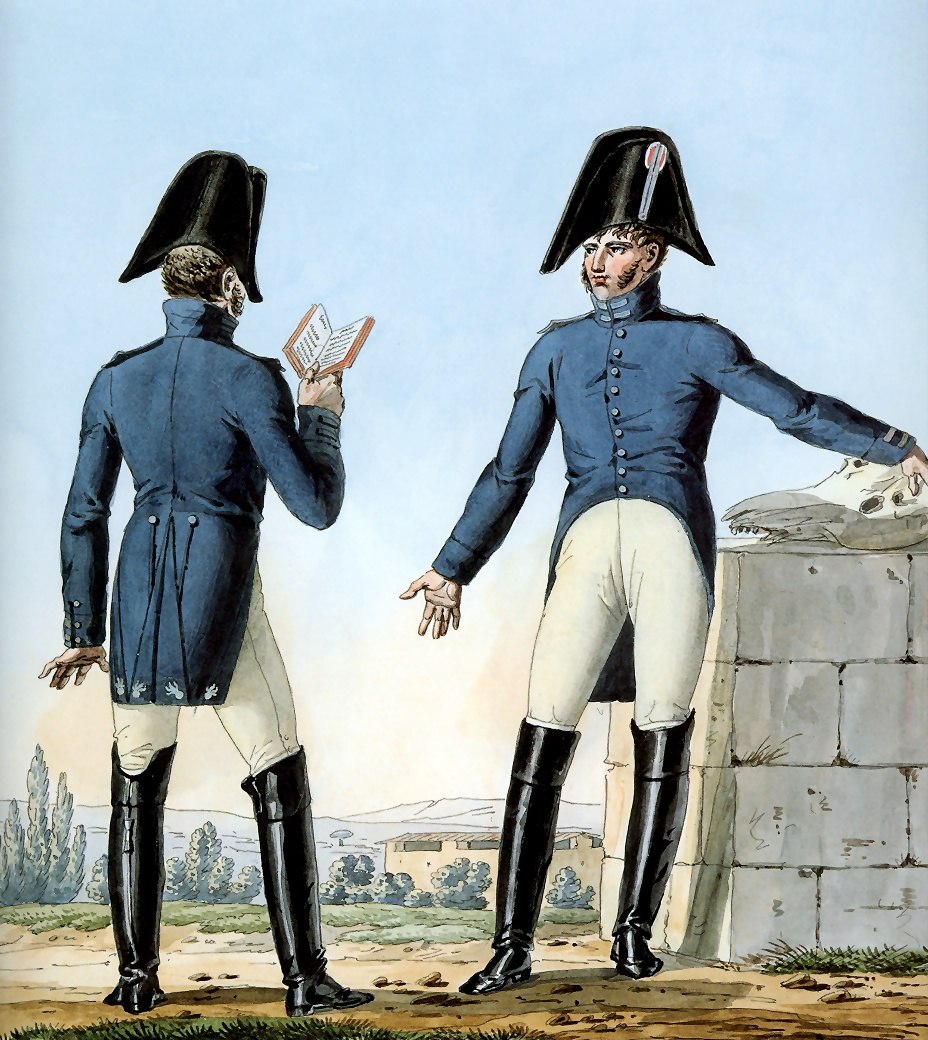
Military veterinarians, according to Carle Vernet.

An imperial decree on January 15, 1813, formalized the veterinary profession nationally, granting those completing three years of study the title "farrier veterinarian" or "medical veterinarian" following additional training at Alfort. Farrier veterinarians were assigned to depots and mounted unit squadrons to treat sick horses, oversee farrier services, and handle challenging shoeing cases. Veterinarians also inspected general depots, major remount centers, artillery parks, and engineering and equipment units.

A report from 1811 by General Claude Antoine Hippolyte de Préval, a cavalry officer and State Council official, tempered expectations regarding military veterinarians' roles: "The importance of veterinarians in the corps is often exaggerated, as is the necessity of extensive skills. Even in peacetime, severe or prolonged illnesses are rare. The cost of food and medicines compared to the horse's value, the uncertainty of recovery, and the questionable utility of a recovered horse almost always lead to selling them. Campaign mobility and the number of horses to treat force abandonment of the severely ill. At depots, there are few sick horses since they are sent to the army upon arrival. Similarly, their role in remounts is overstated. The key is assessing a horse's capability, and in this, the experience of instructors and dealers surpasses any theory. Horses are best judged through frequent riding and observing their gait under whip and reins."

=== Logistics and administration of the Imperial guard ===
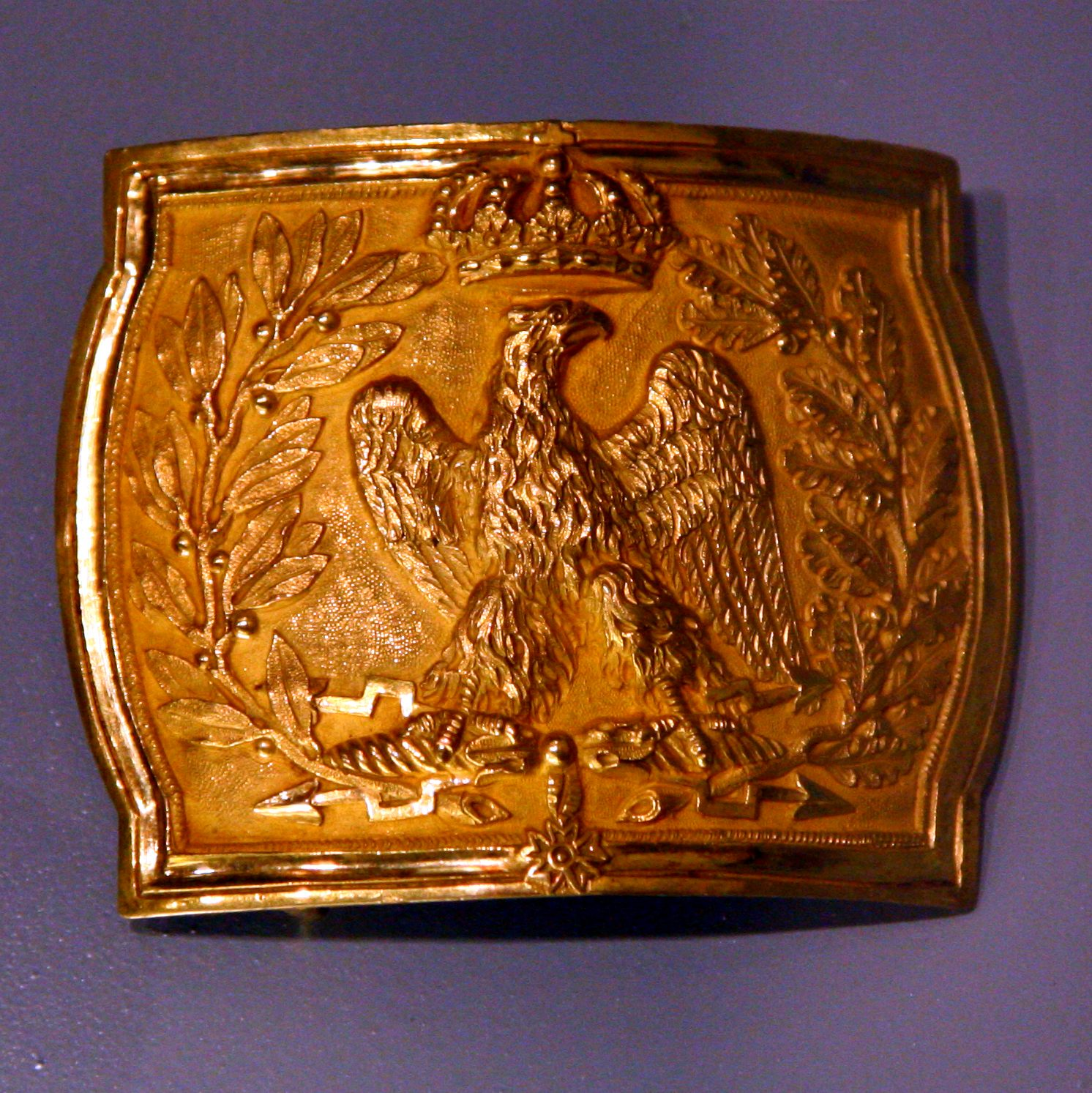
Imperial Guard officer's belt buckle.

The Imperial Guard, an elite and prestigious unit of Napoleon's army, was given particular attention by the Emperor, especially regarding its equipment and weaponry. For instance, the general uniform reform of 1812, which temporarily introduced white uniforms, was not applied to this distinguished corps. The Guard's weapons primarily came from the Versailles arms factory. While identical to the Year IX armament system issued to the regular line troops, they stood out for their superior quality and finish. For example, the Guard's musket differed from the line troops' version by using brass instead of iron for components like the barrel bands, trigger guard, and butt plate (the end of the stock braced against the shoulder before firing).

This corps enjoyed other "logistical privileges" until 1815: it had its own master tailor, with each regiment including a master tailor and master cobbler in its staff. In the field, the Guards received the best accommodations, and supplies were prioritized for them. Special care was given to the remounting of its cavalry.

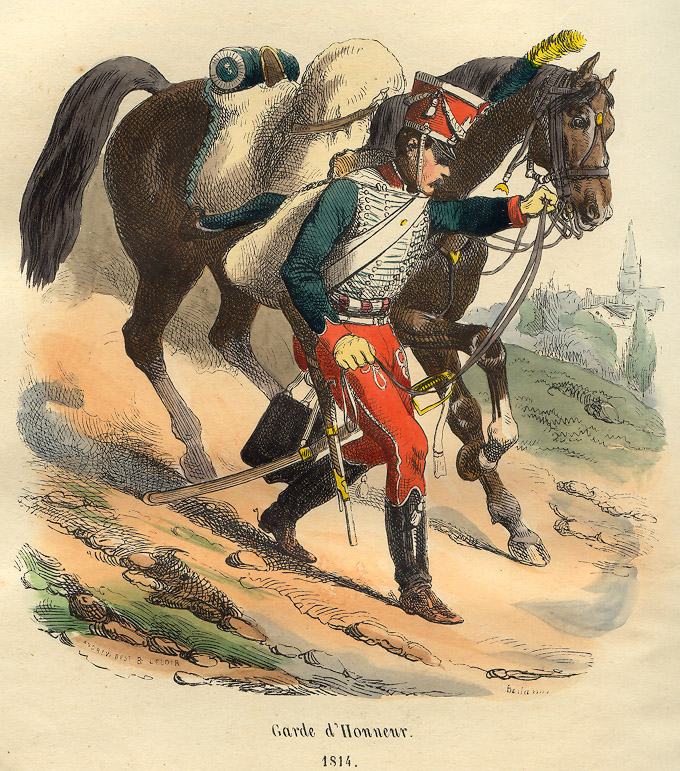
Guards of honour. Illustration by Hippolyte Bellangé. The soldiers of the four regiments constituting this light cavalry corps, who were supposed to equip themselves at their own expense, obtained their uniforms and military effects from artisans and small industries in the departments where the units were raised and, in principle, also had to acquire their mounts at their own expense.

At the beginning of 1813, after the disastrous Russian campaign, Napoleon had to enlist new troops to face the Sixth Coalition. On January 11, 1813, through a Senate decree, the Emperor mobilized a contingent of 350,000 men. A second decree followed on April 3, creating the Honor Guards – a new corps of four regiments attached to the Imperial Guard. "Its ranks were to be filled by the sons of the most esteemed families from the Empire's 130 departments," who were expected to provide their clothing, horses, and equipment at their expense. However, this "elitist" recruitment policy saw many exceptions, as "defeats scarcely inspired a military vocation in wealthy youth, who often paid less fortunate young men to serve as substitutes, merely providing funds for the equipment." Out of necessity, sons of modest and impoverished families began joining this new corps. In Haute-Garonne, an enlistment register was opened on April 20, and the recruitment "proceeded quickly and successfully, as by August 11, 1813, the department's full quota of Honor Guards had not only been met but exceeded, with 88 young men listed on the roster sent by the prefect to the War Minister." However, as in the Ain department, "it seems that the recruitment included more young men from modest backgrounds rather than the bourgeoisie and nobility as Napoleon had intended; among Haute-Garonne's 88 guards, 41 did not pay for their equipment, which was instead provided by the prefecture." Moreover, "38 Guards paid for their horses, while 50 received theirs from the prefect, and 40 purchased their harnesses, with 48 relying on the prefect for these supplies. Funds for the Guards unable to finance their equipment were drawn from a communal fund supported by the wealthiest individuals in the department."

Regarding the unit's logistics, after unsuccessful attempts to source uniforms locally in Toulouse, "a tailor from Tours was contracted to produce the Guards' attire, as suitable cloth was unavailable in Haute-Garonne." Two Toulouse manufacturers secured contracts to supply other equipment and horse harnesses. "On May 11, 1813, the contractor from Tours submitted a quote and samples to the Haute-Garonne prefect, pledging to produce the dolman, pelisse, Hungarian-style jacket, (Note: Light cavalry breeches covering three-quarters of the leg and decorated with Hungarian knots, embroidered interlacing on the front of the thigh, and a colored band on the external seam.) vest, cloak, forage cap, and sash with fine-quality scarlet and dark green cloth at 31 francs per meter." Meanwhile, "the two Toulouse manufacturers committed on May 25, 1813, to deliver, respectively, 60 pieces of equipment between June 15 and 20, and the remainder in the following twelve days."

=== The Hundred Days Army in 1815 ===
Anticipating the inevitable conflict with the Seventh Coalition, formed to oppose his return to power, Napoleon methodically organized the new "war effort" demanded by this international political situation, starting in April 1815.

Despite the losses sustained in previous campaigns, the remaining armaments were sufficient to equip a substantial force: the warehouses held 150,000 new muskets and 300,000 more in need of repair or reassembly. Numerous arms workshops in Paris were producing 1,500 muskets daily, with production expected to increase to 3,000–4,000 per day by July 1.

With priority given to armaments, the provisioning of equipment and uniforms took a backseat. Henry Lachouque, in his Waterloo 1815, described the Army of the North on campaign in Belgium as follows: "The appearance of the marching columns was dilapidated, but the imperial eagle badge shone above their foreheads. Taken from storage, this 'cuckoo' [...] resumed its place on shakos, bearskin caps, and helmets. Negligent soldiers made do by hammering out fleur-de-lis designs and removing Bourbon emblems. Polished to a shine, these remnants nonetheless accentuated the poverty of the coats, capes, and worn forage caps [...] They complemented the loose trousers of coarse fabric, hastily sewn together in workshops over ten weeks [...] Civilian overcoats with tarnished epaulets and military buttons led some units, evoking memories of 1796 for veterans and the Emperor alike. The 1st Chasseurs-à-Cheval went to battle wearing helmets from the King's regiment. Blue cloth was in short supply, but green or brown coats were preferable to no coats at all. The cavalry was in better condition, although some cuirassier regiments, particularly the 11th, lacked cuirasses [...] The overall appearance was less vibrant than the works of military painters might suggest."

== Economic consequences for Europe of the Napoleonic Wars ==
=== European conquests of the republic and the empire ===
The French Empire and its vassals in 1812.

After the Austrian campaigns of 1805 and the Prussian and Polish campaigns of 1806–1807, the mosaic of states that would become modern Germany found itself under occupation or "tutelage" as part of the Confederation of the Rhine, controlled by the French Empire. Its industrial resources were subsequently redirected to support France's war effort. Austria was occupied following the campaign of 1809.

=== Continental System ===
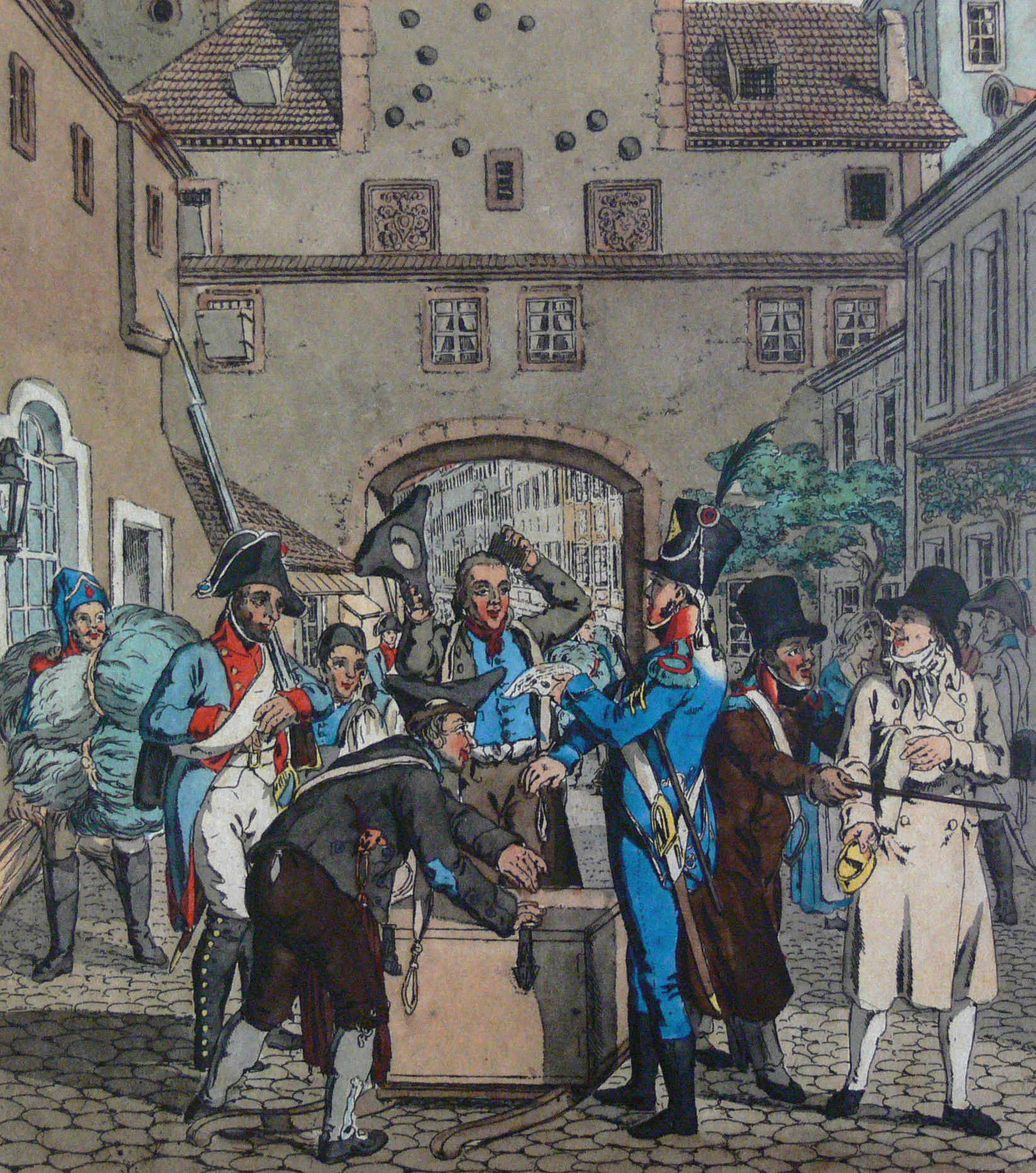
French troops inspecting goods for British contraband in Leipzig in 1806

When France and the United Kingdom signed the Treaty of Amiens in March 1802, confirming French possession of Belgium and the port of Antwerp, the Empire achieved true global power status, both commercially and politically. However, peace was broken after William Pitt the Younger returned to power, organized the Third Coalition, and declared war on France. The British fleet decisively defeated the French navy at the Battle of Trafalgar, confirming its control of the seas. Hailed as the "savior of Europe," Pitt remarked: "England has saved itself through its efforts and, I hope, will save Europe by its example."

Napoleon, recognizing the impossibility of maritime confrontation, shifted strategy. As stated in a letter to his brother Louis, King of Holland, he aimed to "reconquer the colonies by land" and "defeat the sea by land," preventing the United Kingdom and its allies from trading with the rest of Europe. To this end, he implemented the Continental System, initiated by the Berlin Decree in November 1806. Its purpose was to "exacerbate England's difficulties [...] (believing) it is more important to impoverish than to starve it," given that since the wars of the First Coalition, the United Kingdom had been the main financier of France's enemies.

The decree, signed on November 21, 1806, and published in the Journal Officiel on December 5, formalized a de facto situation. Earlier that year, the estuaries of the Ems, Weser, and Elbe rivers, as well as French ports, had already been closed to British imports, effectively blocking all British goods from entering Germany. Napoleon's decree sought to extend this blockade formally to the entire Empire, its allies, and occupied nations.

=== Contributions of European economies to Napoleon's war effort ===
The exploitation of nations and regions conquered by France began in the late 1790s, notably under General Bonaparte's leadership in Italy, well before he became Consul or Emperor.

==== War indemnities and financial oversight ====
The imposition of war indemnities and contributions on defeated nations became institutionalized during the Austrian campaign of 1805. On October 21, an order from Elchingen dictated that war contributions would be collected for the army's benefit, with army inspectors tasked with overseeing this collection. On November 14, Berthier, acting on Napoleon's orders, appointed Daru to lead the Austrian administration with the powers of a Finance, Interior, and Military Minister for the occupied country. Napoleon imposed a war contribution of 100 million francs, with assessments conducted to determine each region's financial capacity.

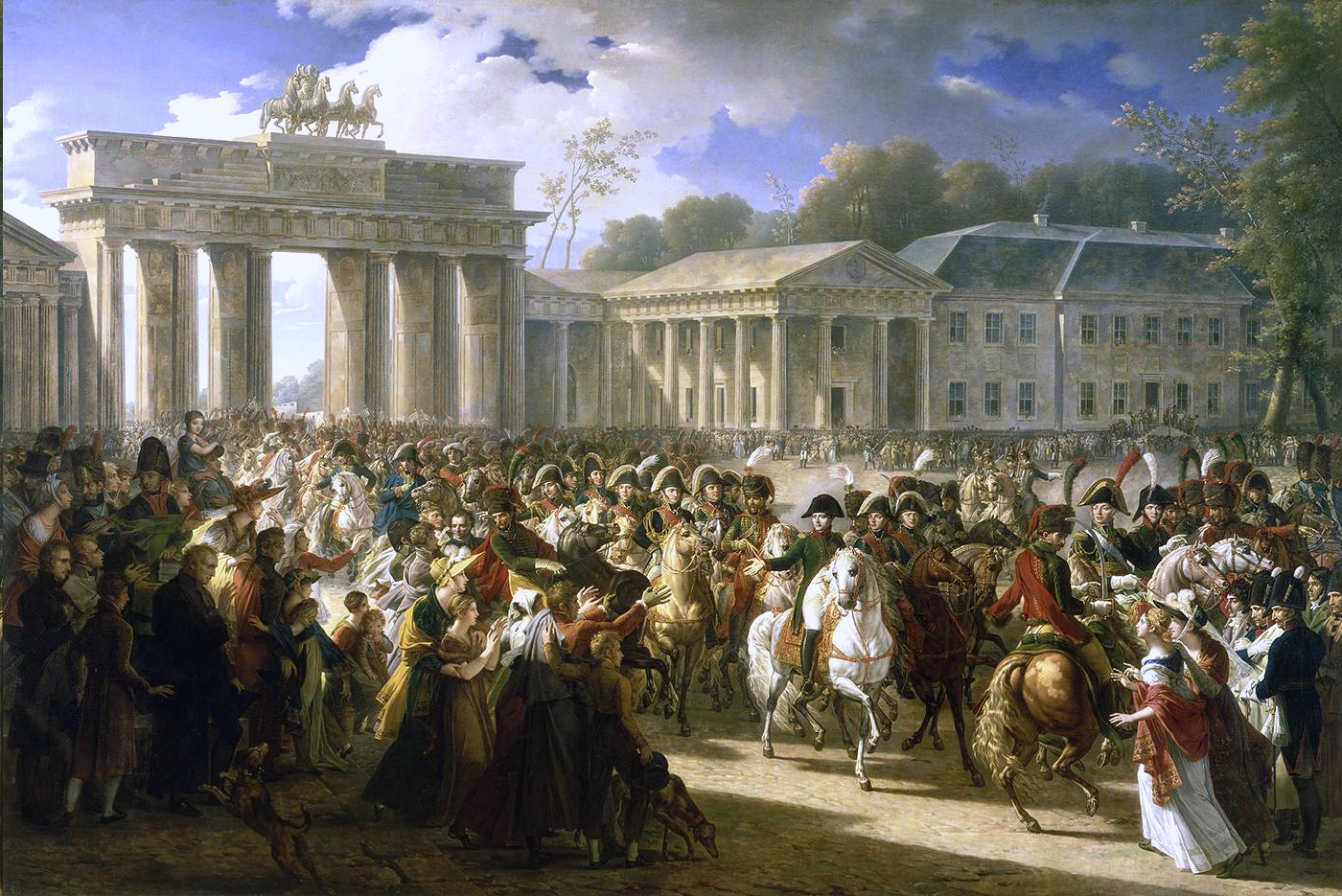
The Grand Army parading in Berlin. Oil on canvas by Charles Meynier.

After the Prussian defeat in the 1806 lightning campaign, Prussia was similarly required to pay a war indemnity of 120 million francs, enforced through military occupation. By decree on October 19, Daru became general intendant of the army and director of administration for conquered territories. In Berlin, he discovered 800,000 francs in public coffers. Prussia was divided into four departments, each managed by a general finance administrator under Daru's authority. The French seized public assets, took control of mines and saltworks, and oversaw the collection of taxes, both ordinary and extraordinary. (Note: Installations for extracting salt by heating brine or by evaporation on timber walls filled with small bundles along which salt-laden water flows, as in Bad Kreuznach.)

In 1809, Napoleon, determined to bring Austria to its knees – a nation that had been at war with France since 1792 and had just been defeated by him for the second time – imposed rigorous peace terms on the Habsburg Empire through the Treaty of Vienna. These terms included a reduction in Austria's armed forces, the cession of territories to France and its Russian ally, and the payment of a hefty war indemnity of 85 million francs. Of this sum, 30 million was to be paid before Vienna's evacuation, with the remainder settled via promissory notes to be paid monthly: 4 million for each of the first five months and 6 million for each subsequent month, starting in January 1810. Additionally, Austria was compelled to adhere to "the prohibitive system adopted by France and Russia against England", thereby forcing the Austrians to join the Continental System imposed by Napoleon against the United Kingdom.

In 1806, Pierre Daru had been appointed Intendant General of the conquered territories, assisted in this role by Louis Pierre Édouard Bignon, who served as Imperial Commissioner to the Prussian authorities and was responsible for the general administration of the domains and finances of the provinces conquered in 1806. Bignon was recalled to Vienna in 1809 to assist Daru once again, as Napoleon intended "to employ the same men as in Berlin to benefit from their experience and to ease the establishment of a provisional administration."

At the beginning of July, "Napoleon summoned Daru to his headquarters to inform him that Austria's war contribution would be set at 200,000,000 francs (double the amount from 1805)." (Note: It was considerably reduced after the signing of the peace treaty and the marriage of Napoleon to Marie-Louise of Austria.) This contribution was determined after an assessment of the provinces' ability to pay. On July 12, an armistice was signed. Daru took control of Austrian stores and revenues, with Napoleon advising him to be "inflexible."

As contributions were not coming in as expected, Napoleon threatened to confiscate everything. Daru was tasked with reviving the lottery, overseeing stamp duties, and selling salt, tobacco, and timber. By the end of September, only a quarter of the contributions had been collected. Finally, on October 14, peace was signed. Austria agreed to pay 30 million in cash, while Daru continued to liquidate whatever assets he could. Austria also committed to paying 50 million in promissory notes, and France took possession of Illyria.

==== Spoils of war ====
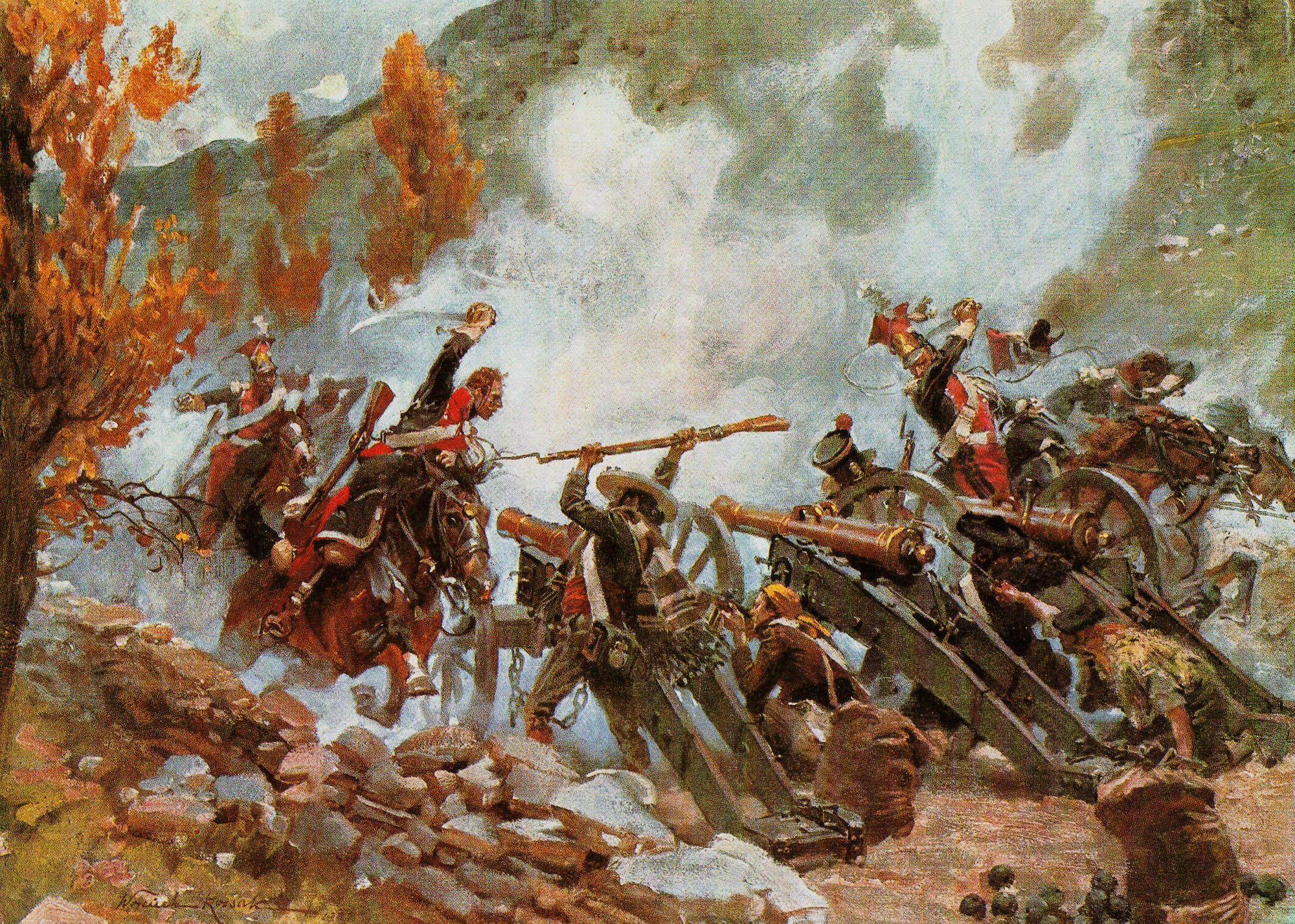
Polish Light Horse of the Guard capturing enemy cannons at the Battle of Somosierra. Enemy artillery pieces were valuable war prizes for Napoleon's armies.

"(Citizen Songis) will empty the warehouses of all Austrian rifles and send them to Mantua, except for 1,500 that he will retain for the defense of the fortification. He will place all Venetian rifles suitable for our infantry in the army depot's warehouse. These must be kept in good condition and reserved for arming the army, with Palmanova as the main depot."

During the Consulate, when it was decided to reform the Gribeauval artillery system following a report by the "Artillery Committee," the 4- and 8-caliber pieces were replaced with intermediate 6-caliber pieces. Beyond the technical improvements, industrial streamlining, and purely military advantages of this reform, it also had the benefit of allowing "the enormous quantity of 6-caliber munitions seized from the Austrians to be used, resulting in savings."

In addition to cannons, horses were particularly prized spoils of war. During the 1809 campaign, 2,000 horses were taken from the Austrians – almost enough to fully remount two cavalry regiments.

Alongside the loot taken during operations, the seizure of military supplies, weapons, and horses was also part of the war contributions imposed on defeated nations. For instance, in 1805, Austria was forced to supply the French armies with 200,000 pairs of shoes, 2,000 pairs of boots, 6,000 dragoon horses, and 6,000 saddles. "After the capture of Vienna, artillerymen found more than 2,000 cannons in the city's arsenal." At the end of the 1806 Prussian campaign, 10,000 rifles or carbines, 12,000 to 13,000 pistols, and 27,000 sabers were seized from the Berlin arsenal. "After the victory at Jena, Prussian strongholds, especially Magdeburg, would deliver stocks of artillery pieces that enriched the Emperor's artillery park."

==== Mobilization of local resources ====
Following the French conquests, new imperial weapon factories were established in annexed territories, such as in Liège, Turin – which produced French-standard arms for the French army and Napoleon's Italian troops – and in Culembourg in the Netherlands.

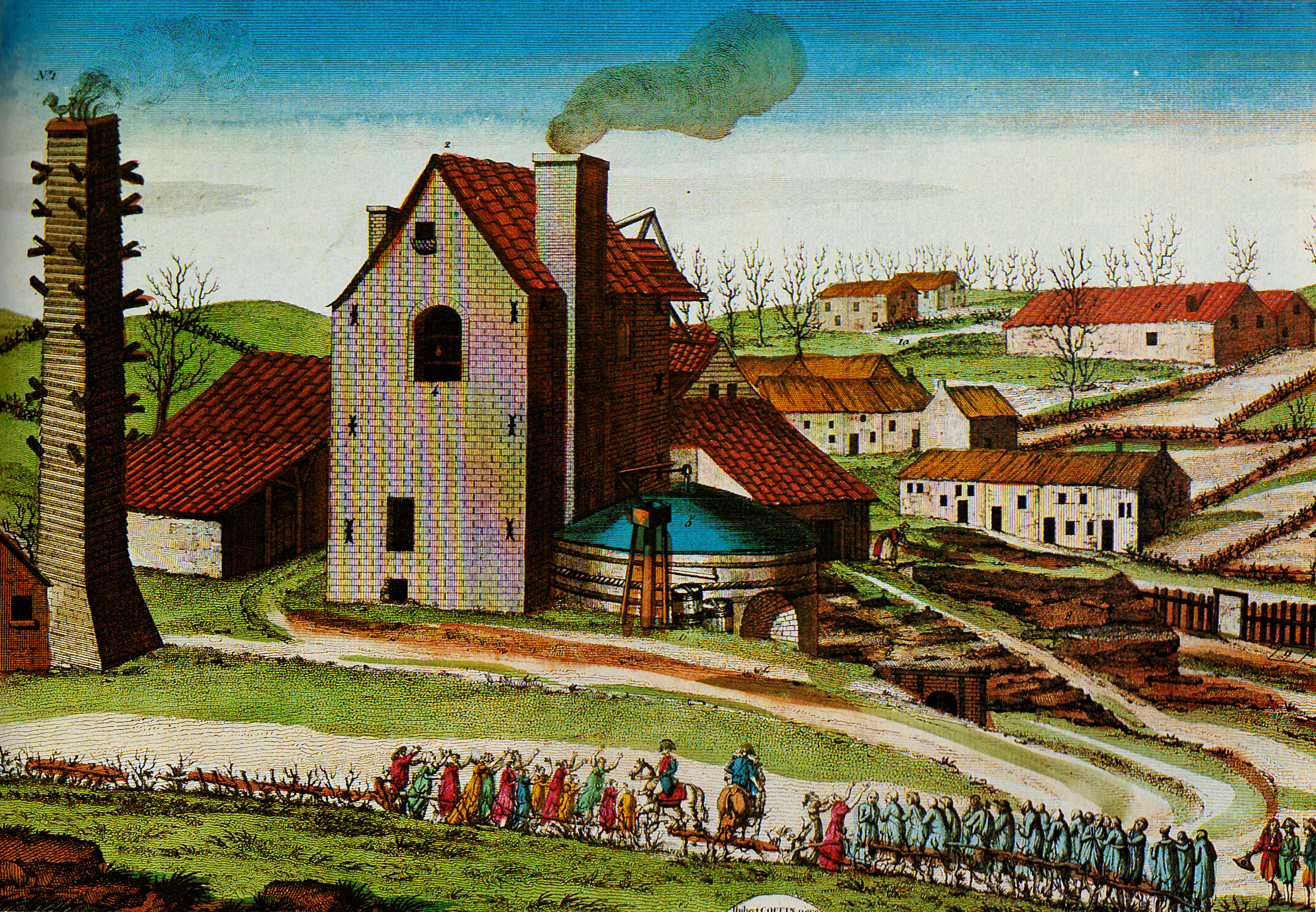
The Beaujonc mine near Liège in March 1812.

In the "united departments" (Belgium), the armorers of Liège had long been renowned throughout Europe for their expertise, and they were the first Europeans integrated into France's "military economy," which was still under the republican regime at the time. With the rise of the Empire, "Napoleon, constantly at war with all of Europe, encouraged Belgian industry because its products were incorporated into his war economy. As a result, the needs of the armies led to significant orders" in the making of military uniforms, leatherworking, wheelwrighting, and cannon foundries. For its part, "the Liège weapons factory was ordered to send 27,000 rifles annually to the army." As for the Liège cannon foundry, under the Consulate and Empire, it "produced around 7,000 guns of all calibers, both for the navy and for coastal batteries." In 1808, the "Statistical Survey of the Department of Ourthe" provided various financial and economic details about the foundry: the workforce consisted of 113 people, the expenses amounted to 472,682 francs and 90 centimes, of which 258,888 francs and 67 centimes were allocated for the purchase of cast iron and steel, and the production consisted of 560 cannons and carronades weighing a total of 1,210,717 kilograms, yielding 738,537 francs and 37 centimes.

The economic and logistical resources of the occupied countries were also mobilized. "The remount was partially done in Germany through war captures, purchases, or requisitions, starting from 1805." Defeated at the end of the 1806 campaign, occupied Prussia was forced to "supply the Emperor with provisions, cannons, rifles, ammunition, horses, etc., enough to 'sustain an army during a campaign.'" The 1809 Treaty of Schönbrunn stipulated "that the French army would take (from Austria) what its stores could not supply for the troops' food."

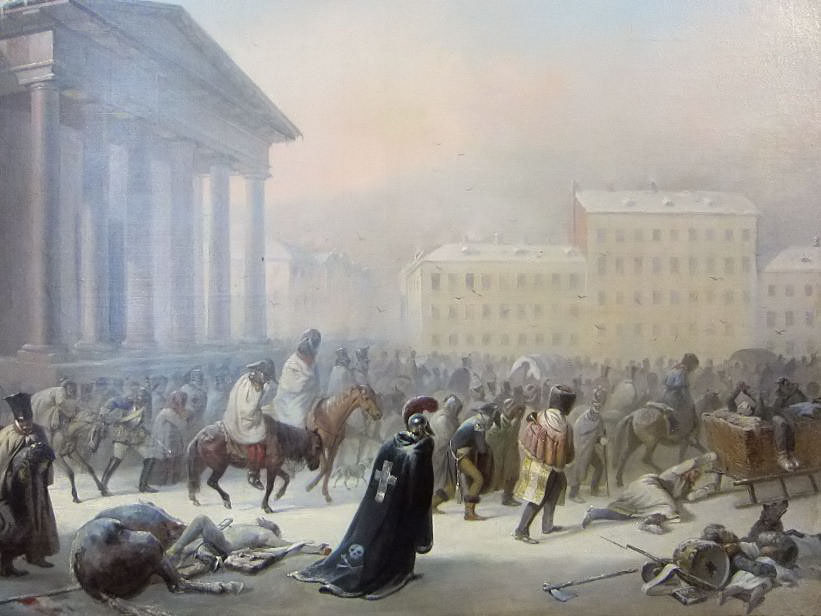
The remains of the Grande Armée in Vilnius. The starving soldiers will plunder the city's stores and it will take all of Daru's skill in early 1813 to reconstitute an army from the ragged debris of the retreat from Russia.

At the start of 1813, it was the resources of East Prussia that were mobilized by Daru to feed and re-equip the remnants of the Grand Army following the disastrous Russian retreat, thereby abundantly supplying the fortresses of Stettin, Custrin, Glogau, and even Spandau, with "millions of rations of flour, rice, salt, and brandy, hundreds of thousands of rations of biscuits, salted beef, wine, hay, straw, and oats, with the purchase of 32,000 horses being concluded" for the cavalry remount and train services. During the campaign against the Sixth Coalition, which would begin in the spring, resources from all of Germany were called upon. Daru arrived in Mainz on April 11, 1813; he was to have 50,000 quintals of flour and 300,000 rations of biscuits delivered. In June, the fortress of Dresden became the central point for the distribution of resources: biscuits would be made there using flour from Erfurt and Magdeburg; each corps was supplied with twenty days of biscuits and ten days of flour. In July, Daru set up stores in several German cities, but by September 13, the Emperor complained to him about the lack of provisions and asked him to place contracts. "The country, in fact, had been 'exhausted' for six months, with armies roaming through it."

== Economic consequences for France of the Napoleonic Wars ==
The war effort led to the emergence of a class of opportunistic businessmen who enriched themselves by supplying the armies, but it also caused continuous public finance deficits from 1811 to 1815. These deficits were primarily the result of the accumulation of arrears: in 1811, for example, 3 million francs were still outstanding from the 1806 fiscal year and six million from the 1808 fiscal year. As prices remained relatively stable, these deficits seem to have resulted from increased public spending, "and obviously, it was the war expenditures that led to this increase in total spending [...] which nearly doubled over seven years." The defeat of 1815 also had financial consequences: under the terms of the Treaty of Paris, France was forced to pay the victorious allied belligerents more than 700 million gold francs, the highest war indemnity ever paid by a nation, relative to its Gross Domestic Product, according to the economic historian François Crouzet. (Note: In addition to this indemnity (701,744,335 francs), France had to pay repair costs for the damages caused and occupation costs (589,138,195 francs). Added to these war-related amounts were 777,300,323 francs of arrears from the Empire, totaling over 2 billion francs of budgetary burdens, which in 1815 represented the State's budget for three years. The indemnity, repair, and occupation costs were settled through loans (the stock market was almost non-existent, and French banks that survived the Revolution and the Empire were not accustomed to transactions with the State). The first loans were taken out between 1816 and 1817 by foreign bankers (Sartoris, a French banker based in London; Hope, of Amsterdam; and Baring, his father-in-law, of London) and then by bankers based in Paris (Hottinguer, Laffitte, Greffulhe, Rothschild, Delessert...), gradually replacing the foreign bankers. A public loan was launched in 1818, to which savers responded with ten times its amount: "For 14.6 million francs in annuities offered to cover the loan, 163 million were requested: money was not lacking, but it was hoarded and not oriented towards productive investment to support industrial growth, due to a non-existent banking network, the lack of suitable legal instruments to attract private savings (joint-stock companies), and a stock exchange limited to annuity trading." Buoyed by this confidence, the annuity offered by the State regained favor with the public and bankers; the State restored its credit among savers, both national and international, and could pit banks against one another to borrow at the lowest cost.Gallais-Hamonno, Georges, ed. (2007). "Chapitre 2. Le marché obligataire" [Chapter 2. The bond market]. Le marché financier français au XIXe siècle, volume 2. Aspects quantitatifs des acteurs et des instruments à la Bourse de Paris [The French financial market in the 19th century, volume 2. Quantitative aspects of actors and instruments on the Paris Stock Exchange] (in French). Paris: Publications de la Sorbonne. ISBN 978-2-85944-574-4.)

Although the Napoleonic wars contributed to various technical advances, industrial production rationalization, and the rise of "capitalists" due to the protectionism of the Continental System, which provided markets for French companies and annexed provinces, France had not yet entered the Industrial Revolution, in contrast to Britain, where it began. By the end of the Empire, the French economy remained largely dependent on agriculture, with the secondary sector still made up of artisans and factories operating in the manner of the Ancien Régime.

== War profiteers ==
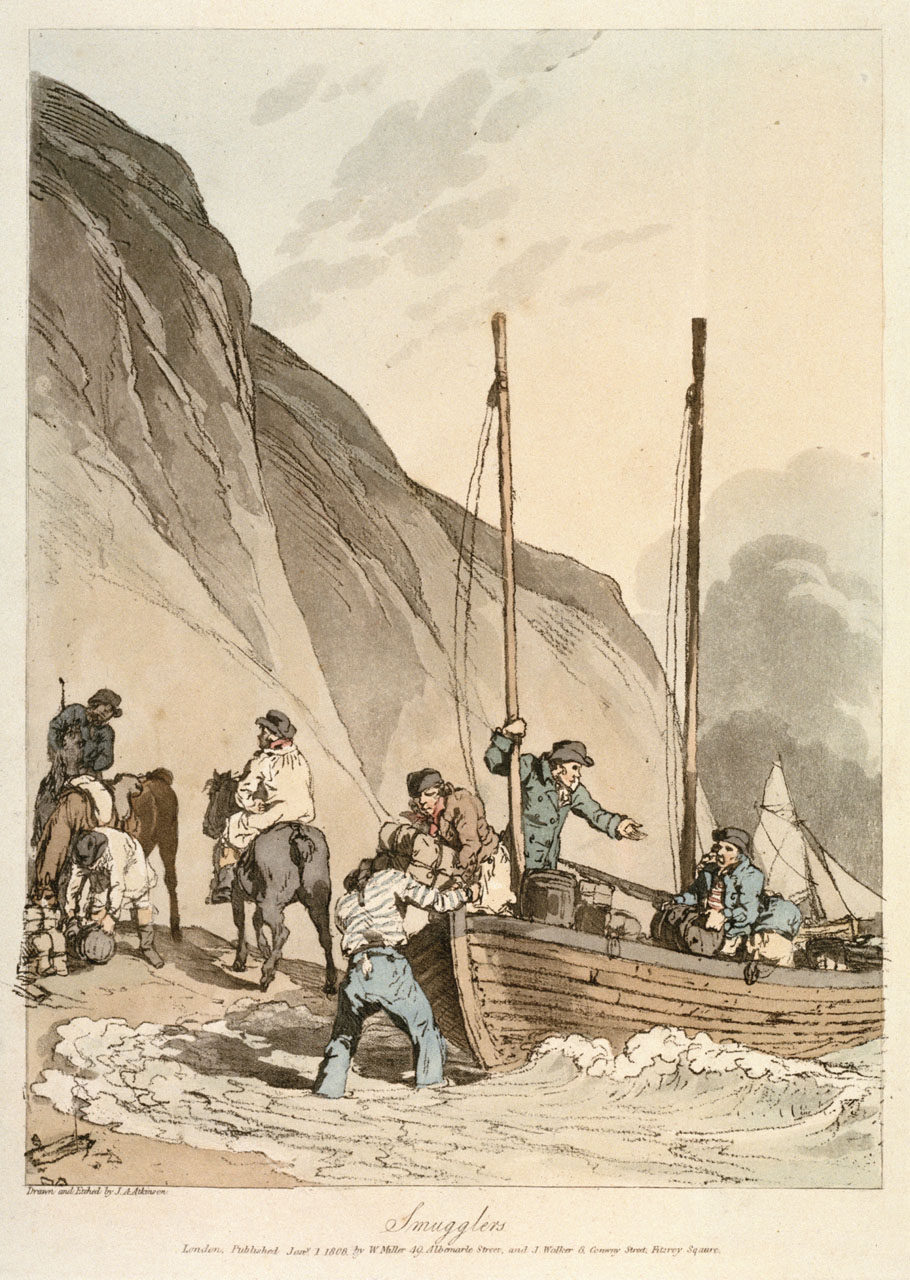
1808 engraving of British smugglers working against the Continental System

The wars of the Revolution, Consulate, and Empire saw the emergence of a "class" of businessmen enriched by supplying the armies or by smuggling British goods, a practice that spread across all the coasts of Europe, from Dunkirk to Danzig. This class became part of the bourgeoisie in post-7 July 1815 Europe, after Napoleon's second abdication.

Until the complete militarization of logistics and supply services and the adoption of legal frameworks for public procurement in the 19th century, the supply of goods and even services (logistical transportation) to the armies was handled through "submissions" – open bids aimed at getting the best price – or direct orders, often distorted by privileged relationships or influence, and sometimes marred by corruption, notably due to the absence or inadequacy of specifications or collusion between public officials and private suppliers. One example of such unorthodox practices is the Versailles weapons factory, a "state factory" that Bonaparte, as First Consul, gave to Nicolas-Noël Boutet on September 1, 1800, for 18 years, with the guarantee of an annual order.

These failures or irregularities became a source of enrichment for many "war profiteers" during the Revolution and the Empire, with history particularly noting the name of Gabriel-Julien Ouvrard among them. Arrested for the first time in 1800 on suspicion of accounting fraud, he was arrested again in 1809 for unpaid debts and later sentenced to three years in prison for attempting to negotiate a secret peace with Britain to end the Continental System, which was damaging to business. However, this did not prevent him from remaining one of the main suppliers to the army, serving as the general munitions supplier during the Hundred Days after having already held this position for the Basque Army in April 1813. One of the major scandals associated with his name was the supply of fake leather shoes with cardboard soles just before the Russian campaign.

== Assessment ==
Regarding the management of the needs, resources, and supplies of the French armies, the Napoleonic era saw these forces initially liberating themselves from the services of civilian contractors in the transport sector through the establishment of military train services. The reorganization of administrative and supply-related services (such as war commissioners) laid the groundwork for the creation of a dedicated logistics service. This culminated in the formation of the military logistics corps by Louis XVIII through an ordinance on July 29, 1817. This new entity unified "war commissioners" and "review inspectors" into a single service "which henceforth combined the functions of controller and supplier."

However, despite these reforms, the managerial rigor of figures like Petiet and Daru, Napoleon's personal involvement in organizing these tasks and missions, and the mobilization of all available economic resources, the logistics of Napoleonic armies continued to suffer from serious shortcomings. These deficiencies were often at the root of significant military setbacks. The disaster of 1812 is undoubtedly the most striking example: aware of the logistical challenges posed by the Russian campaign, "Napoleon made massive preparations for storage facilities. He amassed substantial food supplies and ammunition at Danzig, Glogau, Küstrin, and Stettin. The transport services were expanded, and he ordered that troops carry provisions for 24 days with them. Ironically, this turned out to be his greatest failure, and despite all these meticulous preparations, the supply system collapsed." By 1814, national guards defending Paris were armed only with simple pikes.

The weapon systems adopted during the Empire (artillery, rifles, etc.) remained in service until the July Monarchy. For example, the "Model An IX rifle" was only replaced about twenty years later by the "Model 1822," which was essentially a redesigned version of its predecessor. (Note: A first modified version of the An IX model, improved at the level of the plate to reduce firing incidents, was put into service under the Restoration in 1816.)

The Napoleonic era, marked almost continuously by a state of war for ten years (1805–1815), did not see the emergence of a "military-industrial complex," as the state of development of French industry did not allow it. For instance, the Versailles Arms Manufacture, established during the Revolution, ceased operations in 1818. In fact, until the 1850s, the production of military weapons remained predominantly "artisanal," with manufacturing facilities resembling a collection of dispersed workshops rather than a single "factory" with centralized production and assembly lines.

== See also ==
- Continental System
- Grande Armée
- War economy
- Napoleonic looting of art

== Bibliography ==
=== Historical documents ===
- Ministre de la guerre (1876a). Correspondance militaire de Napoléon Ier, t. 1 [Military correspondence of Napoleon I, vol. 1] (in French). Paris: E. Plon.
- Ministre de la guerre (1876b). Correspondance militaire de Napoléon Ier, t. 4 [Military Correspondence of Napoleon I, vol. 4] (in French). Paris: E. Plon.
- Ministre de la guerre (1876c). Correspondance militaire de Napoléon Ier, t. 9 [Military Correspondence of Napoleon I, vol. 9] (in French). Paris: E. Plon.
- Ministre de la guerre (1858). Correspondance de Napoléon Ier, t. 21 [Correspondence of Napoleon I, vol. 21] (in French). Paris: H. Plon.
- Monge, Gaspard (1794). Description de l'art de fabriquer des canons [Description of the art of making cannons] (in French). Paris: Imprimerie du Comité de Salut Public.
- L'imprimerie impériale (1810). Bulletin des lois de la République française [Bulletin of the laws of the French Republic] (in French). Paris: Imprimerie impériale.

=== Financial aspects ===
- Gabillard, Jean (1953). "Le financement des guerres napoléoniennes et la conjoncture du Premier Empire" [Financing the Napoleonic Wars and the situation of the First Empire]. Revue économique (in French). 4 (4): 548–72.
- Branda, Pierre (2005). "Les finances et le budget de la France napoléonienne : la guerre a-t-elle payé la guerre ?" [The Finances and Budget of Napoleonic France: Did War Pay for War?]. Revue du Souvenir Napoléonien (in French). 457: 25–34.

=== Continental System ===
- Branda, Pierre (2007). "Les conséquences économiques du blocus continental" [The economic consequences of the continental blockade]. Revue du Souvenir Napoléonien (in French). 472: 21–30.
- Crouzet, François (1964). "Wars, blockade, and economic change in Europe : 1792–1815". Journal of Economic History. 24 (4): 567–88. doi:10.1017/S0022050700061271. JSTOR 2115762.
- Hague, William (2005). William Pitt the Younger. Londres: Harper Perennial. p. 652. ISBN 978-0-00-714720-5.

=== Economic policy ===
- d'Ivernois, Francis (1814). Napoléon, administrateur et financier [Napoleon, administrator and financier] (in French). Paris: J.J. Paschoud Libraire.
- Brun, Jean-François (1993). L'économie militaire impériale à l'épreuve de la VIe coalition [The Imperial Military Economy Put to the Test by the Sixth Coalition]. Thèse de doctorat, A.N.R.T., Université de Lille III (Thesis) (in French).

=== Industry ===
- Cotty, Hermann (1806). Mémoire sur la fabrication des armes portatives de guerre [Memoir on the manufacture of portable war weapons] (in French). Magimel: Libraire pour l'art militaire.
- Mortal, Patrick (2007). Les armuriers de l'État : du Grand siècle à la globalisation, 1665–1989 [State Gunsmiths: From the Grand Siècle to Globalization, 1665–1989] (in French). Villeneuve-d'Ascq: Les Presses Universitaires du Septentrion. p. 489. ISBN 978-2-85939-991-7.
- Bennani, Maya; Decrock, Bruno; Griot, François; Marasi, Julien (2009). Patrimoine industriel des Ardennes [Industrial heritage of the Ardennes] (in French). Langres: Éditions Dominique Guéniot. p. 288. ISBN 978-2-87825-458-7.

=== Horses in the armies ===
- Bogros, Denis (1999). Histoire du cheval de troupe de la cavalerie française 1515–1918 [History of the French Cavalry Troop Horse 1515–1918] (in French). Revue historique des armées.
- Brun, Jean-François (2007). "Le cheval dans la Grande Armée" [The horse in the Grand Army]. Revue historique des armée (in French). 249 (4): 38–74. doi:10.3917/rha.249.0038a.
- Martin, Roger (1994). "Les chevaux sous le Premier empire" [Horses under the First Empire]. Revue du Souvenir Napoléonien (in French). 395: 31–41.

=== Army commissary in the field ===
- Pigeard, Alain (1996). "Le service des vivres dans les armées du premier empire (1804–1815)" [The food service in the armies of the First Empire (1804–1815)]. Annales historiques de la Révolution française (in French). 303: 144–47. doi:10.3406/ahrf.1996.3426.
- Meigner, François-Xavier (2012). L'alimentation du soldat pendant la campagne de 1812 [The soldier's diet during the 1812 campaign] (in French). Fondation Napoléon.

=== Varia ===
- Bergerot, Bernard (1991). "Daru, intendant général de la Grande Armée" [Daru, general quartermaster of the Grand Army]. Bibliothèque Napoléonienne Tallandier (in French): 220. ISBN 978-2-235-02040-4.
- Lévy, Arthur (1929). Un grand profiteur de guerre sous la Révolution [A great war profiteer during the Revolution] (in French). Paris: G.-J. Ouvrard.
- Lachouque, Henry (1972). Waterloo 1815 (in French). Éditions Stock.
- Funcken, Liliane; Funcken, Fred (1968). Les uniformes et les armes des soldats du Premier Empire : des régiments de ligne français aux troupes britanniques, prussiennes et espagnoles, t. 1 [The uniforms and weapons of the soldiers of the First Empire: from French line regiments to British, Prussian and Spanish troops, vol. 1] (in French). Casterman. p. 157. ISBN 978-2-203-14305-0.
- Funcken, Liliane; Funcken, Fred (1969). Les uniformes et les armes des soldats du Premier Empire : des régiments de ligne français aux troupes britanniques, prussiennes et espagnoles, t. 2 [The uniforms and weapons of the soldiers of the First Empire: from French line regiments to British, Prussian and Spanish troops, vol. 2] (in French). Casterman. p. 157. ISBN 978-2-203-14306-7.
- Pacaud, Fabien (2010). Du cœur des volcans au fracas des combats : La compagnie de Réserve départementale du Puy-de-Dôme 1805–1814 [From the heart of the volcanoes to the roar of combat: The Puy-de-Dôme Departmental Reserve Company 1805–1814] (in French). Fondation Napoléon.
- Collectif (1993). "Le Premier Empire" [The First Empire]. Axis l'univers documentaire Hachette : Innocent VII à névrodermite [Axis the Hachette documentary universe: Innocent VII with neurodermatitis] (in French). Vol. 4. Paris: Hachette. pp. 28–33. ISBN 978-2-245-02704-2.
- Carrot, Georges (2001). La Garde nationale (1789–1871) : Une force publique ambiguë [The National Guard (1789–1871): An ambiguous public force] (in French). Paris/Montréal (Québec)/Budapest: Éditions de l'Harmattan. p. 364. ISBN 978-2-7475-0127-9.
- Ouvrard, Robert (2009). 1809, les Français à Vienne [1809, the French in Vienna] (in French). Paris: Nouveau Monde Éditions. p. 336. ISBN 978-2-84736-402-6.
