= Timeline of the War of 1812 =

Timeline of the War of 1812 is a chronology of the War of 1812, including a list of battles.

== Origins ==
Year	Day	Theater	Occurrence	Notes
1803	May 18	prelude	Britain declared war on Napoleonic France	Conflict would grow out to War of the Third Coalition.
1803	Jul 4	diplomacy	Louisiana Purchase	Napoleon sold French Louisiana to the U.S. Britain supported deal, hoping to keep U.S. neutral.
1804	Nov 3	prelude	Quashquame's treaty with William Henry Harrison	Many Sauk allied with British instead.
1805	May 22	prelude	Essex Decision	England's admiralty court decided seizing certain U.S. merchant ships was legal, escalating tensions.
1805	Oct 21	prelude	Battle of Trafalgar	Major British victory over France
1806	Apr 18	prelude	Non-importation Act	U.S. embargo on importation of certain British goods, in retaliation of the Essex Decision.
1806	Nov 21	prelude	Berlin Decree	Napoleon imposed trade blockade of British Isles.
1806	Dec 31	prelude	Monroe-Pinkney Treaty signed.	Intended to stop British impressment of U.S. ships, but President Thomas Jefferson rejected it.
1807	Jun 22	prelude	Chesapeake–Leopard affair	Military and diplomatic naval incident, nearly triggering war between Britain and the U.S.
1807	Nov 11	prelude	Orders in Council	Britain launched economic warfare against France, straining relations with neutral countries.
1807	Dec 17	prelude	Milan Decree	Napoleon ordered seizing all ships from neutral countries trading with the British.
1807	Dec 22	prelude	Embargo Act	U.S. act in retaliation against British and French seizure and impressment of U.S. merchant ships.
1808	Apr 17	prelude	Bayonne decree	France began seizing all U.S. ships in French ports.
1809	Mar 1	prelude	Non-Intercourse Act	U.S. act lifting embargoes on all shipping, except those bound for British and French ports.
1809	Mar 4	prelude	President James Madison's inauguration.	
1809	Apr 19	prelude	Erskine Agreement	
1809	Sep 30	prelude	Treaty of Fort Wayne	U.S.–Shawnee tensions lead to Tecumseh's War.
1810	Mar 23	prelude	Rambouillet Decree	France orders seizing all U.S. ships in French ports.
1810	May 1	prelude	Macon's Bill No. 2	U.S. act intended to compel Britain and France to stop seizing U.S. ships.
1810	Aug 5	prelude	Cadore letter	
1811	Feb 2	prelude	Trade with the United Kingdom closed	
1811	Mar 10	prelude	Henry letters	Fabricated letters caused diplomatic incident.
1811	May 16	prelude	Little Belt affair	Military and diplomatic naval incident, nearly triggering war between Britain and the U.S.
1811	Nov 4	prelude	12th United States Congress convened.	
1811	Nov 7	prelude	Battle of Tippecanoe	Tecumseh's confederacy defeated.
1812	Apr 4	prelude	American Trade Embargo	
1812	May 11	prelude	UK Prime Minister Spencer Perceval assassinated.	Pro-war sentiment in Britain decreased, and efforts were made to reconcile with the U.S.
1812	Jun 1	prelude	President James Madison's war message	Madison requested the U.S. Congress to declare war.
1812	Jun 8	prelude	Robert Jenkinson became UK Prime Minister	Some measures to avert war were tried, but they were too little, too late.
1812	Jun 16	prelude	Castlereagh announced repeal of Orders in Council	News reached U.S. Congress too late to impact U.S. declaration of war on the UK.

== War ==
=== Theaters ===
The War of 1812 was fought in four major theaters: (Note: Most of the information in this list has been extracted from Robert Malcomson's "Historical Dictionary of the War of 1812," augmented in some cases by information from other Wikipedia articles and from John Mahon's "The War of 1812.")

1. the Atlantic Coast (including the Chesapeake campaign);
2. the Gulf Coast;
3. the Mississippi River; and
4. the Canada–US border. Actions along the Canada–US border occurred in three sectors (from east to west):

- the St. Lawrence River and Lake Ontario, including its tributary Richelieu River in Quebec, and Lake Champlain in Vermont and Upstate New York. (The U.S. side of this front is known as New England, and the Canadian side as Lower Canada and Upper Canada).
- the Niagara Frontier; and
- the Great Lakes region (the U.S. side of which is also known as the Old Northwest, and the Canadian side as Upper Canada), excluding the aforementioned Niagara Frontier and Lake Ontario.

There were also numerous naval battles at sea, almost all of them in the Atlantic.

In between, numerous events occurred in the areas of diplomacy, and the home fronts (internal politics) of all parties involved. For the United Kingdom in particular, the dynamics of the French invasion of Russia (June–December 1812) and the War of the Sixth Coalition against Napoleon (March 1813 – May 1814) in Europe significantly impacted the resources they had available for the War of 1812 with the United States, and their willingness to conduct peace negotiations (which would eventually be held in Ghent, August–December 1814, on territory the Sixth Coalition had just occupied from the First French Empire). For the United States, the Creek War was an important side conflict to increase their control in the South at the expense of Native American factions allied with and supplied by the British, while the Hartford Convention of the Federalist Party (December 1814 – January 1815) played a significant role in voicing strong opposition to the U.S. government's war policy.

=== 1812 ===
Year	Day	Theater	Occurrence	Notes
1812	Jun 18	diplomacy	U.S. declaration of war on UK	
1812	Jun 22	home front	1812 Baltimore riots began	
1812	Jun 23	diplomacy	Finalized Repeal of Orders in Council	
1812	Jun 26	St. Lawrence River	Occurrence at Carleton Island	Four U.S. civilians captured a British sergeant and three privates of the 10th Royal Veteran Battalion on Carleton Island, the first POWs of the war.
1812	Jun 29	St. Lawrence River	Brits capture schooners Sophia and Island Packet	
1812	Jul 1	diplomacy	United States doubled customs duties	
1812	Jul 2	Great Lakes region	Capture of the Cuyahoga Packet	On the Detroit River, Canadian Provincial Marines under Frédérick Rolette captured U.S. merchant schooner Cuyahoga Packet, containing valuable U.S. military intelligence of William Hull (unaware that war had been declared).
1812	Jul 12– Aug 8	Great Lakes region	Hull's Detroit River campaign	Failed attempt by U.S. general William Hull to invade Upper Canada across the Detroit River at Sandwich. U.S. forces did not capture Fort Amherstburg, and withdrew to Detroit at the news of British reinforcements.
1812	Jul 16	Great Lakes region	Battle of River Canard	
1812	Jul 17	Great Lakes region	Siege of Fort Mackinac	Bloodless capture of Fort Mackinac on Mackinac Island by British regulars, 200 fur traders and 400 Native warriors.
1812	Jul 17	naval	USS Nautilus versus HMS Shannon	The American brig Nautilus was pursued and captured by the British frigate Shannon off the coast of New Jersey.
1812	Jul 19	St. Lawrence River	First Battle of Sacket's Harbor, New York	Failed British naval attack on U.S. naval base Sackets Harbor.
1812	Jul 31	St. Lawrence River	Julia versus Earl of Moria and Duke of Gloucester	Standoff between U.S. schooner Julia and two larger British ships. Both sides retired after a three-hour exchange of fire off Elizabethtown, New York.
1812	Aug 5	Great Lakes region	Battle of Brownstown	Minor British victory (including 25 warriors under Tecumseh), ambushing 200 Ohio militiamen at Brownstown, Michigan Territory.
1812	Aug 8	Great Lakes region	Isaac Brock embarked at Port Dover.	British attempt to relieve Amherstburg, besieged by Americans.
1812	Aug 9	Great Lakes region	Battle of Maguaga	Minor U.S. military victory in Michigan Territory, when U.S. troops tried to reopen the supply line between Frenchtown (present-day Monroe) and Detroit was ambushed by British regulars and Tecumseh's native warriors.
1812	Aug 13	naval	USS Essex versus HMS Alert	Battle off the Azores in which British sloop Alert surrendered to U.S. frigate Essex after an 8-minute engagement.
1812	Aug 15	Great Lakes region	Battle of Fort Dearborn	Massacre of U.S. soldiers and civilians carried out by Potawatomi and Menominee warriors, after Hull ordered the evacuation of Fort Dearborn (Illinois Territory, at present-day Chicago) upon learning the British had captured Fort Mackinac.
1812	Aug 15–16	Great Lakes region	Siege of Detroit	Significant U.S. setback. Hull surrendered Detroit (Michigan Territory) without a fight, despite having a larger force that his opponent Isaac Brock.
1812	Aug 19	naval	USS Constitution versus HMS Guerrière	After battling fewer than 3 hours c. 500 miles southeast of Newfoundland, British frigate HMS Guerriere surrendered to U.S. frigate USS Constitution.
1812	Aug 19	Mississippi River	The Great Louisiana hurricane struck New Orleans	Both the U.S. and the British fleet damaged.
1812	Sep 3	Great Lakes region	Massacre at Pigeon Roost, Indiana Territory	Kickapoo warriors raided a small settlement, c. 100 miles south of present-day Indianapolis, Indiana.
1812	Sep 4–15	Great Lakes region	Siege of Fort Harrison, Indiana Territory	A large party of Kickapoo, Miami, Potawatomi, Shawnee and Winnebago warriors from Prophetstown, Indiana Territory attacked the U.S. fort (located on the Wabash River just north of present-day Terre Haute, Indiana) defended by about 60 U.S. soldiers under Zachary Taylor. The Natives withdrew when U.S. reinforcements arrived.
1812	Sep 5–12	Mississippi River	First siege of Fort Madison	Sauk and Fox warriors failed to capture a fort in Missouri Territory (present-day Fort Madison, Iowa) on the upper Mississippi River.
1812	Sep 5–12	Great Lakes region	Siege of Fort Wayne	Failed attempt by about 600 warriors from the Ottawa Nations to infiltrate and attack U.S. garrison at Fort Wayne at the confluence of the Maumee, St. Joseph and St. Mary Rivers in northeastern Indiana Territory.
1812	Sep 12	Great Lakes region	U.S. General Harrison reinforces Fort Wayne	
1812	Sep 14	Great Lakes region	A. C. Muir's British expedition at Fort Wayne	
1812	Sep 15	Great Lakes region	Copus massacre	U.S. troops threatened the forced displacement of Native American peoples in Ashland County, Ohio, against which they resisted. U.S. victory.
1812	Sep 16	St. Lawrence River	Battle of Matilda (Toussaint's Island)	Failed attempt of U.S. from Ogdensburg, New York to intercept a British supply convoy of forty bateaux coming up the St. Lawrence River.
1812; 1813	Sep 17– Oct	Great Lakes region	Harrison's campaign in the Northwest	U.S. campaign by William Henry Harrison, tasked with reestablishing security in the Old Northwest and retaking Detroit. He built Fort Meigs in early 1813, secured his supply line, and reoccupied Detroit after the U.S. victory Lake Erie.
1812	Sep 21	St. Lawrence River	Raid on Gananoque	Successful raid by American troops from Sackets Harbor on the British depot at Gananoque, Upper Canada.
1812	Oct 1	Niagara Frontier	First British raid at Charlotte, New York	British raid seizing U.S. merchantman Lady Murray and a smaller boat, with no U.S. resistance.
1812	Oct 4	St. Lawrence River	Assault on Ogdensburg	Failed British amphibious attack on Ogdensburg, a supply transshipment point on the St. Lawrence River, repelled by U.S. artillery.
1812	Oct 7	Great Lakes region	Winchester's U.S. army arrives near Fort Defiance	
1812	Oct 9	naval	U.S. Navy captures British brigs Caledonia and Detroit	At Fort Erie, Upper Canada, 100 U.S. soldiers raided across the Niagara River from Buffalo and captured two Provincial Marine brigs. The Caledonia was recovered, but the Detroit ran aground and was scuttled to prevent British recapture.
1812	Oct 13	Niagara Frontier	Battle of Queenston Heights	Major U.S. defeat when Stephen Van Rensselaer tried to capture Queenston, Upper Canada on the west side of the Niagara River. Isaac Brock was killed in battle.
1812	Oct 18	naval	Wasp versus HMS Frolic	Battle c. 300 miles north of Bermuda, seriously damaging both sloops. British sloop surrendered after U.S. sloop boarded it. Later that day, with both ship crews making repairs, HMS Poictiers captured USS Wasp and recaptured Frolic.
1812	Oct 22	St. Lawrence River	Battle of St. Regis	Temporary victory by New York State Militia who captured a British post at Akwesasne (St. Regis). British troops recaptured it and the nearby U.S. post at French Mills a month later.
1812	Oct 25	naval	USS United States vs HMS Macedonian	2-hour battle c. 500 miles west of Canary Islands; British frigate Macedonian surrendered to U.S. frigate United States, and was acquired by the U. S. Navy.
1812	Nov 5	home front	James Madison reelected	
1812	Nov ??	naval	British blockade South Carolina and Georgia	
1812	Nov 9	naval	Escape of HMS Royal George	
1812	Nov 10	St. Lawrence River	Battle of Kingston Harbour	Isaac Chauncey attacks Kingston Harbour
1812	Nov 19	Great Lakes region	Destruction of Prophetstown	U.S. attack ordered by Harrison on an unoccupied Indian settlement near the junction of the Tippecanoe and Wabash Rivers north of present-day Lafayette, Indiana.
1812	Nov 20	St. Lawrence River	Battle of Lacolle Mills, Lower Canada	Confused U.S. troops attacked each other, then were attacked by British/loyalist troops. U.S. troops retreated to Champlain, and Henry Dearborn called off his planned invasion of Lower Canada.
1812	Nov 22	Great Lakes region	Spur's Defeat	At Wildcat Creek (Indiana), Native American forces supported by the British defeated the U.S.
1812	Nov 22	naval	USS Vixen versus HMS Southampton	Pursuit and capture of U.S. brig Vixen, c. 90 miles east of St. Augustine, Florida, by British frigate Southampton. Both vessels were wrecked on a shoal near Concepcíon Island on November 27; the crews were rescued and taken to Jamaica.
1812	Nov 23	St. Lawrence River	Surrender of French Mills	British victory at French Mills, New York.
1812	Nov 27	Great Lakes region	Americans attack Fort Erie redoubts	
1812	Nov 28	Niagara Frontier	Battle of Frenchman's Creek, Upper Canada	U.S. raid across the Niagara River, spiking British artillery at Red House to enable a future U.S. landing, but failing to destroy a bridge over Frenchman's Creek to prevent British reinforcements.
1812	Nov 28– Dec 1	Niagara Frontier	Smyth's failed invasion of Upper Canada	U.S. officer Alexander Smyth tried and failed to get his invasion force assembled to cross the Niagara River and invade Upper Canada, but cancelled the entire operation.
1812	Dec 3	home front	William Eustis resigns as U.S. Secretary of War	
1812	Dec 3	home front	James Monroe serves as U.S. Secretary of War	
1812	Dec 18	Great Lakes region	Battle of the Mississinewa	Part of a U.S. expedition against Delaware and Miami villages where the Mississinewa River flows into the Wabash River near present-day Marion, Indiana.
1812	Dec 26	Atlantic Coast	British blockade Chesapeake and Delaware Bay	
1812	Dec 29	naval	USS Constitution versus HMS Java	2.5-hour battle off the coast of Brazil during which British 38-gun fifth-rate Java suffered such serious damage that its captain ordered it scuttled.
1812	Dec 29	home front	Paul Hamilton resigns as Secretary of the Navy	

=== 1813 ===
Year	Day	Theater	Occurrence	Notes
1813	Jan 12	home front	William Jones serves as Secretary of the Navy	
1813	Jan 22	Great Lakes region	Battle of Frenchtown	
1813	Jan 23	Great Lakes region	River Raisin massacre	
1813	Feb 5	home front	John Armstrong serves as Secretary of War	
1813	Feb 7	St. Lawrence River	Raid on Elizabethtown	U.S. victory.
1813	Feb 16	Great Lakes region	104th Regiment commences march from Fredericton to Upper Canada	104th Regiment of Foot (New Brunswick Fencibles)
1813	Feb 22	St. Lawrence River	Battle of Ogdensburg	
1813	Feb 24	naval	Sinking of HMS Peacock	
1813	Mar	naval	USS Essex rounds Cape Horn, preys on British whaling ships	
1813	Mar 3	Atlantic Coast	Admiral George Cockburn's squadron arrives in Lynnhaven Bay	
1813	Mar 19	Great Lakes region	Sir James Lucas Yeo appointed Commander-in-chief of the Lake Squadrons	
1813	Mar 27	Great Lakes region	Oliver Hazard Perry constructs Lake Erie fleet	
1813	Mar 30	Mississippi River	British blockade from Long Island to Mississippi	
1813	Apr	Atlantic Coast	Commerce raids begin in Chesapeake Bay	
1813	Apr	Great Lakes region	Battle of Tipton's Island	Indecisive clash between Shawnee and U.S. forces.
1813	Apr 6	Atlantic Coast	Bombardment of Lewes	Lewes, Delaware bombarded by British
1813	Apr 13	Mississippi River	Capture of Mobile	
1813	Apr 15	Mississippi River	Americans occupy West Florida	
1813	Apr 15	Great Lakes region	Battle of Africa Point	U.S. forces defeat pro-British Native Americans near Fort Lamotte on the Wabash River.
1813	Apr 27	Great Lakes region	Battle of York	At the site of present-day Toronto, Upper Canada.
1813	May 1	Great Lakes region	Siege of Fort Meigs	
1813	May 3	Atlantic Coast	Raid on Havre de Grace	
1813	May 5	St. Lawrence River	James Lucas Yeo arrives at Quebec	
1813	May 26	Atlantic Coast	British blockade middle states and southern states	
1813	May 27	Niagara Frontier	Battle of Fort George	
1813	May 27	Great Lakes region	British abandon Fort Erie	
1813	May 27	Great Lakes region	John Harvey retreats to Burlington Heights	
1813	May 29	Atlantic Coast	George Prevost and James Lucas Yeo attacked Sackets Harbor	
1813	Jun 1	Atlantic Coast	Capture of USS Chesapeake by HMS Shannon	
1813	Jun 3	St. Lawrence River	Capture of U.S. sloops Growler and Eagle near Île aux Noix	
1813	Jun 6	Great Lakes region	Battle of Stoney Creek	
1813	Jun 8	Great Lakes region	Skirmish at Forty Mile Creek	
1813	Jun 9	Great Lakes region	Americans abandon Fort Erie	
1813	Jun 13	St. Lawrence River	British vessels repulsed at Burlington, Vermont	
1813	Jun 19	Great Lakes region	Commodore Barclay's squadron appears off of Cleveland, Ohio	
1813	Jun 20	Atlantic Coast	USS Constellation1797 (6) attempts capture of blockading vessels off Hampton, Virginia	
1813	Jun 22	Atlantic Coast; Chesapeake campaign	Battle of Craney Island	
1813	Jun 24	Niagara Frontier	Battle of Beaver Dams	
1813	Jun 25	Atlantic Coast	Attack on Hampton, Virginia	
1813	Jun 27	Atlantic Coast	Privateer Teazer blown up in Mahone Bay, Nova Scotia	
1813	Jul 5	Niagara Frontier	Raid on Fort Schlosser	
1813	Jul 8	Mississippi River	Final siege of Fort Madison begins, fort defeated sometime in September	
1813	Jul 8		Action at Butler's Farm	
1813	Jul 11	Atlantic Coast	Privateers Atlas and Anaconda taken by the British at the port of Ocracoke, North Carolina	
1813	Jul 26	Great Lakes region	General Henry Procter quits the siege of Fort Meigs	
1813	Jul 27	Creek War	Battle of Burnt Corn	
1813	Jul 31		Raid on Plattsburg	
1813	Jul 31	Great Lakes region	Second occupation of York	
1813	Aug 2	Great Lakes region	Battle of Fort Stephenson	General Henry Proctor's assault fails
1813	Aug 4	Great Lakes region	Commodore Oliver Hazard Perry sails fleet into Lake Erie	
1813	Aug 5	naval	Dominica vs. Decatur	
1813	Aug 7	Great Lakes region	U.S. schooners Hamilton and Scourge founder on Lake Ontario	
1813	Aug 10	naval	Naval engagement ships Julia and Pert captured	
1813	Aug 12	naval	Capture of USS Argus	
1813	Aug 30	Creek War	Fort Mims massacre	Red Sticks capture fort and kill its U.S. soldiers and civilians.
1813	Sep 10	Great Lakes region	Battle of Lake Erie	Key U.S. victory
1813	Sep 25	Atlantic Coast	Capture of HMS Boxer	U.S. victory
1813	Sep 26	Great Lakes region	William Henry Harrison lands in Canada, Detroit liberated	
1813	Sep 28	St. Lawrence River	Burlington Races	
1813	Oct 5		Battle of the Thames	
1813	Oct 26		Battle of the Chateauguay	
1813	Nov 3		Battle of Tallushatchee	
1813	Nov 4	diplomacy	Great Britain offers the United States peace negotiations	
1813	Nov 6	St. Lawrence River	James Wilkinson's flotilla runs past the batteries at Fort Wellington	
1813	Nov 9		Battle of Talladega	
1813	Nov 10		Skirmish at Hoople's Creek	
1813	Nov 11		Battle of Crysler's Farm	
1813	Nov 13		Skirmish at Nanticoke	
1813	Nov 15	home front	Funeral of General Covington at French Mills	
1813	Nov 15	St. Lawrence River	James Wilkinson's army goes into winter quarters	
1813	Nov 16	Atlantic Coast	British extend naval blockade along U.S. coast	
1813	Dec 10	Atlantic Coast	Burning of Newark	
1813	Dec 10		Major General David Adams burned Nuyaka	
1813	Dec 15		Skirmish at Thomas McCrae's house	
1813	Dec 19	Niagara Front	Capture of Fort Niagara	
1813	Dec 19 - 31	Niagara Front	British destroy Lewiston, Fort Schlosser, Black Rock, and Buffalo	

==== 1813 Atlantic Coast battles ====
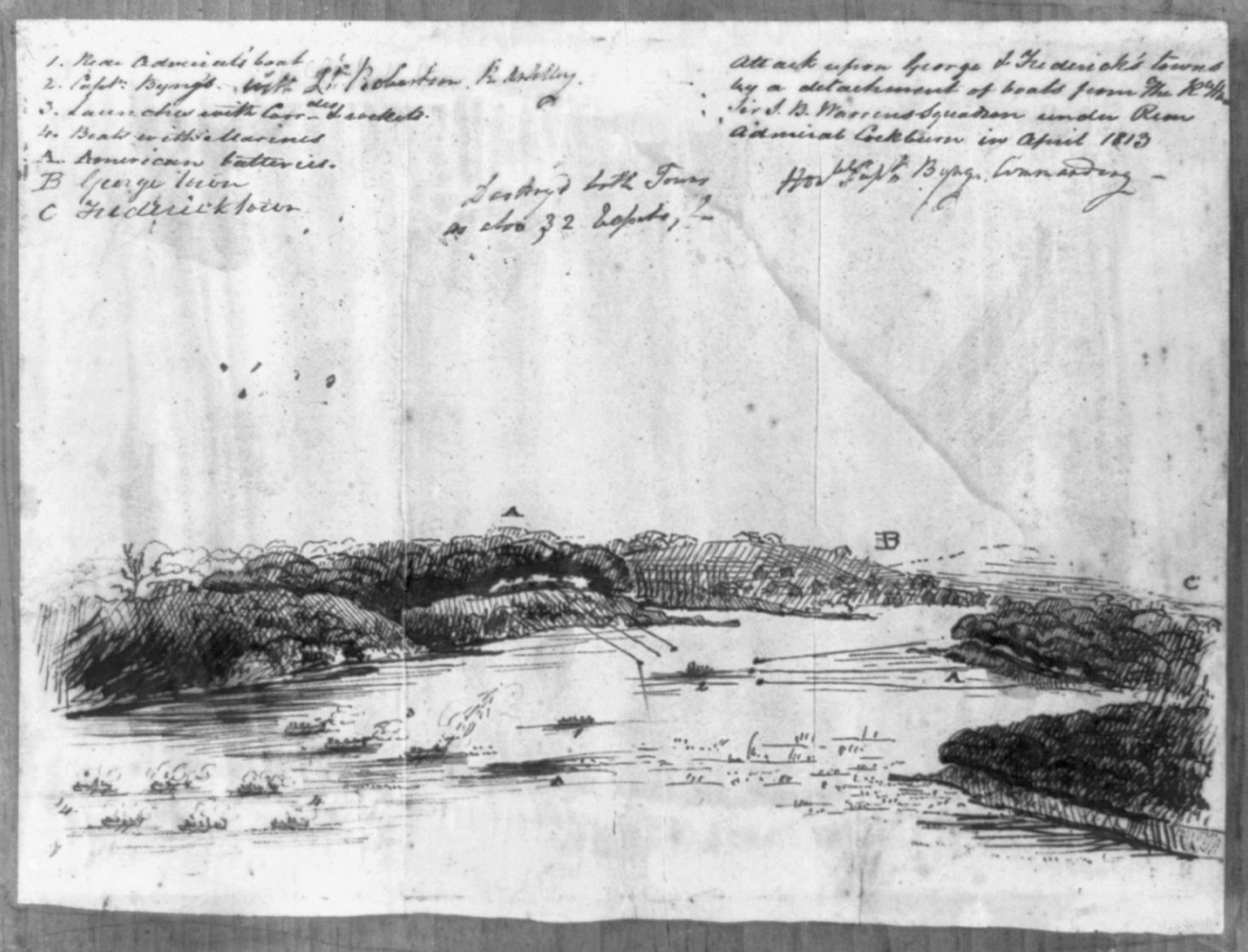
Attack upon George & Federick's towns by a detachment of boats from J. B. Warrens squadron under Rear Admiral Cockburn in April 1813

- Chesapeake campaign (March–September, 1813): British admiral John Borlase Warren tried to blockade Chesapeake Bay, gather intelligence on U.S. strength, destroy the USS Constitution, capture U.S. vessels and supplies. Vice admiral Alexander Cochrane destroyed much on-shore civilian private property. The result was status quo ante bellum.
- Battle of the Rappahannock River, Virginia (April 3, 1813): A British foray up the Rappahannock River, capturing or destroying 14 U.S. ships.
- Raid at Frenchtown, Maryland (April 29, 1813): A British raid on a small U.S. settlement.
- Raid on Havre de Grace and Principio Foundry, Maryland (May 3, 1813): A British raid conducted by a flotilla of boats under George Cockburn, resisted by Maryland militia. Brits burned and looted homes, burned a warehouse and appropriated or killed livestock. At the Principio Foundry they destroyed weapons and an arms factory.
- Raid at Georgetown and Fredericktown, Maryland (May 6, 1813): A British raid by HMS Mohawk on two U.S. villages on the Sassafras River, destroying uninhabited homes, four schooners and stores of sugar, lumber and leather.
- Assault on Craney Island, Virginia (June 22, 1813): An important U.S. victory, in which a British landing party failed to overcome a much smaller U.S. force defending the port city of Norfolk.
- Capture and occupation of Hampton, Virginia (June 25–26, 1813): British occupation and sacking of Hampton, Virginia. The British reportedly took guns, ammunition, wagons, horses, livestock and other foodstuffs, while French troops were reported to have participated in looting, vandalism, raping and killing. British casualties were 5 killed/33 wounded/10 missing.
- Raid at Ocracoke Inlet, North Carolina (July 11–16, 1813): A successful British naval operation in the Ocracoke Inlet, capturing a number of U.S. vessels and confiscating stores and livestock from the villages of Ocracoke and Portsmouth.
- Battle of St. Michaels, Saint Michaels, Maryland (August 10, 1813): U.S. victory.
- Second Battle of St. Michaels, Saint Michaels, Maryland (August 26, 1813): inconclusive.

==== 1813 Great Lakes region battles ====
- First Battle of Frenchtown, Michigan Territory (January 18, 1813): A skirmish in which a U.S. American detachment from Harrison's winter camp drove a British force (consisting of Canadian militia and Potawatomi and Wyandot warriors) out of Frenchtown.
- Second Battle of Frenchtown, Michigan Territory (January 22, 1813): A British victory achieved when a force of regulars, militia and native warriors surprised the Americans in a pre-dawn attack, and after several hours of heavy fighting, accepted the surrender of the entire American command. 410 U.S. troops were killed, the largest loss of life for the U.S. military in the entire war. Harrison ended his winter campaign to recapture Detroit.
- Siege of Fort Meigs, Ohio (May 1–9, 1813): A British force consisting of regulars, militia and over 1,000 warriors led by Tecumseh failed to capture the U.S. fort recently constructed fort at the rapids on the Maumee River.
- Siege of Fort Meigs, Ohio (July 21–28, 1813): A second unsuccessful attempt by the British to capture the fort, this time involving over 3,000 three thousand warriors from the Fox, Menominee, Ojibwa, Ottawa, Sac, Sioux and Winnebago Nations led by Tecumseh.
- Ball's Battle, Ohio (July 30, 1813): A battle near Fort Seneca between a pro-British Native force and a U.S. force (including Pennsylvania volunteers under James V. Ball) en route to Fort Stephenson.
- Battle of Fort Stephenson, Ohio (August 2, 1813): British fail to capture Fort Stephenson on the Sandusky River near present-day Fremont, Ohio.
- Battle of Lake Erie, Ohio (September 10, 1813): The pivotal naval battle, in which a squadron under Oliver Hazard Perry defeated the British squadron under Robert Heriot Barclay, giving the United States complete control of Lake Erie. With their supply line cut, the British in southwestern Lower Canada were forced to abandon Detroit and Fort Amherstburg and retreat eastward toward the Niagara Peninsula.
- Battle of the Thames, Upper Canada (October 5, 1813): A U.S. victory at Moraviantown, on the Thames River (near Chatham, Ontario), over the British army retreating from Detroit and Fort Amherstburg. Tecumseh and Roundhead were killed in battle.
- Skirmish at McCrae's House, Upper Canada (December 15, 1813): A British victory over a small contingent of American troops deployed on the Thames River c. 25 miles southwest of Moraviantown. The only time Canadian Militia defeated a regular American force.

==== 1813 Niagara Frontier battles ====
- Battle of York, Upper Canada (April 28, 1813): An American amphibious assault from Sackets Harbor captured Fort York and the town of York (present-day Toronto). The entire American force withdrew by May 8, after vandalizing and looting much of the town and burning the provincial legislature's buildings. The burning of the Capitol Building during the British raid on Washington was retribution for the American actions in York.
- Battle of Fort George, Upper Canada (May 27, 1813): British Fort George on Lake Ontario was captured during a U.S. amphibious attack across the Niagara river.
- Battle of Stoney Creek, Upper Canada (June 6, 1813): A British night attack on American troops encamped along Stoney Creek west of Lake Ontario, forcing U.S. troops at Fort George to abandon further advances into Upper Canada.
- Second raid at Charlotte, New York, at the mouth of the Genesee River (June 15, 1813): A British raid from James Yeo's Squadron that captured 500 barrels of flour and 1,200 bushels of corn.
- Raid on Sodus, New York (June 19–20, 1813): British victory.
- Battle of Beaver Dams, Upper Canada (June 24, 1813): A successful ambush by pro-British warriors of the Six and Seven Nations of an American detachment from Fort George en route to Beaver Dams.
- Blockade of Fort George, Upper Canada (July 1 – October 9, 1813): A British attempt to reoccupy Fort George following their victories at Stoney Creek (June 6, 1813) and Beaver Dams (June 24, 1813). There were frequent skirmishes (Ball Property) and raids (Black Rock) during this period. The blockade was lifted in order to redeploy troops in response to developments elsewhere along the Canada–US border, especially Wilkinson's Campaign on the St. Lawrence, which began in October, and the British defeat at Moraviantown in Upper Canada, which occurred on October 5.
- Raid at Fort Schlosser, New York (July 5, 1813): A successful British raid across the Niagara River on Fort Schlosser, seizing valuable U.S. military assets.
- Skirmishes at the Ball Property, Upper Canada (July 8 – September 6, 1813): A series of skirmishes that occurred just west of Niagara, Upper Canada, between the American and British lines during the blockade of Fort George (July 1 – October 9, 1813).
- Raid at Black Rock, New York (July 11, 1813): A British raid on Black Rock, New York during the blockade of Fort George. After initial success, the British suffered heavy casualties during their withdrawal.
- Raid at York, Upper Canada (July 31 – August 1, 1813): A brief amphibious American incursion in which the Americans freed some prisoners, confiscated military baggage and supplies and a number of bateaux. Before leaving the Americans burned buildings on Gibraltar Point in retribution for the British raid on Sodus, New York, on June 19.
- Loss of the two American schooners Hamilton (1809) and Scourge (1812) (August 8, 1813): A violent storm destroyed the schooners Hamilton and Scourge.
- Battle of Nanticoke Creek, Upper Canada (November 13, 1813): An expedition of Norfolk and Oxford Militia to capture American loyalist marauders who had been active in the area.
- Burning of Niagara, Upper Canada (December 10–11, 1813): The unprovoked burning of Niagara by a small force of American troops under George McClure, who felt his position at Fort George untenable, and ordered that Niagara be destroyed as he evacuated his command to Fort Niagara.
- Capture of Fort Niagara, New York (December 18–19, 1813): An unexpected night attack by British infantry on the under-strength American garrison at Fort Niagara at the mouth of the Niagara River, which resulted in the relatively easy capture of the fort. Fort Niagara remained under British control for the rest of the war.
- Battle of Lewiston, Lewiston, New York, December 19–21, 1813: British-Native victory.
- Raid at Black Rock and Buffalo, New York (December 30, 1813): A British raid launched following the capture of Fort Niagara to retaliate for the U.S. burning of the town of Niagara, and to mop up all American forces on the Niagara Frontier. The raid achieved complete British control of the Niagara River region.

==== 1813 St. Lawrence River battles ====
- Raid on Brockville (February 7, 1813): U.S. troops from Ogdensburg, New York raided Brockville after a British party from Brockville crossed the St. Lawrence River to apprehend deserters on New York soil.
- Second attack on Ogdensburg, New York (February 22, 1813): A successful British attack culminating in the capture of Ogdensburg, a U.S. town controlling naval movement and logistics on the St. Lawrence River.
- Second Battle of Sacket's Harbor, New York (May 29, 1813): An unsuccessful British naval and amphibious attack on Sackets Harbor, intended as a diversion while the Americans were bombarding Fort George.
- Capture of the Eagle (1812) and Growler (1812) (June 3, 1813): The British captured two U.S. sloops, Eagle (1812) and Growler (1812), in the Richelieu River. The British renamed them Shannon (1813) and Broke and impressed them to service on Lake Champlain.
- British raid at Sodus, New York (June 19, 1813): A raid from James Yeo's squadron off Sodus Bay, confiscating U.S. supplies.
- Skirmish at Cranberry Creek, New York (July 1 9, 1813): The ambush of a British force advancing up Cranberry Creek to engage an American force.
- Murray's Raid, New York and Vermont (July 29 – August 4, 1813): A successful British raid on American posts and towns (including Champlain and Plattsburgh) located along the Richelieu River and Lake Champlain. The largely unopposed raid resulted in the British capture of eight vessels and supplies, the destruction of a great deal of public property, and asserting British control of Lake Champlain.
- Capture of the American schooners Julia and Growler (August 10, 1813): During a Lake Ontario battle, James Yeo's and Isaac Chauncey's squadrons captured U.S. schooners Julia) and Growler. Yeo renamed them Confiance and Hamilton.
- First Skirmish at Odelltown, Lower Canada (September 20, 1813): A minor skirmish, following which Wade Hampton abandoned his plan to invade Lower Canada, retreating to Four Corners on the Upper Chateaguay River in New York.
- Wilkinson's campaign on the St. Lawrence River (October–November, 1813)': Part of an attack on Montreal by an American force from Sackets Harbor under James Wilkinson, down the St. Lawrence River, combined with an attack northward along the Richelieu River from Lake Champlain, by troops under Wade Hampton. Hampton cancelled the advance after the battle of Chateauguay and the defeat of Wilkinson's army at the Battle of Crysler's Farm.
- Raid at Missisquoi Bay, Lower Canada (October 12, 1813): A raid ordered by Wade Hampton on Philipsburg. The goal of the raid was to reduce smuggling between Vermont and Lower Canada, and to divert British attention from the Richelieu River.
- Battle on the Chateauguay, Lower Canada (October 26, 1813): An unsuccessful American attack on Canadien militia and First Nations warriors defending the lower Chateauguay River.
- Skirmish at French Creek, New York (November 1–2, 1813): An inconclusive attempt by the British to disrupt and harass the advance guard of Wilkinson's army as it advanced from Sackets Harbor down the St. Lawrence River toward Montreal.
- Battle of Point Iroquois (November 8, 1813): The first battle in Wilkinson's St. Lawrence campaign when General Macomb's brigade came ashore in Canada and skirmished with the Dundas Militia at Point Iroquois.
- Skirmish at Doran's Farm (November 8–9, 1813): A small skirmish between advancing American Dragoons and Dundas and Glengarry Militia.
- Battle of Hoople's Creek (November 10, 1813): A successful action by the British, which delayed the advance of Wilkinson's army on Cornwall, Upper Canada, a landing and storage point for British supplies.
- Battle of Crysler's Farm (November 11, 1813): The British victory over the rear guard of Wilkinson's Division near Cornwall.
- Occupation of Cornwall (November 11–13, 1813): Following their defeat at Crysler's Farm, the American army advanced and occupied Cornwall, but with no help from Hampton Wilkinson decided to abandon his St. Lawrence campaign and retreat to New York.

==== 1813 naval battles ====
- USS Viper versus HMS Narcissus (January 17, 1813): British captured American brig Viper.
- Hornet versus HMS Peacock (February 24, 1813): Off the Demerara River, Guyana, U.S. sloop Hornet spotted British sloop Espiegle and sloop Peacock. The Peacock opened fire, and was so badly damaged that it sank shortly after surrendering.
- Chesapeake versus HMS Shannon (June 1, 1813): This battle, off the New England coast between Cape Cod and Cape Ann, is noted as the war's only action between frigates of equal strength. The ships exchange broadsides at close range after which Philip Broke led a British boarding party onto the American ship, which surrendered.
- Attack on HMS Junon (June 20, 1813): A flotilla of American gunboats in the Elizabeth River below Norfolk, Virginia attacked the anchored British frigate Junon, which managed to escape after 1.5 hours of engaging the Americans.
- Delaware flotilla versus HMS Martin (July 29, 1813): An attack by the Delaware flotilla, consisting of eight gunboats and two blockships, on the British sloop Martin, which ran aground on a shoal near Cape May. After 2 hours, the Americans lost a gunboat and withdrew, while the Martin sustained only minor damage and was subsequently refloated.
- USS Argus (1803) versus HMS Pelican (August 14, 1813): British brig Pelican damaged American sloop Argus (which had been attacking shipping) in St. George's Channel between Wales and Ireland so much that it was forced to surrender.
- Enterprise versus HMS Boxer (September 5, 1813): An hour-long engagement off the coast of Maine, during which the American brig Enterprise caused such heavy damage on the British sloop Boxer that it was forced to surrender, and towed to Portland. Both commanders were killed in battle.
- USS President versus HMS Highflyer (September 23, 1813): An action off the coast of New England during which the American frigate President captured the British schooner Highflyer.
- USS Vixen versus HMS Belvidera (December 25, 1813): The capture of American schooner Vixen off Delaware after a two-hour pursuit by British frigate Belvidera.

==== 1813 Gulf Coast battles ====
- Capture of Mobile (April 13, 1813): American forces under James Wilkinson capture the city of Mobile from the Spanish.
- Battle of Burnt Corn Creek (July 27, 1813): An American ambush of a party of the Red Sticks faction of Creek Indians. The initially successful Americans were later dispersed.
- Fort Mims Massacre (August 30, 1813): The defeat of the American garrison at Fort Mims by a party of the Red Sticks faction of Creek Indians.
- Battle of Tallushatchee (November 3, 1813): A successful attack on the Creek village of Tallushatchee with a force of 1,000 dragoons under John Coffee.
- Battle of Talladega (November 9, 1813): An action led by Andrew Jackson that broke the siege of the friendly Creek Indian town of Talladega, which was being besieged by an enemy Creek force.
- Hillabee massacre 1 (November 11, 1813): An action in which Gen. White (under Major Gen. John Cocke's command) burned the Hillabee Indian villages of Little Oakfusky and Genalga.
- The Canoe Fight (November 12, 1813): A skirmish fought along the Alabama River, pitting Capt. Samuel Dale's 70 militia against a larger group of Red Sticks Creeks, fought entirely in canoes.
- Hillabee massacre 2 (November 18, 1813): An action conducted by troops under the command of Gen. White (under Maj. Gen. John Cocke's command) during which the town of Hillabee was burned, 60 people killed.
- Battle of Autossee (November 29, 1813): An action conducted by Gen. Floyd, with 950 Georgia militia and 400 friendly Indians, attacked the Indian town of Autossee. About two hundred Indians were killed and the town of four hundred houses burned.
- Action at Nuyaka (December 17, 1813): An action conducted by troops under the command of Maj. Gen. David Adams in which the upper Creek village of Nuyaka was burned.
- Battle of Holy Ground – also known as the Battle of Econochaca – (December 23, 1813): An action in which Gen. Claiborne cleared the mostly evacuated Indian town of Econochaca.

=== 1814 ===
Year	Day	Theater	Occurrence	Notes
1814	Jan 23		Battles of Emuckfaw and Enotachopo Creek	
1814	Jan 24		Battle of Enotachopco	
1814	Jan 27		Battle of Calebee Creek	
1814	Mar 4		Battle of Longwoods	
1814	Mar 27		Battle of Horseshoe Bend	
1814	Mar 28		Capture of USS Essex	
1814	Mar 30		Battle of Lacolle Mills (1814)	
1814	Apr 11	diplomacy	Napoleon abdicates French throne for the first time	
1814	Apr 20		HMS Orpheus defeats USS Frolic	
1814	Apr 14	diplomacy	United States repeals Embargo Act and Nonimportation Act	
1814	Apr 25	Atlantic Coast	British extend blockade to New England	
1814	Apr 29		Capture of HMS Epervier	
1814	May 1		General William Clark leaves St. Louis for Prairie du Chien	
1814	May 6		Raid on Fort Oswego	
1814	May 14		Skirmish at Otter Creek	
1814	May 18		Lieutenant Colonel Robert McDouall relieves Fort Mackinac	
1814	May 29		Skirmish at Sandy Creek	
1814	Jun 6	Mississippi River	William Clark establishes Fort Shelby at Prairie du Chien	
1814	Jun 28		Major William McKay's expedition leaves Fort Mackinac	
1814	Jun 28		USS Wasp defeats HMS Reindeer	
1814	Jul 3	Great Lakes region	Americans capture Fort Erie	
1814	Jul 5		Battle of Chippawa	
1814	Jul 20		Trials at Ancaster Bloody Assize	
1814	Jul 20	Mississippi River	Surrender of Fort Shelby	
1814	Jul 21		Battle of Rock Island Rapids	
1814	Jul 21		Raid on Sault Ste. Marie	
1814	Jul 22	diplomacy	Treaty of Greenville US and western tribes ally against Great Britain	
1814	Jul 25		Battle of Lundy's Lane	
1814	Jul 26		Sinclair's squadron arrives off Mackinac Island	
1814	Aug 1		Schooner Nancy warned of Fort Mackinac blockade	
1814	Aug 2	Great Lakes region	Siege of Fort Erie	
1814	Aug 4		Battle of Mackinac Island	
1814	Aug 8		Peace negotiations begin in Ghent	
1814	Aug 9	diplomacy	Creek people sign treaty at Fort Jackson	
1814	Aug 10		Raid on Stonington	
1814	Aug 12		Capture of USS Somers and USS Ohio on Lake Erie	
1814	Aug 13		Part of Sinclair's squadron arrives at Nottawasaga River	
1814	Aug 14		Schooner Nancy destroyed	
1814	Aug 14	Gulf Coast	British occupy Pensacola	
1814	Aug 15	Great Lakes region	Assault on Fort Erie	
1814	Aug 19		British land near Benedict, Maryland	
1814	Aug 24		Battle of Bladensburg	
1814	Aug 24		Burning of Washington	
1814	Aug 27		British occupy Point Lookout, Maryland	
1814	Aug 27		Retreating garrison destroys Fort Washington	
1814	Aug 28	Atlantic Coast	Raid on Alexandria (Virginia)	British capture Alexandria, Virginia.
1814	Aug 28	diplomacy	Nantucket declares neutrality	
1814	Sep 1		Construction commences on Penetang Road	
1814	Sep 1		USS Wasp sinks HMS Avon	
1814	Sep 1		George Prevost moves south toward Plattsburgh	
1814	Sep 3		Capture of Tigress and Scorpion	
1814	Sep 4		Battle of Plattsburgh	
1814	Sep 4	home front	John Armstrong, Jr. resigns and James Monroe becomes Secretary of War	
1814	Sep 5		Skirmish at Rock Island Rapids	
1814	Sep 6		Skirmish at Beekmantown	
1814	Sep 6		Battle of Credit Island	
1814	Sep 8		Fort Johnson built, abandoned one month later	
1814	Sep 9		Capture of Fort O'Brian	
1814	Sep 11		Battle of Plattsburgh	
1814	Sep 12		Battle of North Point	
1814	Sep 12	Gulf Coast	British repulsed at Mobile, Alabama	
1814	Sep 13		Bombardment of Fort McHenry	
1814	Sep 13		Francis Scott Key writes "The Star-Spangled Banner"	
1814	Sep 14		Battle of Fort Bowyer	
1814	Sep 17		Counterattack at Siege of Fort Erie	
1814	Sep 26		British squadron captures USS General Armstrong	
1814	Oct 19		Battle of Cook's Mills	
1814	Oct 21	diplomacy	United Kingdom offers peace on basis of uti possidetis	
1814	Oct 26		Raid through the Thames Valley	
1814	Nov 5		Americans evacuate Fort Erie	
1814	Nov 6		Battle of Malcolm's Mills	
1814	Nov 7	Gulf Coast	Battle of Pensacola	
1814	Nov 25	Gulf Coast	British fleet sail from Jamaica for New Orleans	
1814	Nov 27	diplomacy	United Kingdom drops demands for uti possidetis	
1814	Dec 14	Gulf Coast	British overwhelm American gunboats on Lake Borgne	
1814	Dec 15	diplomacy	Hartford Convention	
1814	Dec 15	home front	United States adopts additional internal taxation	
1814	Dec 23	Gulf Coast	British land their troops below New Orleans	
1814	Dec 23		Andrew Jackson surprise-attacks the British camp at Villeré Plantation	
1814	Dec 24	diplomacy	Treaty of Ghent signed	
1814	Dec 28	home front	United States rejects conscription proposal	

==== 1814 Atlantic Coast battles ====
- Cochrane's Chesapeake Bay Campaign (April–September, 1814): British fleet campaign in the Chesapeake Bay area under Alexander Cochrane and George Cockburn, including the attacks on Washington and Baltimore. It involved aggressive measures against American settlements along the coast, as well as issuing a proclamation inviting slaves to join the British in fighting against the Americans.
- Raid on Pettipaug, Connecticut (April 7–8, 1814): A successful British small boat action up the Connecticut River by 136 British sailors and six ships under Richard Coote to burn the privateer fleet at Pettipaug (now Essex), burning 25 American vessels and capturing two, losing only two men. The raid devastated American privateering capabilities.
- Skirmish at Pongoteague Creek, Virginia (May 30, 1814): A successful British amphibious attack on an American battery that had been installed on a bluff at Pongoteague Creek and manned by Virginia militia.
- Skirmish off of Cedar Point, Maryland (June 1, 1814)': Indecisive encounter near the mouth of the Patuxent River between an American flotilla and British ships from George Cockburn's fleet.
- Skirmishes at St. Leonard's Creek, Maryland (June 8–26, 1814): A series of actions initiated by a flotilla of British ships from George Cockburn's fleet against a flotilla of American ships that had retreated into St. Leonard's Creek. While the American flotilla was bottled up in the creek, the British conducted raids along the Patuxent. The American ships fought their way out of the blockade on June 26.
- Maine campaign (July, 1814 – April, 1815): A British naval operation along the Maine coast. The British encountered little opposition, and at various times occupied Eastport, Machias, Castine and Bangor.
- Battle of Stonington (August 9–12, 1814): British vessels HMS Ramillies, HMS Pactolus, HMS Dispatch, and HMS Terror under the command of Sir Thomas Hardy bombarded the borough of Stonington, Connecticut. Stonington residents returned fire for three days, resulting in many British casualties but no American casualties.
- Gordon's Raid on the Potomac River (August 17 – September 6, 1814): An expedition up the Potomac River by a squadron of British ships under Captain James Gordon, as a diversion from the Patuxent River expedition. Gordon's raid expelled U.S. forces at Fort Washington, Maryland, the occupation of Alexandria, Virginia, and much loot.
- Battle of Bladensburg, Maryland (August 24, 1814): The Americans' worst battle of the war during which a British force of fewer than 5,000 troops routed an American force of nearly 7,000, leaving Washington undefended.
- Burning of Washington, DC (August 24–25, 1814): The occupation of the U.S. capital by a British force of 4,000–5,000 troops from George Cockburn's fleet in Chesapeake Bay, usually interpreted as retaliation for the American burning and looting of York in 1813. The British burned the Capitol Building, the Library of Congress, the White House and buildings housing the Treasury and War Departments, but the only private building set afire was one from which the British had been fired upon.
- Battle of Caulk's Field, Kent County, Maryland (August 31, 1814): U.S. victory.
- Battle of Hampden, Hampden, Maine (September 3, 1814): British victory.
- Battle of Baltimore, Maryland (September 12–15, 1814): A combined sea and land assault on the important port city of Baltimore. The Americans repulsed both the bombardment of Fort McHenry and the land invasion.
- Battle of North Point, Maryland (September 12, 1814): An important battle that thwarted the British plan to follow up their victories at Bladensburg and Washington with the capture of Baltimore. British troops under Robert Ross met U.S. soldiers under John Stricker; although the latter were forced to retreat, they did so in good order and inflicted significant casualties on the British, killing Ross. His successor Arthur Brooke delayed the advance against Baltimore, buying U.S. forces time to prepare the city's defenses.
- Bombardment of Fort McHenry, Maryland (September 13–14, 1814): The failed British attempt during the attack on Baltimore to subdue Fort McHenry, which blocked access to Baltimore Harbor. When it became evident that Fort McHenry would not surrender, the major British land assault was called off, and the troops that had landed at North Point were withdrawn.
- Skirmish at Farnham Church, Farnham, Virginia, December 6, 1814: U.S. victory.

==== 1814 Great Lakes region battles ====
- Skirmish at Longwoods, Upper Canada (March 4, 1814): An American victory that occurred when a mounted raiding party from Detroit was intercepted by a British force from an outpost at Delaware, Upper Canada, west of Lake Ontario.
- Sinclair's campaign on the Upper Lakes (July–August, 1814): A largely unsuccessful U.S. attempt by to seize control of the upper lakes following the British withdrawal around Detroit. The only American successes were to capture three British merchantmen, destroy an abandoned British fort on St. Joseph's Island and conduct a raid on the trading post on the St. Mary River. They failed to recapture Fort Michillimackinaw, and lost two schooners on the return trip.
- Raid at St. Marys River, Upper Canada (July 23–26, 1814): A raid by Arthur Sinclair's squadron on the St. Marys River, capturing a fur-trading post, destroying buildings and capturing British schooner Perseverance (badly damaged and then set afire).
- Assault on Mackinac Island (August 4, 1814): A failed U.S. attempt to recapture Mackinac Island during Sinclair's campaign on the Upper Lakes.
- Destruction of HMS Nancy (August 13, 1814): British schooner Nancy in the Nottawasaga River was destroyed by a U.S. landing party.
- Capture of the American schooners Tigress and Scorpion (September 3 and 6, 1814): A small detachment of Royal Newfoundland Fencibles and a few seamen captured U.S. schooners Tigress and Scorpion near Drummond Island.
- McArthur's Raid/Battle of Malcolm's Mills (November 6, 1814): An American victory in the upper Thames Valley between Canadian militia and an American force of 750 mounted infantry under Duncan McArthur. McArthur's two-week raid into Canada destroyed the mills that the British forces in the Great Lakes region were dependent upon for flour and bread, and created a diversion allowing U.S. forces at Fort Erie to escape unharmed. The Americans reportedly killed, wounded or captured over 450 enemies, while losing only one killed and six wounded.

==== 1814 Niagara Frontier battles ====
- Raid on Port Dover, Upper Canada (May 14–15, 1814): U.S. raid on settlements on Lake Erie's northern shore, burning mills and storehouses (as well as private dwellings) containing supplies used by British troops stationed in the Niagara Peninsula. The raid is claimed to have been in retribution for the British raid at Black Rock and Buffalo in December 1813.
- Brown's campaign on the Niagara River (July–October, 1814): The most competently planned and executed attempt by the Americans under Jacob Brown to invade Canada along the Niagara Frontier. Despite early victories at Fort Erie and Chippewa, it stalled at the well-fought draw at Lundy's Lane, and ended when the Americans retired to Fort Erie.
- Capture of Fort Erie, Upper Canada (July 3, 1814): First battle in Jacob Brown's campaign on the Niagara River. The British surrendered the fort without much of a fight.
- Battle of Chippawa, Upper Canada (July 5, 1814): A well-fought American victory against a numerically superior British force just south of Chippawa Creek.
- Burning of St. Davids, Upper Canada (July 18, 1814): A raid by New York militia encountering unexpectedly fierce resistance from residents of a village close to Queenston Heights, where Jacob Brown wanted to occupy a position following the Battle of Chippawa. Brown dismissed the U.S. commander who ordered the action.
- Battle of Lundy's Lane, Upper Canada (July 25, 1814): The bloodiest battle of the war taking place near Niagara Falls. A tactical draw, it was so costly U.S. forces they had to fall back to Fort Erie, ending Brown's invasion of Upper Canada.
- Battle of Conjocta Creek, New York (August 3, 1814): Following the Battle of Lundy's Lane, a British raid sought to destroy U.S. American supplies and batteries at Black Rock and Buffalo. They were defeated in a skirmish at Conjocta Creek.
- Siege of Fort Erie, Upper Canada (August 5 – September 21, 1814): Failed British attempt to recapture Fort Erie, involving nearly continuous skirmishing and a failed assault on August 15.
- Capture of the American schooners Ohio and Somers (August 12, 1814): Two U.S. schooners captured by the British during the Siege of Fort Erie.
- Destruction of the British brig Magnet (August 15, 1814): George Hawkesworth deliberately ran his ship, the British brig Magnet, aground near the mouth of the Niagara River to prevent the Americans capturing it. To avoid court-martial, Hawkesworth defected to the Americans.
- Assault on Fort Erie, Upper Canada (August 15, 1814): Failed British attempt to recapture Fort Erie from the Americans. The British tried an initial bombardment followed by a diversionary attack by native warriors and a coordinated night attack from the south, west and north, against a larger-than-expected and well-led American force on the inside.
- Sortie from Fort Erie, Upper Canada (September 17, 1814): A sortie against British batteries still bombarding the fort after the failed British assault, a costly action for both sides. Shortly thereafter the British lifted the siege, retreating to Chippawa.
- Skirmish at Cook's Mills, Upper Canada (October 19, 1814): The final engagement of the war on the Niagara Peninsula, also known as the Skirmish at Lyons Creek. The Americans attempted to seize and destroy British provisions at Cook's Mills after the siege at Fort Erie, destroying 200 bushels of grain.

==== 1814 St. Lawrence River battles ====
- Salmon River Raid (1814) (February 14–24, 1814): British raids on U.S. depots and supply centers following James Wilkinson's army's evacuation of French Mills in early February. The British captured lots of provisions and equipment from depots at French Mills, Malone, Fort Corners, Madrid and Hopkinton before returning to Canada.
- Second Battle of Lacolle, Lower Canada (March 30, 1814): A British victory ending the last U.S. attempt to invade Lower Canada along the Richelieu River.
- Assault on Oswego, New York (May 5–6, 1814): A successful British amphibious attack on U.S. transshipment point Oswego, New York for supplies, especially heavy ordnance and equipment. The British also captured lightly-defended Fort Ontario.
- Skirmish at Otter Creek, Vermont (May 14, 1814): U.S. victory by a naval squadron under Thomas MacDononough, supported by a battery at Fort Cassin, over a British naval force sailing from Isle-aux-Noix, Lower Canada, attempting to attack the shipyard at Vergennes, Vermont.
- Battle of Big Sandy Creek, New York (May 30, 1814): U.S. force ambushes 7 British ships (several loaded with troops) tricked into following an American boat up the river before launching an attack from the banks.
- Second Skirmish at Odelltown, Lower Canada (June 28, 1814): One of several indecisive skirmishes at the New York / Lower Canada border in spring–summer 1814.
- Prévost's Lake Champlain campaign (August 30 – September 12, 1814): Failed British invasion of the United States along the Richelieu River and Lake Champlain. The U.S. victory significantly impacted the peace negotiations at Ghent, allowing the Americans to insist upon exclusive rights to Lake Champlain and denying the British exclusive rights to the Great Lakes.
- Battle of Plattsburgh, New York (September 11, 1814: U.S. victory ending the British invasion of New York. George Downie's squadron and some of George Prevost's divisions were defeated on Lake Champlain, New York, by Thomas MacDonough's squadron and Alexander Macomb's land forces.

==== 1814 Gulf Coast battles ====
- Battles of Emuckfaw and Enotachopo Creek (Jan 22, 1814)
- Battle of Calebee Creek – also called Battle for Camp Defiance – (Jan 27, 1814)
- Battle of Horseshoe Bend (1814) (Mar 27, 1814)
- Cochrane's Gulf Coast campaign (May, 1814 – February, 1815): British naval operation off the southern U.S. coast to fashion an alliance with the Creek Nation against the Americans, and support British attacks on Mobile and New Orleans.
- Attack on Fort Bowyer, Spanish West Florida (September 15, 1814): Failed British attempt to capture Fort Bowyer near the mouth of Mobile Bay.
- Capture of Pensacola, Spanish Florida (November 7, 1814): Successful U.S. operation under Andrew Jackson to remove the threat posed to Mobile by British troops based at Spanish-held Pensacola.
- Battle of Lake Borgne, Louisiana (December 14, 1814): A battle on Lake Borgne east of New Orleans, between a U.S. flotilla and British ships under Alexander Cochrane. The British eventually prevailed in a hard-fought battle, thereby enabling a landing close to New Orleans.
- Battle of Villeré's Plantation (December 23, 1814): Opening engagement of the New Orleans campaign, precipitated by a U.S. surprise attack on the British advance force camped on Jacque Villeré's plantation on the Mississippi River's east bank.
- Reconnaissance in force by British at New Orleans, Louisiana (December 28, 1814): A British probe of U.S. commander Andrew Jackson's main defense line on the Rodriguez Canal about 4 miles below New Orleans.

==== 1814 Mississippi battles ====
- Occupation of Prairie du Chien, Illinois Territory (June 2, 1814): A preemptive move by the Americans to occupy a fur-trading settlement at the Wisconsin and Mississippi rivers' confluence, preventing potential British invasions. The Americans constructed Fort Shelby afterwards.
- Siege of Prairie du Chien, Fort Shelby, Illinois Territory (July 17–20, 1814): The British captured Fort Shelby to secure the lucrative fur trade passing through Prairie du Chien.
- First skirmish at Rock Island Rapids, Missouri Territory (July 21, 1814): A pro-British band of Sauk warriors attacked 5 U.S. boats carrying supplies up the Mississippi River to Fort Shelby, forcing them to retreat. These engagements were the westernmost actions in the War of 1812.
- Second skirmish at Rock Island Rapids, Missouri Territory (September 5, 1814): Failed U.S. expedition sent up the Mississippi River to destroy villages and crops of the Sauk and Fox Nations at Saukenuk (modern northwestern Illinois). Over 1,000 native warriors attacked the expedition, forcing the Americans to retreat downstream.

==== 1814 naval battles ====
- USS Constitution versus HMS Pictou (February 14, 1814): U.S. frigate Constitution captured and scuttled British schooner Pictou between Barbados and Surinam.
- Essex versus HMS Phoebe and HMS Cherub (March 28, 1814): British frigate Phoebe and sloop Cherub captured U.S. frigate Essex as it tried to escape from the neutral harbor of Valparaiso.
- USS Frolic versus HMS Orpheus and HMS Shelburne (April 20, 1814): British frigate Orpheus and sloop Shelburne captured U.S. sloop Frolic off the coast of Cuba after a six-hour pursuit. The British renamed the Frolic the Florida and impressed it into service.
- USS Peacock versus HMS Epervier (April 29, 1814) : A 45-minute battle off Cape Canaveral, Florida in which U.S. sloop Peacock captured British brig-sloop Epervier.
- USS Rattlesnake versus HMS Leander (June 22, 1814): British 50-gun fourth-rate Leander captured U.S. brig Rattlesnake near Sable Island off Nova Scotia. The Rattlesnake jettisoned its guns in a vain attempt to outrun its pursuers.
- USS Wasp versus HMS Reindeer (June 28, 1814): A battle in the mouth of the English Channel resulting in the capture and destruction of British sloop Reindeer by U.S. sloop Wasp.
- USS Siren versus HMS Medway (July 12, 1814)': British 74-gun third-rate Medway captured U.S. brig-sloop Siren off the coast of South Africa after an 11-hour pursuit.
- USS Wasp versus HMS Avon (September 1, 1814): A battle off the coast of England in which U.S. sloop Wasp defeated British sloop Avon. The Avon sank before Americans could capture it, or other British warships could recover it.
- Defense of the cutter Eagle, Long Island, New York (October 10–13, 1814): British victory.

=== 1815 ===
Year	Day	Theater	Occurrence	Notes
1815	Jan 1	Gulf Coast	Artillery duel at New Orleans	A three-hour cannon duel between 4 British batteries, including heavy naval guns and a rocket battery, and 7 U.S. batteries in Andrew Jackson's line of defense. The British ceased fire when their artillery ran out of ammunition and failed to breach Jackson's ramparts.
1815	Jan 8	Gulf Coast	Battle of New Orleans	Most lop-sided U.S. victory of the war: British had 2,037 casualties (KIA, WIA, POW), Americans around 71.
1815	Jan 9– 18	Gulf Coast	Siege of Fort St. Philip (1815)	Failed British attempt to dislodge U.S. forces at Fort St. Philip, Louisiana that would have blocked efforts to supply the British in New Orleans.
1815	Jan 13–14	Atlantic Coast	Battle of Fort Peter	British victory.
1815	Jan 15	naval	Capture of USS President	British warship HMS Endymion captured U.S. frigate President attempting to break out of the British blockade of New York City. The President was severely damaged, and surrendered.
1815	Jan– Mar	Gulf Coast	Cumberland Island campaign	Diversionary expedition of Cochrane's Gulf Coast campaign (May 1814 – Feb 1815) to the southeastern U.S. coast. Brits under George Cockburn occupied Cumberland Island, a fort and the town of St. Marys in Jan 1815, effectively blockading Savannah, Charleston and other coastal areas. Cockburn left on March 18 after learning of the Treaty of Ghent.
1815	Feb 1	home front	Penetanguishene Naval Yard construction begins	
1815	Feb 4	diplomacy	United States adopts second enemy trade law	
1815	Feb 12	Gulf Coast	Battle of Fort Bowyer	Last Gulf Coast theater battle. British forces retreating from New Orleans landed on Dauphine Island and recaptured nearby Fort Bowyer, but withdrew upon news of the Treaty of Ghent.
1815	Feb 17	diplomacy	United States ratifies Treaty of Ghent	
1815	Feb 17	diplomacy	United States rejects First Bank of the United States proposal	
1815	Feb 20	naval	USS Constitution versus HMS Cyane and HMS Levant	U.S. frigate Constitution captured two British sixth-rates Cyane and Levant about 200 miles northeast of Madeira. The Levant was later recaptured by British frigate Leander.
1815	Feb 26	naval	US privateer Chasseur versus HMS St Lawrence	U.S. privateer Chasseur captured British schooner St. Lawrence, which was carrying news of the signing of the Treaty of Ghent to the British, in the Gulf of Mexico.
1815	Mar 1	diplomacy	Napoleon escaped from Elba, triggering the Hundred Days	
1815	Mar 10	diplomacy	Treaty of Nicolls' Outpost (unratified)	
1815	Mar 11	naval	Recapture of HMS Levant	British squadron under Collier recaptured British warship Levant as Constitution tried to flee with its two prizes from the harbor at Porto Playa in the Cape Verde Islands.
1815	Mar 23	naval	USS Hornet versus HMS Penguin	U.S. sloop Hornet captured British sloop Penguin in a battle near Tristan de Cunha.
1815	Apr 6	naval	Escape from H M Dartmoor Prison	
1815	May 24	Mississippi River	Battle of the Sink Hole	Last land battle of war, between Missouri Rangers and Sauk warriors led by Black Hawk, near Cuivre River's mouth, Missouri Territory.
1815	Jun 30	naval	USS Peacock versus East India Company ship Nautilus	Final naval engagement of the war. U.S. sloop Peacock fired on and seriously damaged East India brig Nautilus in the Straits of Sunda. British captain Boyce informed the U.S. ship commander the Treaty of Ghent had been signed on Dec 24, 1814, but the U.S. ship opened fire anyway.

== See also ==
- Bibliography of the War of 1812
- Timeline of the American Revolution

== Bibliography ==
- Mahon, John K. The War of 1812. Gainesville, FL: University of Florida Press, 1972. ISBN 0-306-80429-8.
- Malcomson, Robert. Historical Dictionary of the War of 1812. Lanham, MD: The Scarecrow Press, 2006. ISBN 978-0-8108-5499-4.
