= Battle of Florida =

Battle of Florida may refer to:

- Capture of HMS Epervier, an 1814 naval battle off the coast of Cape Canaveral, Florida, during the War of 1812
- Battle of La Florida, a battle fought at Florida, Santa Cruz Department, during the Bolivian War of Independence in 1814
- Battle of Olustee, the largest battle fought in Florida during the American Civil War in 1863
- Battle of Florida, one of two battles fought near the town of Florida, Missouri, during the American Civil War
- Lightning–Panthers rivalry, a rivalry between the Tampa Bay Lightning and Florida Panthers of the National Hockey League, often called the Battle of Florida
