= Essex Decision =

1805 ruling by the High Court of Admiralty

The Essex Decision was a ruling made by the British High Court of Admiralty on 22 May 1805 regarding the seizure of the American merchant vessel Essex. The ruling cited the Rule of 1756, which stated that neutral nations in wartime were only permitted to carry goods that they were permitted to carry in peacetime. Essex was ruled to have violated the Rule of 1756. The ruling led to a sharp increase in British seizures of American merchantmen and was one of the causes of the War of 1812.

== Background ==
The Napoleonic Wars created a shipping void in both Britain and France due to cargo vessels being drafted into military service and relaxed mercantilist policies. With Britain and France engaged in economic warfare against each other, American merchant ships helped fill the shipping void and per capita credits in the balance of payments more than tripled due to stimulated overseas commerce.

== Decision ==
The Rule of 1756 made an important distinction; trading with the enemy was permissible so that trade carried out in peacetime was not interrupted while trading for the enemy was not permissible. The British reserved the right to interfere with trade that would not have occurred in peacetime. Since American vessels were not allowed to carry cargo to a country directly from its colonies, they would often stop at an American port to evade the British prohibition. The Lords Commissioners of Appeal in Prize Causes ruled that a brief stop at an American port did not neutralize an enemy cargo when the intended final destination was another enemy port. Essex was captured while carrying cargo from the French West Indies to France and therefore its seizure was legal under British law.

== Aftermath ==
The Essex Decision led to a series of trade restrictions to impede American trade with France and its allies that resulted almost 1,500 American ships found violating the restrictions being seized by British authorities. These seizures fueled growing tensions between Britain and the United States.

The United States contested the trade restrictions, claiming they violated international law. Congress and President Thomas Jefferson were fearful of becoming entangled in war and declared the Embargo Act of 1807. This prohibited the United States from trading with all foreign ports. This attempt to coerce Britain economically backfired as drastic declines in US export values and trade earning ensued. With mounting pressure in American port cities, the Non-Importation Act of 1809 was passed to partially open trade. This specifically prohibited trade with Britain, France and their colonies.

Continuing seizures of American ships by the British along with several other disputes led to the outbreak of the War of 1812. During the war the British captured more than 1,000 American ships and blockaded almost the entire United States coastline.

== See also ==
- Rule of 1756
- Napoleonic Wars
- Origins of the War of 1812
