= Battle of Stonington =

Military engagement between American and British forces during the War of 1812

- Part of the Chesapeake campaign during the War of 1812
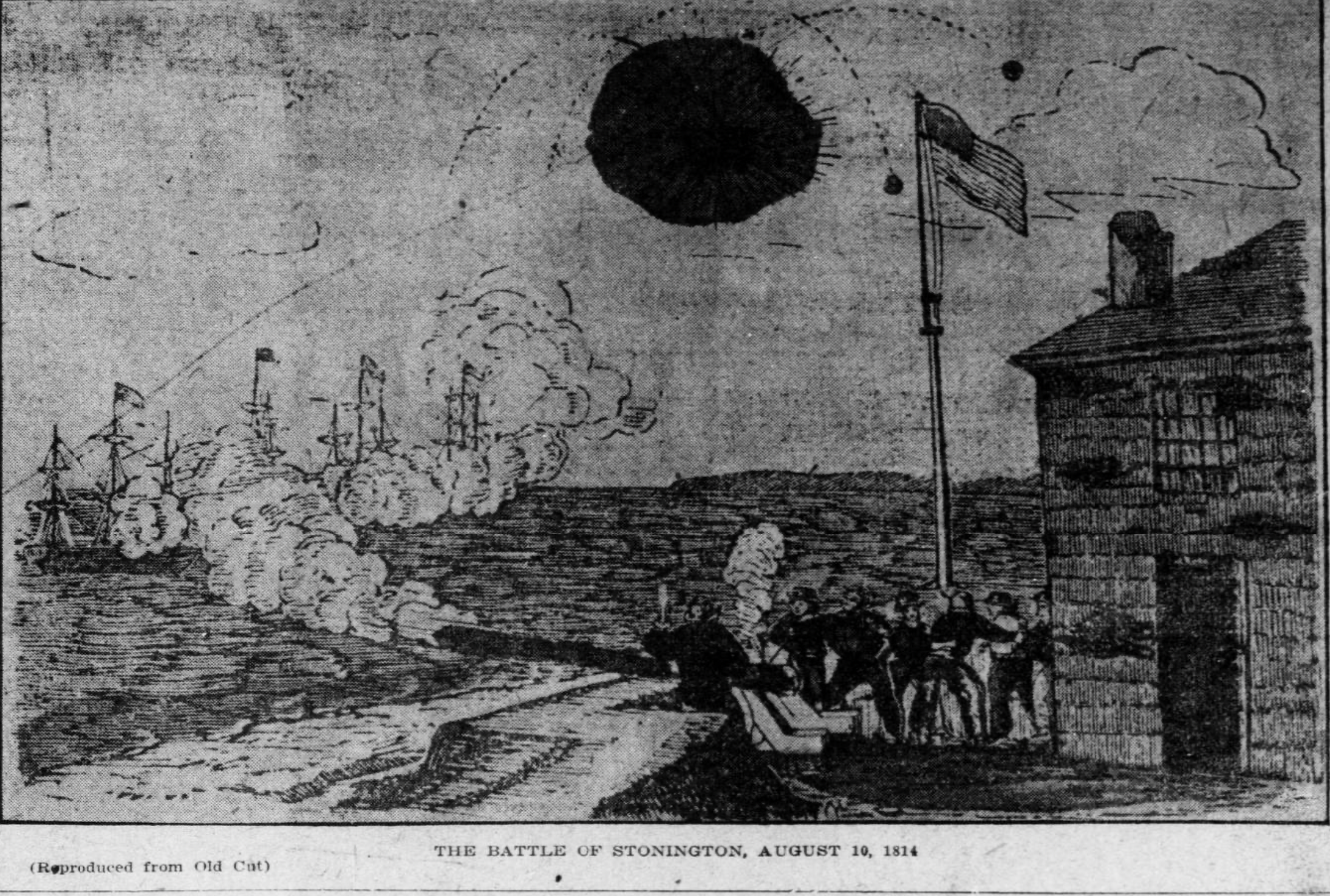
- Illustration of the battle
Date	9–12 August 1814
Location	Stonington, Connecticut, United States
Result	American victory

Belligerents
United States	United Kingdom

Commanders and leaders
Jeremiah Holmes	Sir Thomas Hardy

Units involved
Connecticut militia Local residents of Stonington	HMS Ramillies; HMS Pactolus; HMS Dispatch; HMS Terror

Strength
20 men (initially); 3 cannons	Around 1,275 men 4 warships

Casualties and losses
1 died of wounds 6 wounded	21 killed 50 wounded 1 brig-sloop severely damaged Several landing barges damaged
- 3 civilians killed

The Battle of Stonington was an engagement between British and American forces during the Chesapeake campaign of the War of 1812 where Stonington residents and local militia resolutely returned fire for three days repulsing a British attack on the small community of Stonington, resulting in many British casualties but few American casualties despite facing overwhelming odds.

== Battle ==
The Stonington Battle Flag, which was flown during the battle

=== First day ===
At mid afternoon on 9 August 1814, 4 ships of the Royal Navy under the command of Sir Thomas Hardy appeared off of Stonington Point. At 5:30pm, Hardy sent an ultimatum to the town of Stonington which read, "Not wishing to destroy the unoffending inhabitants residing in the town of Stonington, one hour is granted them from the receipt of this to remove out of town." The selectmen of Stonington replied to the ultimatum with a note that read, "We shall defend the place to the last extremity; should it be destroyed, we shall perish in its ruins." Women and children took their belongings and fled Stonington while the men stayed behind to set a tar barrel smoke signal in order to alert militia units in other nearby towns. At 6:00pm, 4 men, William Lord, Asa Lee, George Fellows, and Amos Denison manned 3 cannons, two of which were 18-pounder long guns that were leftovers from the American Revolutionary War They were later joined by 16 militiamen from Mystic, Connecticut, including Captain Jeremiah Holmes who would lead the defenders. Holmes had been impressed into the Royal Navy years earlier which had given him knowledge know being an accurate gunner. Town officials sent messengers to all neighboring towns seeking gunpowder and reinforcements. At 8:00pm, Terror opened fire on the town while the defenders fired back with their 18-pounder guns. The bombardment lasted until midnight.

=== Second day ===
During the night, the HMS Dispatch moved within half a mile of the coast. At dawn, the Royal Navy resumed bombardment for one hour. According to an eyewitness account, shells blasted the American flag from its pole, shattered the barricade, and tore up dirt around the little fort but despite that, the defenders stayed at their posts until they ran out of powder, after which they retrieved the flag, disabled one of the cannons in order to prevent it from being captured, and retreated. At 8:00am, gunpower and reinforcements had arrived from New London, Connecticut. After returning to the barricade, the American defenders nailed their flag to the flag pole, drilled out the disabled cannon, and returned fire on the British fleet. One of the cannon shots managed to hit HMS Dispatch below the water line, severely damaging her and killing several British sailors. The damage dealt forced HMS Dispatch to withdraw to a safer distance. The bombardment continued for four hours and the flag was shot seven times. Also during the bombardment, 19 year old Frederick Denison was wounded by flying debris and John Miner was wounded by a powder burn. Denison would later die of his wounds while Miner became permanently blind in one eye. After the end of the bombardment, though the battle was not yet over, the Americans celebrated as if they had already won. Due to a temporary ceasefire, the British did not immediacy bombard town again. The ceasefire was called by two men who had been sent by the magistrates of Stonington to meet with Hardy and find out the reason as to why the British were attacking Stonington in the first place. Hardy claimed that the reason why the British were attacking Stonington was because men from Stonington had been providing torpedoes that United States Navy had used against British ships at Long Island Sound and that the wife of British vice-consul James Stewart was being held captive in new London. According to historian Frances M. Caulkins, two men received Hardy's claims with "with surprise, contempt, and indignation." The men told Hardy that they had not launched any torpedoes and that they did not have Mrs. Stewart. However, Hardy told the men that if they did not have Mrs. Stewart by the next day at 8:00am, he wound destroy Stonington. The two men then rowed back to the town and prepared for the next bombardment.

=== Third day ===
At 8:00am, the magistrates of Stonington (under another ceasefire), told Hardy that they could not effect a release of Mrs. Stewart. Hardy then extended the ceasefire until noon, saying that if Mrs. Stewart was not released he would destroy the town. At noon, the second ceasefire expired and the British resumed the bombardment with HMS Terror launching her bombs. The bombardment which lasted until the night.

=== Final day ===
At 8:00am, HMS Pactolus and HMS Ramillies bombarded the town but most of their cannonballs either fell short or overshot their targets. At noon, the British ships withdrew.

== Aftermath ==
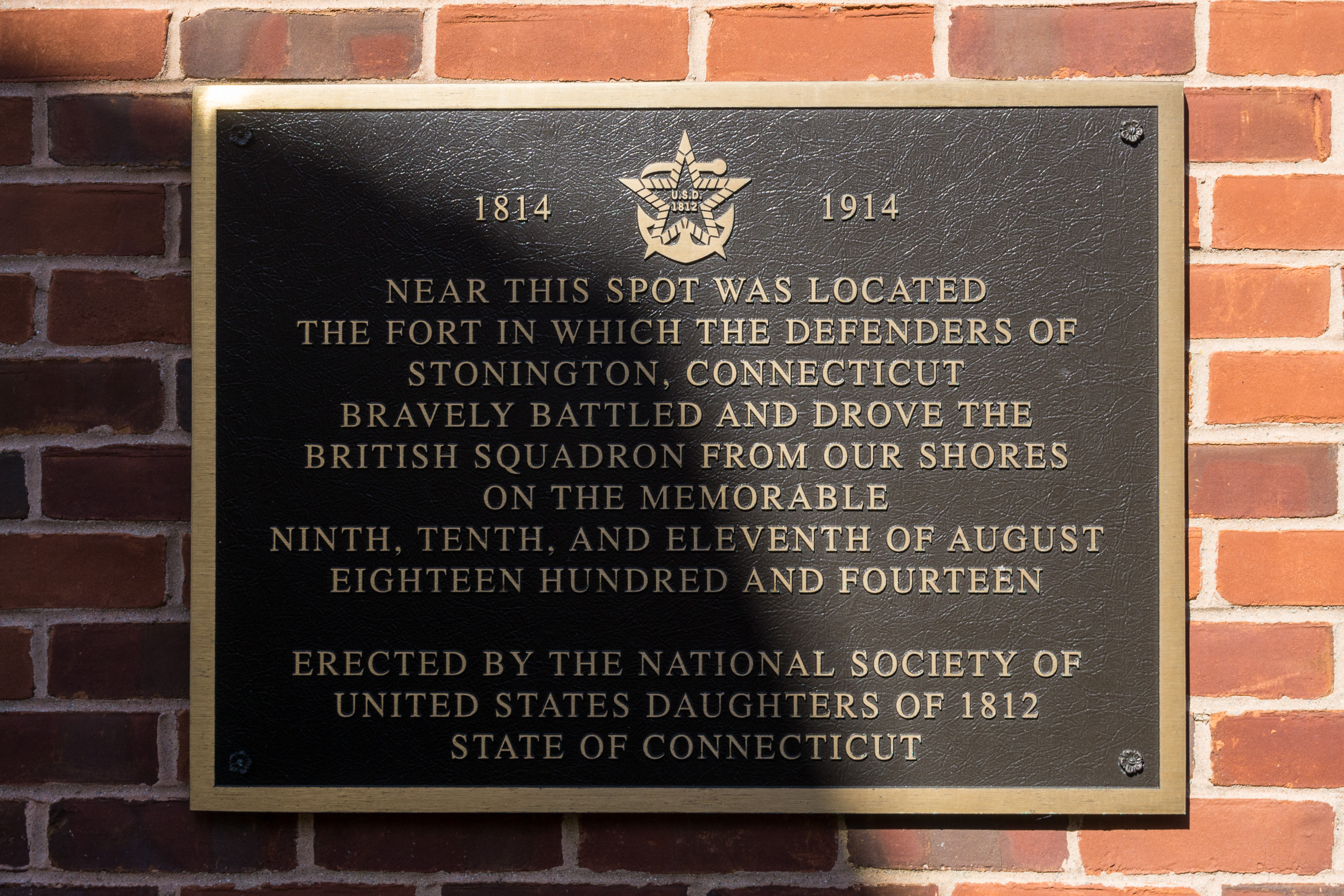
Plaque commemorating the engagement

=== Casualties ===
British losses included 21 killed and 50 wounded. Thomas Barrett Powers, a British midshipman who was killed during the battle, was buried at the Stonington Cemetery. The brig-sloop HMS Dispatch had also been severely damaged while several landing barges had also been damaged. American losses were surprisingly light, 1 who died of wounds after the battle and 6 who were wounded. 3 civilians were also killed during the bombardment.
