= Chesapeake campaign =

Naval campaign of the War of 1812

- Part of the War of 1812
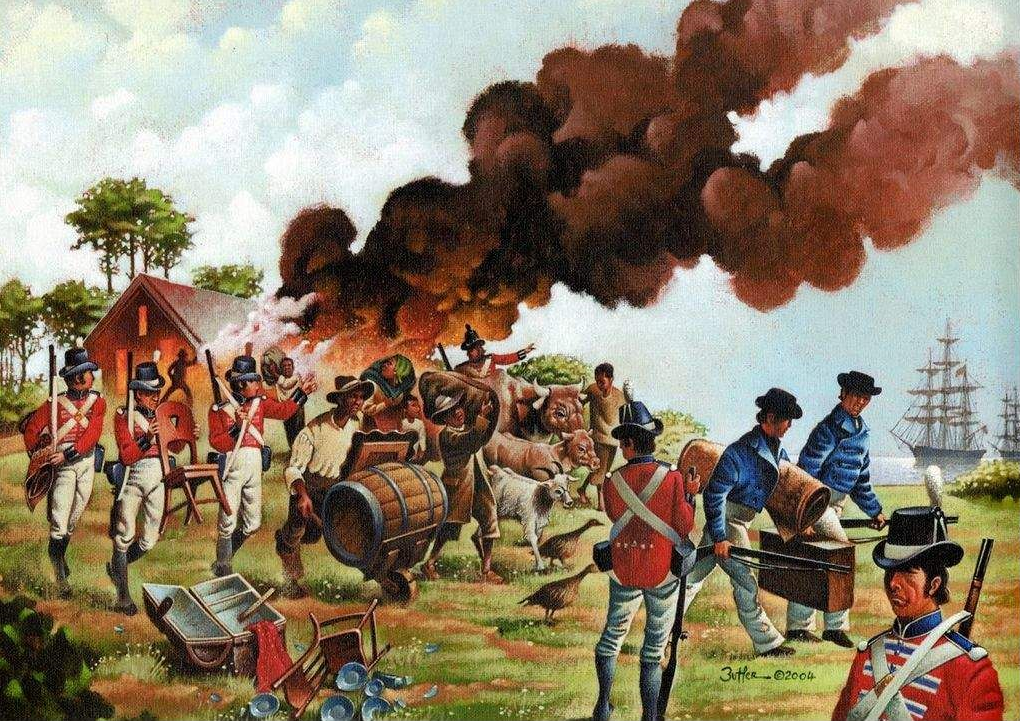
- Smoke rising from a building after facilities and ships on the Chesapeake Bay were attacked by the British
- Operational scope: Strategic offensive
- Location: Atlantic Coast of the United States; 37°8′N 76°1′W
- Planned by: (United Kingdom) Admiral Sir John Warren
- Objective: Destroy naval resources, vessels, forts, dockyards and arsenals; impose a full naval blockade in order to seize ships and powder magazines from Charleston to New York
- Date: 23 April 1813 – 14 September 1814
- Executed by: Royal Navy
- Location within the United States

The Chesapeake campaign, also known as the Chesapeake Bay campaign, of the War of 1812 was a British naval campaign that took place from 23 April 1813 to 14 September 1814 on and around the Delaware and Chesapeake bays of the United States.

== Battles ==
The Chesapeake campaign was a strategic offensive of the Royal Navy designed to destroy American naval resources, vessels, forts, dockyards and arsenals; and impose a naval blockade of the Atlantic Coast to seize ships and powder magazines from Charleston to New York.

The Chesapeake campaign battles: (Note: Most of the information in this list has been extracted from Robert Malcomson's excellent "Historical Dictionary of the War of 1812," augmented in some cases by information from other Wikipedia articles and from John Mahon's "The War of 1812.")

Rappahannock (3 April 1813)
A British foray up the Rappahannock River, which empties into Chesapeake Bay forty miles north of Hampton, Virginia, during which they captured or destroyed fourteen American ships.

Havre de Grace (3 May 1813)
A raid conducted by a flotilla of boats under Rear Admiral George Cockburn. When Maryland militia resisted the landing at Havre de Grace, the Royal Marines burned and looted homes, burned a warehouse and appropriated or killed livestock. At the Principio Foundry they destroyed a number of guns and the works in which they had been manufactured.

Craney Island (22 June 1813)
A battle fought on an island at the mouth of the Elizabeth River, in which a British landing party failed to overcome a much smaller force of Americans defending the island. This defensive victory thwarted a British attempt to occupy the port city of Norfolk.

Hampton (25–26 June 1813)
The British occupation of Hampton, Virginia, following their failure to secure Craney Island. During the one-day occupation of the town, the British took guns, ammunition, wagons, horses, livestock and other foodstuffs. French troops that were part of the force were reported to have participated in looting, vandalism, raping and killing. British casualties were 5 killed, 33 wounded and 10 missing.

Ocracoke (11–16 July 1813)
A British naval operation in the Ocracoke Inlet, a channel through the Outer Banks off the coast of North Carolina into Pamlico Sound, a route used by American merchantmen during the British blockade of Chesapeake Bay. The raid captured a number of American vessels and confiscated stores and livestock from the villages of Ocracoke and Portsmouth.

Pettipaug (7–8 April 1814)
A British small boat action up the Connecticut River to burn the privateer fleet at Pettipaug (now Essex). Captain Richard Coote led a force of 136 British sailors and marines in six boats up the river, burning 25 American vessels and capturing two, with the loss of only two men. The raid devastated American privateering capabilities.

Pongoteague (30 May 1814)
A British amphibious attack on an American battery that had been installed on a bluff at Pongoteague Creek and manned by Virginia militia, in the part of Virginia that extends south from Maryland and separates Chesapeake Bay from the Atlantic Ocean.

Cedar Point (1 June 1814)
An indecisive encounter near the mouth of the Patuxent River between an American flotilla and British ships from Rear Admiral Sir George Cockburn's fleet. Although both sides maneuvered for advantage and exchanged shots at long range, the Americans broke off action before any damage was done to ships of either side.

Stonington (9–12 August 1814)
British vessels HMS Ramillies, HMS Pactolus, HMS Dispatch, and HMS Terror under the command of Sir Thomas Hardy bombarded the borough of Stonington, Connecticut. The residents resolutely returned fire for three days, resulting in many British casualties but few American casualties.

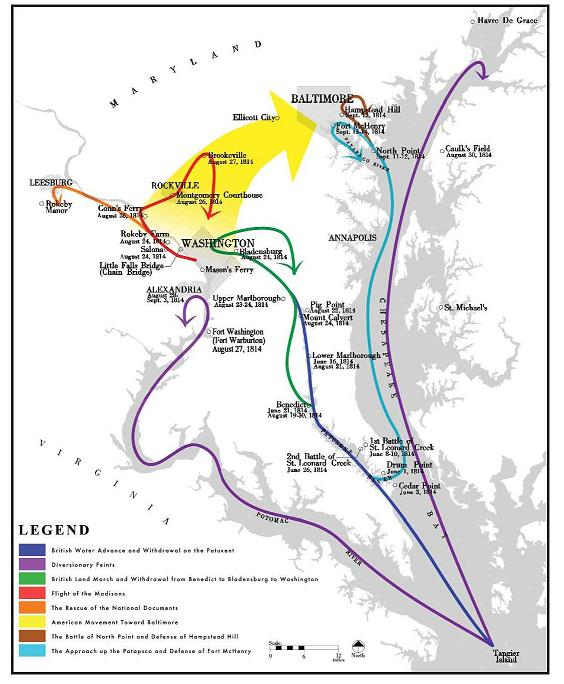
Detail of the seat of war on Chesapeake Bay

Alexandria (17 August–6 September 1814)
An expedition up the Potomac River by a squadron of British ships commanded by Captain James Gordon, intended as a diversion from the expedition up the Patuxent River that culminated in the burning of Washington. Gordon's raid resulted in the expulsion of the American forces at Fort Washington, Maryland, the uncontested occupation of the prosperous port of Alexandria, Virginia and the capture an abundance of prizes and cargoes.

Bladensburg (17–29 August 1814)
The Americans' worst battle of the war during which a British force of 1,500 troops routed an American force of nearly 7,000, leaving Washington undefended. The Burning of Washington an occupation of the capital by a British force of 4,000 to 5,000 troops from Rear Admiral Sir George Cockburn's fleet in Chesapeake Bay, usually interpreted as retaliation for the American Battle of York when US force burned and looted York in 1813. The British burned the Capitol Building, the Library of Congress, the White House and buildings housing the Treasury and War Departments but the only private building set afire was one from which the British had been fired upon.

North Point (12 September 1814)
A battle that thwarted the British plan to follow up their victories at Bladensburg and Washington with the capture of Baltimore. The British landing party, under the command of Maj. Gen. Robert Ross met the American force, under the command of Brig. Gen. John Stricker, at the narrowest point of the peninsula leading from North Point to Baltimore. Although the Americans eventually were forced to retreat, they were able to do so in good order having inflicted significant casualties on the British, killing Gen. Ross and demoralizing his troops. This combination prompted Col. Arthur Brooke, in command following Ross's death, to delay the advance against Baltimore, buying valuable time to properly prepare for the defense of the city as Gen. Stricker retreated to the main defenses to bolster the existing force.

McHenry (13 September 1814)
The failed British attempt during the attack on Baltimore to subdue Fort McHenry, which blocked access to Baltimore Harbor. When it became evident that Fort McHenry would not surrender, the British land assault was called off, and the troops that had landed at North Point were withdrawn.

== See also ==
- List of War of 1812 battles
- Attacks on the United States

== Bibliography ==
- Mahon, John K. The War of 1812. Gainesville, FL: University of Florida Press, 1972. ISBN 0-306-80429-8.
- Malcomson, Robert. Historical Dictionary of the War of 1812. Lanham, MD: The Scarecrow Press, 2006. ISBN 978-0-8108-5499-4.
