= Ocracoke raid =

British naval attack on the United States during the War of 1812

- Part of the War of 1812
- Location: Portsmouth and Ocracoke Island, North Carolina; 35°24′N 76°19′W
- Commanded by: (United Kingdom) Rear-Admiral George Cockburn
- Objective: Cooperate with Admiral Warren's blockade of the Chesapeake Bay
- Date: July 11–16, 1813
- Executed by: Royal Navy
- Outcome: British victory
- Location within North Carolina

The Ocracoke raid, also known as the Attack on the Port of Ocracoke, was a successful British amphibious attack conducted by Rear-Admiral George Cockburn between July 11 and 16, 1813, during Admiral Sir John Warren's Chesapeake campaign. The raid was undertaken to support the British blockade of the Chesapeake Bay in the War of 1812 and targeted Ocracoke, North Carolina.

== Background ==
During the War of 1812, British Admiral Sir John Warren followed up his attacks on Craney Island (June 22, 1813) and Hampton (June 25–26, 1813), Virginia, with a raid on the North Carolina coast. To this end, he dispatched seven vessels and 500 troops under Rear-Admiral George Cockburn to the port of Ocracoke with orders to destroy American merchant shipping and armed vessels there.

== The raid ==
On July 11, 1813, Rear-Admiral George Cockburn's naval squadron arrived off Ocracoke Inlet, North Carolina, carrying the 102d Regiment of Foot, commanded by Lieutenant-Colonel Charles Napier, and artillery. Although the British managed to capture two privateers, the Anaconda and Atlas, the revenue cutter Mercury outran the British ships, reaching New Bern in time to thwart any surprise strike on the mainland. The Royal Navy remained until July 16, sailing before the detached militia could reach Portsmouth and Ocracoke Island. Cockburn then sailed southward and established himself for the winter at Dungeness on Cumberland Island, Georgia. Besides the loss of property, Cockburn gave refuge to many fugitive slaves, whom he transported to the West Indies or Florida.

== Aftermath ==
The Ocracoke raid was considered a success as it greatly alarmed the people of North Carolina, who could offer little resistance, and were harassed by incessant militia calls. Governor William Hawkins later requested, but failed to receive, federal assistance in building and manning forts to protect the state from another invasion.

== See also ==
- List of War of 1812 battles
