= United States declaration of war on the United Kingdom =

1812 act passed by the 12th United States Congress

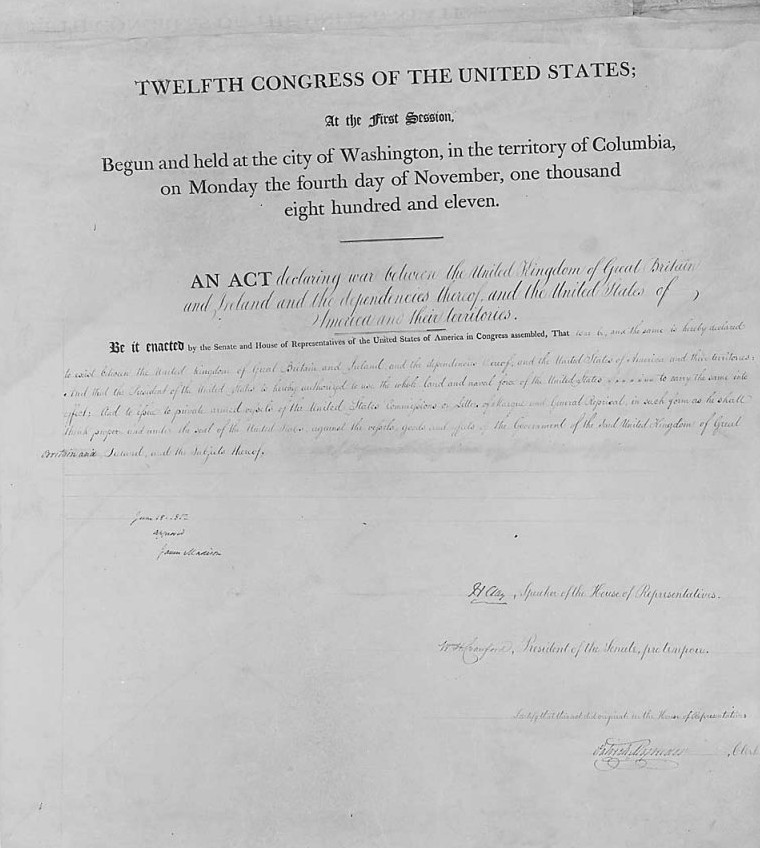
Photograph of the declaration

An Act Declaring War between the United Kingdom of Great Britain and Ireland and the Dependencies Thereof and the United States of America and Their Territories was passed by the 12th United States Congress on June 18, 1812, thereby beginning the War of 1812. It was signed by James Madison, the 4th president of the United States.

== Historical background ==
=== Foreign tensions ===
The United States and Britain had a history of tension and disagreement. However, according to American Battlefield Trust, the War of 1812 was an avoidable conflict, which was a "result of ineffective foreign policy." In the early 1800s, Thomas Jefferson, US president from 1801 to 1809, was in the pursuit of conquering more territory. In 1803, the Napoleonic Wars began when Britain declared war on France. Many Royal Navy deserters fled to the US and began working onboard American merchantmen, and attempts by the British navy to reclaim them angered US public opinion. To alleviate this problem, Thomas Jefferson created the Embargo Act, restricting trade with Great Britain. However, it did not resolve the issue. In addition to impressment and trade restrictions, the Americans were angered by Britain's support for Native peoples resisting U.S. settler-colonial expansion. Eventually these tensions mounted, causing US president James Madison to declare war on the United Kingdom in June 1812. The US started by attacking Canada, which they assumed was a key source of support for Indigenous people. Another reason the US targeted Canada was to rid North America of British influence.

=== Government ===
The US government in 1812 was run by President James Madison, who represented the Democratic-Republican Party. President Madison was a key driving force in the declaration of war. As president, he created a declaration of war speech, which he presented to Congress, arguing that war was a necessary measure. The House and Senate were significantly divided in political opinion, resulting in passing votes only exceeding opposing votes by a small margin.

=== Pressure from Congressmen ===
A group of congressmen, known as the "War Hawks", were a key driving force of the War of 1812. The War Hawks efforts ultimately persuaded President James Madison to declare war on the United Kingdom. This young group, composed of mainly people from Southern and Western States was led by Henry Clay and John C. Calhoun. Specifically, Henry Clay was elected the speaker of the house by the US Congress in 1811. Henry Clay stated that war, "calamitous as it generally is, seems to me the only alternative worthy of our Country. I should blush to call myself an American were any other adopted." The War Hawks ensured their involvement in political progress by keeping representatives in all congressional committees, such as the "Foreign Relations Committee, and War Hawks chaired the Naval, Ways and Means, and Military Affairs Committees."

The War Hawks expressed hostility towards Great Britain due to a variety of issues. They not only accused the British government of overstepping boundaries regarding its restriction of American trade during the Napoleonic Wars, but also argued that British control of Canada presented a security risk to the US. Additionally, the War Hawks rallied around the issue of American seaman impressment which they claimed violated maritime rights. Another grievance that the War Hawks emphasized was the pressure coming from Indigenous people on the western frontier. They worried about the Indigenous resistance to white settlement and the US involvement in supporting their efforts.

== Key policies and events preceding the War Declaration ==
The United States' declaration of War against Great Britain was a result of various events and disagreements. Much of the conflict originated because the US was caught in between Great Britain and France who were at war.

=== Rule of 1756 ===
The Rule of 1756 was enacted during the Seven Years' War. The rule permitted Great Britain to block all French ports to prevent France's transportation of goods with other continents, which could support its war effort. It also declared that all neutral nations "could only carry items that had been transported in times of peace." Any country that disobeyed the rules would be committing an act of war. Americans resented the rule because it prohibited US trade and re-export with its ally France. It also gave the British justification to board and take over US ships. As a result, the US created the Non-importation Act of 1806, which was intended to address the violation of US neutral trade rights by preventing the importation of British goods. Great Britain's response did not improve matters, as they established more blockades.

=== Embargo Act of 1807 and Non-Intercourse Act (1809) ===
The US created the Embargo Act of 1807 to address British and French interference with US shipping. Officially, the act "closed US ports to all exports and restricted imports from Great Britain." Nonetheless, the act did not work as planned. It was later lifted in 1809 and was replaced by the Non-Intercourse Act. This act allowed the US to trade with nations other than Great Britain and France. Neither act ended British interference with US shipping.

=== Chesapeake Affair ===
The Chesapeake–Leopard affair demonstrates a major conflict between the US and Great Britain. The Chesapeake Affair occurred in early 1807. In spite of trade restrictions imposed on France, the British discovered two French vessels attempting to trade with the US in Chesapeake Bay. The ship, known as Chesapeake, was thought to have aided Royal Navy seaman in deserting their roles in the Navy. As a result of this treason, Great Britain issued a search on the vessel, which was refused by the ship's commander. In response to this refusal, the Chesapeake ship was attacked, resulting in the commander and 17 others being injured, and 3 people killed. Four Royal Navy deserters were detained, with three being punished and one, a British subject, being hanged. This event evoked anger and mistrust in the US, contributing to the decision to declare war.

=== Tecumseh’s War and First Nation resistance ===
Another contributing factor to the US declaring war was conflict with First Nations people in America. The US was angry at Great Britain for trading goods with First Nations. In particular, they disapproved of Great Britain's strong relationship with the chief of Shawnee, Tecumseh. The US were suspicious of the relationship, considering that Tecumseh led a fight against the US, which is now known as Tecumseh's War. Therefore, the US correlated the success and strength of the resistance with the support of Great Britain.

== President James Madison's speech to Congress ==
President James Madison's speech to the Senate and House of Representatives discussed affairs committed by Great Britain. Throughout the speech, he touched on four key arguments, including "impressment, illegal blockades, the orders in the council, and British involvement in Indian warfare". He emphasized that war is justified because of these affairs, while supporting his argument by claiming that peaceful approaches in the past proved ineffective. He also suggested that Great Britain would resort to war if they were to face similar challenges, and claimed that not declaring war would undermine US Sovereignty. Essentially, the speech conveyed the importance of fulfilling "the rights, interests, and the honour of [the] country."

=== Impressment ===
The first aspect of President James Madison's speech is impressment. He declared that impressment is an injustice to US citizens, since they would be forced to fight for people that had 'oppressed them' in the past." This discontent is evident when he stated, "British cruisers have been in the continued practice of violating the American flag on the great highway of nations, and of seizing and carrying off persons sailing under it, not in the exercise of a belligerent right founded on the law of nations against an enemy, but of a municipal prerogative over British subjects." This quote effectively compares the ocean to a great highway that connects many nations. This conveyed his concern with the fact that the British have prevented communication and commerce with other countries.

=== Illegal blockades ===
The second aspect of President James Madison's speech addressed the illegal blockades that were implemented to limit France's resources in the war. Although the blockades were intended to weaken France's defences, he highlighted the blockade's negative effect on the economic interests of the US, since it limited the importation and exportation of commerce. He also shared that without US participation in foreign markets of trade, the economy would inevitably undergo challenges. Furthermore, he described how the act would influence agricultural activities in the US, thus impacting the livelihoods of US citizens. President James Madison discussed this concern when he stated, "Under pretended blockades, without the presence of an adequate force and sometimes without the practicability of applying one, our commerce has been plundered in every sea, the great staples of our country have been cut off from their legitimate markets, and a destructive blow aimed at our agricultural and maritime interests."

=== The Orders in the Council ===
The third aspect of President James Madison's speech addressed the impact of British Orders in the council. He discussed the impact that Great Britain's system of blockades had on the US economy. He demonstrates his dislike of the Orders in the Council when he states that it " has been molded and managed as might best suit its political views, its commercial jealousies, or the avidity of British cruisers."

=== British involvement in Indigenous warfare ===
The fourth aspect of President James Madison's speech addressed how Indigenous warfare impacted US livelihood. He emphasized the resistance against white settlement from Indigenous people. The speech also referenced the support that Great Britain was providing Indigenous people and the threat this posed to the US.

== House and Senate support ==
Two maps showing the Congressional vote to declare war, in the House of Representatives and Senate, respectively

The House and Senate permit the president to sign the war declaration. With respect to the War of 1812, congress did approve of the declaration of war, though it was the closest vote in all of America's declarations of war. In the House, the vote supporting war was 79 to 49, which illustrated the divided opinion. Similarly, in the Senate there was a lack of unanimous support from the senators. They were divided based on their political affiliation resulting in 19 senators voting in favour and 13 opposing it.

The Republicans were the only political party that voted in favour of war. They contributed 98 votes. The Republicans were believed to have voted with domestic and partisan interests in mind. Many may have also voted in favour hoping that the war would unite Republicans. On the other hand, all Federalists were opposed to the war. Interestingly, Federalists were primarily from North Eastern states. This preference is likely due to the economic consequences that people would face if war were to occur. Unlike Western states, their livelihoods relied heavily on the coast's resources. Specifically, sailors and trades; "coopers, blacksmiths, sailmakers, shipwrights, rope makers, and chandlers" would suffer from battles on the coast. Additionally, farmers would experience challenges, due to their reliance on foreign trade. Therefore, due to a lack of unanimous agreement between voters, and the strong push from the president, the War of 1812 is commonly referred to as "Mr. Madison’s War."

== Official declaration of war ==
The declaration of war against the United Kingdom was signed by President James Madison on June 18, 1812. This represented the beginning of the War of 1812.

Be it enacted by the Senate and House of Representatives of the United States of America in Congress assembled, That war be and is hereby declared to exist between the United Kingdom of Great Britain and Ireland and the dependencies thereof, and the United States of America and their territories; and that the President of the United States is hereby authorized to use the whole land and naval force of the United States to carry the same into effect, and to issue to private armed vessels of the United States commissions or letters of marque and general reprisal, in such form as he shall think proper, and under the seal of the United States, against the vessels, goods, and effects of the government of the said United Kingdom of Great Britain and Ireland, and the subjects thereof.
