= Raid on Sodus =

Raid On Sodus
- Part of War of 1812
Date	June 19–20, 1813
Location	Sodus (village), New York
Result	British victory

Belligerents
United Kingdom	United States

Commanders and leaders
Commadore James Lucas Yeo.	Captain E. Hull

Strength
100	40

Casualties and losses
3 killed 7 wounded	1 killed 3 wounded 2 captured

On June 19, 1813, 100 British soldiers landed outside Sodus (village), New York. 40 Militia put up some resistance but were forced to retreat. Because of the resistance the entire village was looted and burnt.

== Background ==
After the Second Battle of Sacket's Harbor on May 29 Isaac Chauncey recalled the American fleet on Lake Ontario back to harbour as a defence against future British attacks. That gave the British ships on the lake room to operate on the New York coastline. On June 13 the British raided the nearby Charlotte. With the British landing at Charlotte, the Americans were certain a landing would soon occur at Sodus. A large force of Militia stayed there until the morning of the 19th when no attack came. In the morning the majority of the militia left. When 5 British ships appeared off the coast riders raced to call back the militia back but failed.

== Action ==
On the night of June 19, 100 British soldiers landed undetected near the village of Sodus New York. Captain E. Hull and his 40 New York militia hid behind a treeline watching the village's approach. From the tree line, the Americans opened fire on the British who opened fire in return. After a short firefight leaving 3 British killed and 7 wounded and 1 American killed, 3 wounded, and 2 captured the Americans retreated. The British retreated back to their ships as well.

== Aftermath ==
With the Americans gone, the next day the British landed once again unopposed. They entered the village and looted 230 barrels of flour and a few of pork and whiskey. All public property was looted and the entire village burnt. No resistance was put up by the New York militia at Charlotte and so the town didn't receive the same punishment as Sodus.

== Sources ==
- "The Battle of Sodus Point-War of 1812".
- Clark, Lewis (1883). Military History of Wayne County, NY, The County in the Civil War. Lewis H.Clark, Hulett & Gaylurd.
