= Rule of 1756 =

Policy of the Kingdom of Great Britain

The Rule of 1756 or Rule of the War of 1756 was a policy of the Kingdom of Great Britain, and later the United Kingdom of Great Britain and Ireland that was promulgated during the Seven Years' War (1756–1763). It ruled that Britain would not trade with neutral nations who were also trading with the enemy.

The rule was devised and approved by the British Admiralty courts, which maintained that if a neutral nation were prohibited from a particular type of trade during peacetime, then it would also be prohibited from the same variety during wartime. The rationale behind this rule was that the neutral nation was aiding the enemy. The rule has never been ratified by international law.

The rule was one of the causes of the War of 1812.

== Contents ==
During the Seven Years' War, France and Britain initially fought over disputed North American colonies. The war became both a naval and economic battle, spreading throughout French and British colonies around the world. The Rule of 1756 was created to hinder all French trade to its West Indies colonies. In 1757 the London Chronicle estimated that French West Indies trade had fallen by 70% since the opening of hostilities. This 70% drop in trade was triggered by British privateering of French ships. France was not able to supply its West Indies colonies due to Britain's naval superiority and lock on trade routes. The French government in Versailles proposed that French goods be carried on neutral ships from the United Provinces or Spain. French goods would be able to reach their intended destinations and the neutral nation would benefit from participating in the exclusive market. France was forced to remove the trade monopoly it had with its colonies and allowed other nations to supply them with goods. In 1758 the Rule of 1756 was amended to eliminate the loophole France had discovered. The Rule of 1756 was adjusted to its modern form permitting the privateering of all ships carrying French goods. British privateers received permission to act even more aggressively at sea and were granted permission to conduct searches of neutral vessels.

== Effect on War of 1812 ==
In the years leading up to the War of 1812, France and Britain were at war. Tensions between these two European countries had arisen following the French Revolution. In 1805 the antiquated Rule of 1756 would be reinstated by Britain. American shippers had been taking advantage of the hostilities in Europe. American ports were used as a stopping point while shipping goods to French and Spanish islands in the West Indies. By stopping at an American port, the Americans could evade seizure under the Rule of 1756. Britain noticed this loophole and amended the Rule of 1756 with the Essex Case. In doing so, British seizure of American ships greatly increased. This heightened seizure put a real strain on Anglo-American relations and was a significant factor contributing to the War of 1812. France countered the Essex Case by creating its own version of the law, called the Berlin Decree. The Berlin Decree and Essex Case resulted in the seizure of nearly 1,500 American ships.
