= Origins of the War of 1812 =

Inciting motives for the War of 1812

The origins of the War of 1812 (1812–1815), between the United States and the United Kingdom's British Empire and their First Nation allies, have been long debated. Multiple factors led to the US declaration of war on Great Britain that began the War of 1812:

- Trade restrictions introduced by the UK under the orders in council of 1807 to impede trade with France, with whom Britain was at war (the US contested the restrictions as illegal under contemporary international law).
- The impressment (forced recruitment) of seamen on US vessels into the British Royal Navy (men whom Britain claimed were British subjects).
- British military support for American Indian tribes who were offering armed resistance against the US expansion of the American frontier in the Northwest Territory.
- A possible desire by the US to annex some or all of Canada.
- US desire to uphold national honor in the face of what they considered to be British insults, such as the Chesapeake affair.

American expansion into the Northwest Territory (now Ohio, Indiana, Michigan, Illinois, Wisconsin, and northeast Minnesota) was impeded by Native American raids. Some historians maintain that an American goal in the war was to annex some or all of Canada, a view many Canadians still share. However, many argue that inducing the fear of such a seizure was merely an American tactic, which was designed to obtain a bargaining chip.

Some members of the British Parliament and dissident American politicians such as John Randolph of Roanoke claimed that American expansionism, rather than maritime disputes, was the primary motivation for the American declaration of war. That view has been retained by some historians.

Although the British made some concessions before the war on neutral trade, they insisted on the right to reclaim their deserting sailors. The British also had long had a goal to create a large "neutral" Native American state that would cover much of Ohio, Indiana, and Michigan. They made the demand as late as 1814 at the Ghent Peace Conference, but they lost battles that would have upheld those claims.

== British goals ==
The UK's British Empire was engaged in a life-and-death war against Napoleon Bonaparte's France and believed it could not allow the Americans to help the enemy through trade, regardless of their lawful rights as neutrals to do so. As Horsman explained, "If possible, England wished to avoid war with America, but not to the extent of allowing her to hinder the British war effort against France. Moreover... a large section of influential British opinion, both in the government and in the country, thought that America presented a threat to British maritime supremacy."

=== Defending British North America ===
According to Historian Andrew Lambert, the defense of British North America was Britain's primary goal: "The British had no interest in fighting this war, and once it had begun, they had one clear goal: keep the United States from taking any part of Canada". Britain's policy was to effect the end of the war, through continuous campaigning, which would influence the people of the United States and government policy.

=== Defeating Napoleon ===
All parties were committed to the defeat of France, which required sailors and thus impressment, as well as all-out commercial war against France, which caused the restrictions that were imposed on American merchant ships. On the question of trade with America, the British parties split. As Horsman argues, "Some restrictions on neutral commerce were essential for England in this period. That this restriction took such an extreme form after 1807 stemmed, not only from the effort to defeat Napoleon, but also from the undoubted jealousy of America's commercial prosperity that existed in England. America was unfortunate in that, for most of the period from 1803 to 1812, political power in England was held by a group that was pledged not only to the defeat of France, but also to a rigid maintenance of Britain's commercial supremacy." That group was weakened by Whigs, friendly to the US in mid-1812, and the policies were reversed, although the US had already declared war. By 1815, Britain was no longer controlled by politicians dedicated to commercial supremacy and so that cause had vanished.

The British were hindered by weakened diplomats in Washington, such as David Erskine, who were unable to represent a consistent British policy, and by communications that were so slow that the Americans did not learn of the reversal of policy until they had declared war.

Americans proposed a truce based on the British ending impressment, but the latter refused because they believed they needed those sailors. Horsman explained, "Impressment, which was the main point of contention between England and America from 1803 to 1807, was made necessary, primarily, because of England's great shortage of seamen for the war against Napoleon. In a similar manner, the restrictions on American commerce imposed by England's Orders in Council, which were the supreme cause of complaint between 1807 and 1812, were one part of a vast commercial struggle being waged between England and France."

=== Creation of an Indian barrier state between the US and Canada ===
The British also had the long-standing goal of creating an Indian barrier state, a large "neutral" Indian state that would cover most of the Old Northwest to be a barrier between the Western US and Canada. It would be independent of the US and under the tutelage of the British, who would use it to block American expansionism and to build up their control of the fur trade.

The British continued to make that demand as late as 1814, during the Ghent Peace Conference. However, they dropped the demand since their position had been weakened by the collapse of Tecumseh's Confederacy after the Battle of the Thames. Also, they simply no longer considered the goal to be worth war against the US, although much of the proposed buffer state had remained largely under British and Indian control throughout the war. However, Britain insisted on including the right for Indians to return to lands they had lost after 1811, which was included in clause IX, even though Britain had doubts that this would be upheld by America.

== American goals ==
There were several immediate stated causes for the American declaration of war:

- A series of trade restrictions, the Orders in Council (1807), were introduced by Britain to impede American trade with France, which was at war with Britain. The US contested those restrictions as illegal under international law.
- The impressment (forced recruitment) of US citizens into the Royal Navy.
- The British military support for American Indians, who were offering armed resistance to the US.
- An unstated but powerful motivation by the US was the need that was felt to uphold national honor in the face of British insults, such as the Chesapeake affair.
- A possible US desire to annex Canada.

=== British support for Indian raids ===
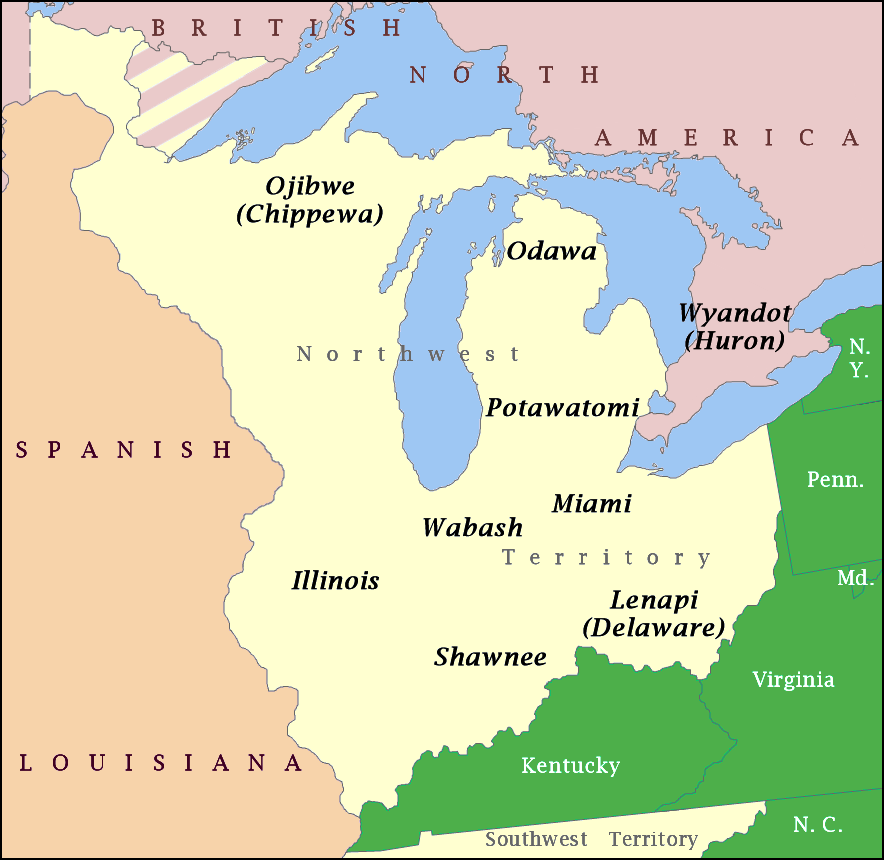
General distribution of Native American tribes in the Northwest Territory c. 1792

Indians based in the Northwest Territory, now the states of Ohio, Indiana, Illinois, Michigan, and Wisconsin, had organized in opposition to American settlement and were being supplied with weapons by British traders in Canada. Britain was not trying to provoke a war and, at one point, cut its allocations of gunpowder to the tribes, but it was trying to build up its fur trade and friendly relations with potential military allies. Britain had ceded the area to the United States in the Treaty of Paris (1783) but had the long-term goal of creating a "neutral" or buffer Indian state in the area to block further American growth. The Indian nations generally followed Tenskwatawa, the Shawnee Prophet and the brother of Tecumseh. Since 1805, he had preached his vision of purifying his society by expelling the "Children of the Evil Spirit" (the American settlers).

According to Pratt,

There is ample proof that the British authorities did all in their power to hold or win the allegiance of the Indians of the Northwest with the expectation of using them as allies in the event of war. Indian allegiance could be held only by gifts, and, to an Indian, no gift was as acceptable as a lethal weapon. Guns and ammunition, tomahawks and scalping knives were dealt out with some liberality by British agents. Raiding grew more common in 1810 and 1811. Westerners in Congress found the raids intolerable and wanted them to be permanently ended.

=== American expansionism ===
Historians have considered the idea that American expansionism was one cause of the war. The American expansion into the Northwest Territory (now Ohio, Indiana, Illinois, Michigan, and Wisconsin) was being blocked by Indians, which was a major cause animating the Westerners. The American historian Walter Nugent, in his history of American expansionism, argues that expansion into the Midwest "was not the only American objective, and indeed not the immediate one area but it was an objective."

==== Annexation ====
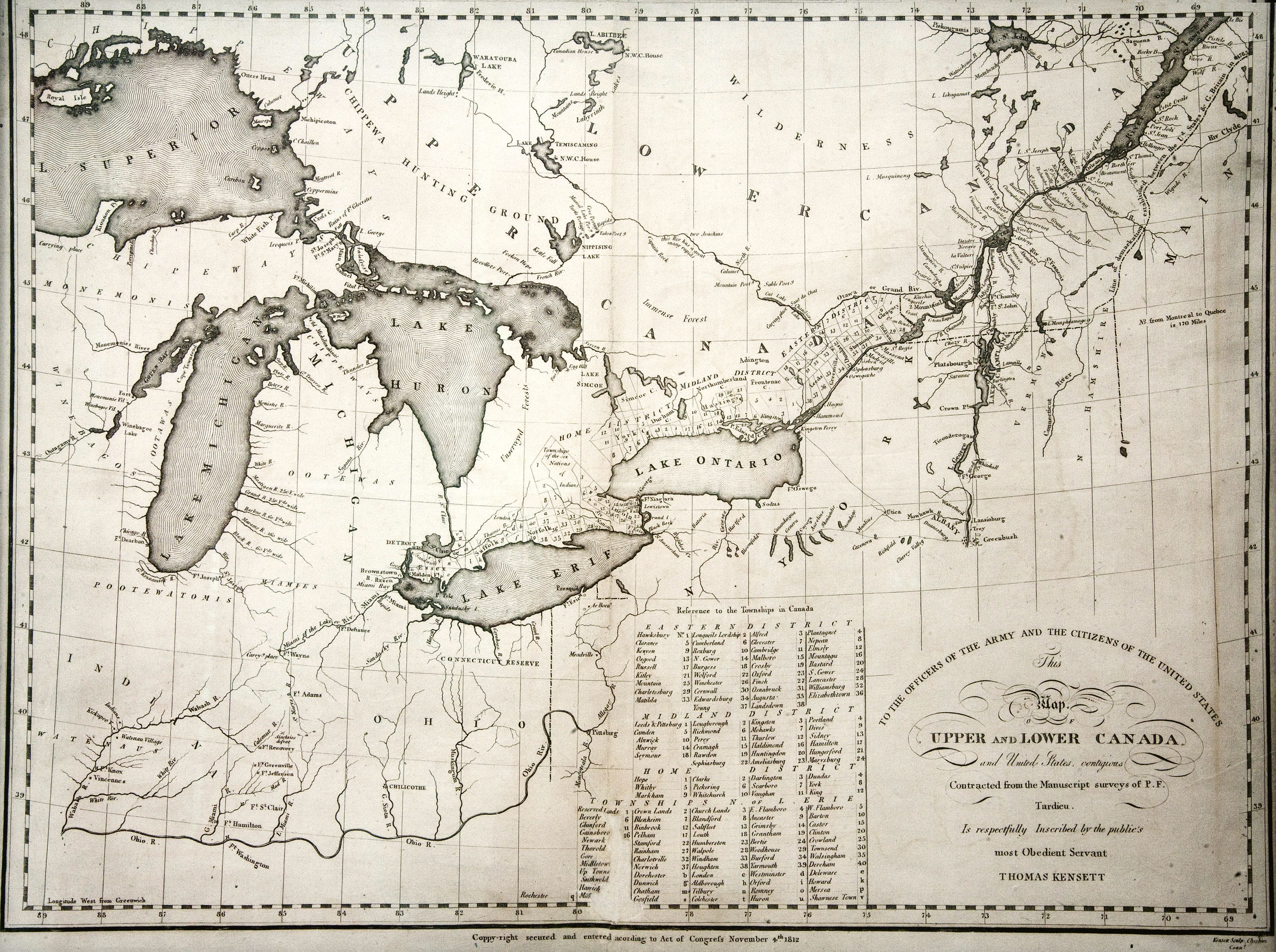
Upper and Lower Canada, c. 1812

More controversial is whether an American war goal was to acquire Canadian lands, especially what is now Western Ontario, permanently or whether it was planned to seize the area temporarily as a bargaining chip. The American desire for Canada has been a staple in Canadian public opinion since the 1830s and was much discussed among historians before 1940 but has since become less popular. The idea was first developed by historian Louis M. Hacker and refined by the diplomatic specialist Julius Pratt.

In 1925, Pratt argued that Western Americans were incited to war by the prospect of seizing Canada. Pratt's argument supported the belief of many Canadians, especially in Ontario, where fear of American expansionism was a major political element, and the notion still survives among Canadians.

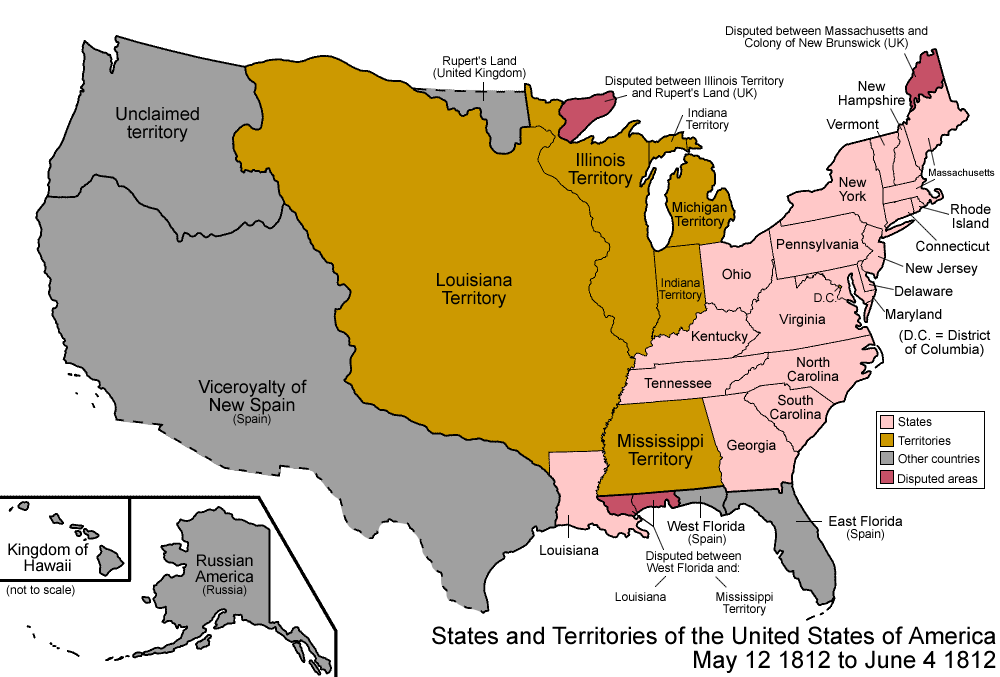
Map of the states and territories of the US from May to June 1812

In 2010, the American historian Alan Taylor examined the political dimension of the annexation issue as Congress debated whether to declare war in 1811 and 1812. The Federalist Party was strongly opposed to war and to annexation, as were the Northeastern states. The majority in Congress was held by the Democratic-Republican Party, which was split on the issue. One faction wanted the permanent expulsion of Britain and the annexation of Canada. John Randolph of Roanoke, representing Virginia, commented, "Agrarian greed, not maritime right, urges this war. We have heard but one word - like the whippoorwill's one monotonous tone: Canada! Canada! Canada!"

The other faction, based in the South, said that acquiring new territory in the North would give it too much power and so opposed the incorporation of Canada since its Catholic population was viewed as "unfit by faith, language and illiteracy for republican citizenship." The Senate held a series of debates and twice voted on proposals that explicitly endorsed annexation, neither of which passed. However, the second failed only because of a proviso stating that Canada could be returned to British rule after it had been annexed. War was declared with no mention of annexation, but widespread support existed among the War Hawks for it. Some Southerners supported expansionism; Tennessee Senator Felix Grundy considered it essential to acquire Canada to preserve domestic political balance and argued that annexing Canada would maintain the free state-slave state balance, which might otherwise be ended by the acquisition of Florida and the settlement of the southern areas of the new Louisiana Purchase.

Even James Monroe and Henry Clay, key officials in the government, expected to gain at least Upper Canada from a successful war.

American commanders like General William Hull and Alexander Smyth issued proclamations to Canadians stating that the war was aimed at liberating them from British oppression and announcing an intention to annex the Canadas into the United States. Hull's proclamation also threatened them with "the horrors & calamities of war" and promised to kill out of hand any white found fighting with an Indian. Smythe wrote to his troops that when they entered Canada, "You enter a country that is to become one with the United States. You will arrive among a people who are to become your fellow-citizens." These proclamations echoed similar appeals made during the American Revolution, such as the Continental Army's Letters to the Inhabitants of Canada.

==== Seizing Canada as a bargaining chip ====
Historians now generally agree that an invasion and seizure of Canada was the main American military strategy once the war had begun. With British control of the oceans, there was no other way to fight against British interests actively. President James Madison believed that food supplies from Canada were essential to the British Overseas Empire in the West Indies and that an American seizure would be an excellent bargaining chip at the peace conference. During the war, some Americans speculated that they might as well keep all of Canada. Thomas Jefferson, for example, was now out of power but argued that the expulsion of British interests from nearby Canada would remove a long-term threat to American republicanism.

The New Zealander historian J.C.A. Stagg argued that Madison and his advisers believed that the conquest of Canada would be easy and that economic coercion would force the British to come to terms by cutting off the food supply for their highly-valuable West Indies sugar colonies. Furthermore, the possession of Canada would be a valuable bargaining chip. Stagg suggested that frontiersmen demanded the seizure of Canada not because they wanted the land, since they had plenty of it, but because the British were thought to be arming the Indians and thus blocked settlement of the West.

Hickey flatly stated, "The desire to annex Canada did not bring on the war." Brown (1964) concluded, "The purpose of the Canadian expedition was to serve negotiation not to annex Canada."

Alfred Leroy Burt, a Canadian scholar but also a professor at an American university, agreed completely by noting that Foster, the British minister to Washington, also rejected the argument that annexation of Canada was a war goal. However, Foster also rejected the possibility of a declaration of war but had dinner with several of the more prominent War Hawks and so his judgement on such matters can be questioned.

However, Stagg stated that "had the War 1812 been a successful military venture, the Madison administration would have been reluctant to have returned occupied Canadian territory to the enemy." Other authors concur, with one stating, "Expansion was not the only American objective, and indeed not the immediate one. But it was an objective."

"The American yearning to absorb Canada was long-standing.... In 1812 it became part of a grand strategy."

Another suggested, "Americans harbored 'manifest destiny' ideas of Canadian annexation throughout the Nineteenth Century." A third stated, "The [American] belief that the United States would one day annex Canada had a continuous existence from the early days of the War of Independence to the War of 1812 [and] was a factor of primary importance in bringing on the war."

Another stated that "acquiring Canada would satisfy America's expansionist desires".

The historian Spencer Tucker wrote, "War Hawks were eager to wage war with the British, not only to end Indian depredations in the Midwest but also to seize Canada and perhaps Spanish Florida."

=== Inhabitants of Ontario ===
Most of the inhabitants of Upper Canada (now Ontario) were Americans, but some of them were exiled United Empire Loyalists, and most of them were recent immigrants. The Loyalists were extremely hostile to American annexation, and the other settlers seem to have been uninterested and to have remained neutral during the war. The Canadian colonies were thinly populated and only lightly defended by the British Army, and some Americans believed that the many in Upper Canada would rise and greet the American invading army as liberators. The combination implied an easy conquest. Once the war began, ex-President Thomas Jefferson warned that the British presence posed a grave threat and pointed to "The infamous intrigues of Great Britain to destroy our government... and with the Indians to Tomahawk our women and children, prove that the cession of Canada, their fulcrum for these Machiavellian levers, must be a sine qua non at a treaty of peace." He predicted in late 1812 that "the acquisition of Canada this year, as far as the neighborhood of Quebec, will be a mere matter of marching, and will give us the experience for the attack on Halifax, the next and final expulsion of England from the American continent."

== Violations of U.S. rights ==
The long wars between Britain and France (1793–1815) led to repeated complaints by the US that both powers violated American rights, as a neutral power, to trade with both sides. Furthermore, Americans complained loudly that British agents in Canada were supplying munitions to hostile Native American tribes living in US territories.

In the mid-1790s, the Royal Navy, short of manpower, began to board American merchant ships to seize American and British sailors from American vessels. Although the policy of impressment was supposed to reclaim only British subjects, the law of Britain and most other countries defined nationality by birth. However, American law allowed individuals who had been resident in the country for some time to adopt US citizenship. Therefore, many individuals were British by British law but American by American law. The confusion was compounded by the refusal of Jefferson and Madison to issue any official citizenship documents. Their position was that all persons serving on American ships were to be regarded as US citizens and so no further evidence was required. That stance was motivated by the advice of Albert Gallatin, who had calculated that half of the US deep-sea merchant seamen (9,000 men) were British subjects. Allowing the Royal Navy to reclaim those men would destroy both the US economy and the government's vital customs revenue. Any sort of accommodation would jeopardize those men and so concords such as the proposed Monroe-Pinkney Treaty (1806) between the US and Britain were rejected by Jefferson.

To fill the need for some sort of identification, US consuls provided unofficial papers. However, they relied on unverifiable declarations by the individual concerned for evidence of citizenship, and the large fees paid for the documents made them a lucrative sideline. In turn, British officers, who were short of personnel and convinced, somewhat reasonably, that the American flag was covering a large number of British deserters, tended to treat such papers with scorn. Between 1806 and 1812, about 6,000 seamen were impressed and taken against their will into the Royal Navy; 3,800 of them were later released.

== Honor ==
A number of American contemporaries called it "the "Second War for Independence." Henry Clay and John C. Calhoun pushed a declaration of war through Congress by stressing the need to uphold American honor and independence. Speaking of his fellow Southerners, Calhoun told Congress that they

"are not prepared for the colonial state to which again that Power [Great Britain] is endeavoring to reduce us. The manly spirit of that section of our country will not submit to be regulated by any foreign Power."

The historian Norman Risjord emphasized the central importance of honor as a cause the war. Americans of every political stripe saw the need to uphold national honor and to reject the treatment of the United States by Britain as a third-class nonentity. Americans talked incessantly about the need for force in response. That quest for honor was a major cause of the war in the sense that most Americans who were not involved in mercantile interests or threatened by Indian attack strongly endorsed the preservation of national honor.

The humiliating attack by HMS Leopard against USS Chesapeake in June 1807 was a decisive event. Many Americans called for war, but Jefferson held back and insisted that economic warfare would prove more successful, which he initiated, especially in the form of embargoing or refusing to sell products to Britain. The policy proved a failure by not deterring the British, but it seriously damaged American industry and alienated the mercantile cities of the Northeast, which were seriously hurt.

Historians have demonstrated the powerful motive of honor to shape public opinion in a number of states, including Massachusetts, Ohio, Pennsylvania, Tennessee, and Virginia, as well as the territory of Michigan. On 3 June 1812, the House Committee on Foreign Affairs, chaired by the pro-war extremist John C. Calhoun, called for a declaration of war in ringing phrases by denouncing Britain's "lust for power," "unbounded tyranny," and "mad ambition." James Roark wrote, "These were fighting words in a war that was in large measure about insult and honor." Calhoun reaped much of the credit.

In terms of honor, the conclusion of the war, especially the spectacular defeat of the main British invasion army at New Orleans, restored the American sense of honor. The historian Lance Banning wrote:

National honor, the reputation of republican government, and the continuing supremacy of the Republican party had seemed to be at stake.... National honor had [now] been satisfied.... Americans celebrated the end of the struggle with a brilliant burst of national pride. They felt that they had fought a second war for independence, and had won. If little had been gained, nothing had been lost in a contest the greatest imperial power on the earth.

According to J.C.A. Stagg, a historian from New Zealand,

Initially, in the studies of Norman Risjord, these values were described as an outrageous sense of "national honor" provoked by the conduct of Great Britain toward the United States on the high seas, but in the work of Roger Brown, concerns about "national honor" became part of a larger commitment to "republicanism" itself—both in the institution of the ruling Jeffersonian Republican Party and in the belief that republicanism as a national creed would be in jeopardy unless Americans made another effort to vindicate the independence that had supposedly been won in 1783.

== US economic motivations ==
The failure of Jefferson's embargo and of Madison's economic coercion, according to Horsman, "made war or absolute submission to England the only alternatives, and the latter presented more terrors to the recent colonists. The war hawks came from the West and the South, regions that had supported economic warfare and were suffering the most from British restrictions at sea. The merchants of New England earned large profits from the wartime carrying trade, in spite of the numerous captures by both France and England, but the western and southern farmers, who looked longingly at the export market, were suffering a depression that made them demand war."

== Prewar incidents ==
This dispute came to the forefront with the Chesapeake–Leopard affair of 1807, when the British warship HMS Leopard fired on and boarded the American warship USS Chesapeake, killed three, and carried off four deserters from the Royal Navy. (Only one was a British citizen and was later hanged; the other three were American citizens and were later returned but the last two only in 1812.) The American public was outraged by the incident, and many called for war to assert American sovereignty and national honor.

The Chesapeake–Leopard affair followed closely on the similar Leander affair, which had resulted in Jefferson banning certain British warships and their captains from American ports and waters. Whether in response to that incident or the Chesapeake-Leopard affair, Jefferson banned all foreign armed vessels from American waters except for those bearing dispatches. In December 1808, an American officer expelled HMS Sandwich from Savannah, Georgia; the schooner had entered with dispatches for the British consul there.

Meanwhile, Napoleon's Continental System and the British Orders in Council of 1807 established embargoes that made international trade precarious. From 1807 to 1812, about 900 American ships were seized as a result. The US responded with the Embargo Act of 1807, which prohibited American ships from sailing to any foreign ports and closed American ports to British ships. Jefferson's embargo was especially unpopular in New England, whose merchants preferred the indignities of impressment to the halting of overseas commerce. The discontent contributed to the calling of the Hartford Convention in 1814.

The Embargo Act had no effect on either Britain or France and so was replaced by the Non-Intercourse Act of 1809, which lifted all embargoes on American shipping except for those bound for British or French ports. As that proved to be unenforceable, it was replaced in 1810 by Macon's Bill Number 2, which lifted all embargoes but offered that if France or Britain ceased its interference with American shipping, the US would reinstate an embargo on the other nation. Napoleon, seeing an opportunity to make trouble for Britain, promised to leave American ships alone, and the US reinstated the embargo with Britain and moved closer to declaring war. However, he had no intention of honoring his promise.

Exacerbating the situation, Sauk Indians, who controlled trade on the Upper Mississippi, were displeased with the US government after the 1804 treaty between Quashquame and William Henry Harrison ceded Sauk territory in Illinois and Missouri to the US. The Sauk felt the treaty to be unjust and that Quashquame had been unauthorized to sign away land and had been unaware of what he was signing. The establishment of Fort Madison in 1808 on the Mississippi had further angered the Sauk and led many, including Black Hawk, to side with the British before the war broke out. Sauk and allied Indians, including the Ho-Chunk (Winnebago), were very effective fighters for the British on the Mississippi and helped to defeat Fort Madison and Fort McKay in Prairie du Chien.

The Oxford historian Paul Langford looked at the decisions by the British government in 1812:

The British ambassador in Washington [Erskine] brought affairs almost to an accommodation, and was ultimately disappointed not by American intransigence but by one of the outstanding diplomatic blunders made by a Foreign Secretary. It was Canning who, in his most irresponsible manner and apparently out of sheer dislike of everything American, recalled the ambassador Erskine and wrecked the negotiations, a piece of most gratuitous folly. As a result, the possibility of a new embarrassment for Napoleon turned into the certainty of a much more serious one for his enemy. Though the British cabinet eventually made the necessary concessions on the score of the Orders in Council, in response to the pressures of industrial lobbying at home, its action came too late.... The loss of the North American markets could have been a decisive blow. As it was by the time the United States declared war, the Continental System [of Napoleon] was beginning to crack, and the danger correspondingly diminishing. Even so, the war, inconclusive though it proved in a military sense, was an irksome and expensive embarrassment which British statesman could have done much more to avert.

== Declaration of war ==
In the US House of Representatives, a group of young Democratic-Republicans, known as the "War Hawks", came to the forefront in 1811 and were led by Speaker Henry Clay of Kentucky and by John C. Calhoun of South Carolina. They advocated going to war against Britain for all of the reasons listed above but concentrated on their grievances more than on territorial expansion.

On 1 June 1812, President James Madison gave a speech to the US Congress that recounted American grievances against Britain but did not specifically call for a declaration of war. After Madison's speech, the House of Representatives quickly voted (79 to 49) to declare war, and the Senate did the same by 19 to 13. The conflict formally began on 18 June 1812, when Madison signed the measure into law. It was the first time that the US had declared war on another nation, and the congressional vote was the closest-ever vote to declare war in American history. None of the 39 Federalists in Congress voted for the war, whose critics later referred to it as "Mr. Madison's War".

== See also ==
- Timeline of the War of 1812
- Presidency of Thomas Jefferson
- Presidency of James Madison
- Opposition to the War of 1812
- Results of the War of 1812
- War of 1812
- War of 1812 bibliography

== Sources ==
- Adams, Henry. History of the United States during the Administrations of James Madison (5 vol 1890–91; 2 vol Library of America, 1986). ISBN 0-940450-35-6 Table of contents, the classic political-diplomatic history
- Benn, Carl. The War of 1812 (2003).
- Brown, Roger H. The Republic in Peril: 1812 (1964). on American politics
- Burt, Alfred L. The United States, Great Britain, and British North America from the Revolution to the Establishment of Peace after the War of 1812. (1940)
- Carlisle, Rodney P.; Golson, J. Geoffrey (1 February 2007). Manifest Destiny and the Expansion of America. ABC-CLIO. ISBN 978-1-85109-833-0.
- Goodman, Warren H. "The Origins of the War of 1812: A Survey of Changing Interpretations," Mississippi Valley Historical Review (1941)28#1 pp 171–86. in JSTOR
- Hacker, Louis M. "Western Land Hunger and the War of 1812," Mississippi Valley Historical Review, (1924), 10#3 pp 365–95. in JSTOR
- Heidler, Donald & J, (eds) Encyclopedia of the War of 1812 (2004) articles by 70 scholars from several countries
- Hickey, Donald. The War of 1812: A Forgotten Conflict. University of Illinois Press, 1989. ISBN 0-252-06059-8, by leading American scholar
- Hickey, Donald R. Don't Give Up the Ship! Myths of the War of 1812. (2006) ISBN 0-252-03179-2
- Hickey, Donald R. ed. The War of 1812 : writings from America's second war of independence (2013), primary sources online free to borrow
- Horsman, Reginald. The Causes of the War of 1812 (1962).
- Kaplan, Lawrence S. "France and Madison's Decision for War 1812," The Mississippi Valley Historical Review, Vol. 50, No. 4. (Mar., 1964), pp. 652–671. in JSTOR
- Maass, Richard W. "'Difficult to Relinquish Territory Which Had Been Conquered': Expansionism and the War of 1812," Diplomatic History (Jan 2015) 39#1 pp 70–97 doi: 10.1093/dh/dht132
- Nugent, Walter (2008). Habits of Empire:A History of American Expansionism. New York: Random House. ISBN 978-1-4000-7818-9.
- Perkins, Bradford. Prologue to war: England and the United States, 1805–1812 (1961) full text online free, detailed diplomatic history by American scholar
- Perkins, Bradford. Castlereagh and Adams: England and the United States, 1812·1823 (1964) excerpt; online review
- Perkins, Bradford. (1962). The causes of the War of 1812. National honor or national interest? online free to borrow
- Pratt, Julius W. A History of United States Foreign Policy (1955)
- Pratt, Julius W. (1925). Expansionists of 1812. New York: Macmillan.
- Pratt, Julius W. "Western War Aims in the War of 1812," Mississippi Valley Historical Review, 12 (June, 1925), 36–50. in JSTOR
- Risjord, Norman K. "1812: Conservatives, War Hawks, and the Nation's Honor," William and Mary Quarterly, 18#2 ( 1961), 196–210. in JSTOR
- Smelser, Marshall. The Democratic Republic 1801–1815 (1968) general survey of American politics & diplomacy
- Stagg, John C. A. (1983). Mr. Madison's War: Politics, Diplomacy, and Warfare in the Early American Republic, 1783–1830. Princeton, New Jersey: Princeton University Press. ISBN 9780691047027.
- Stagg, John C. A. "James Madison and the 'Malcontents': The Political Origins of the War of 1812," William and Mary Quarterly (Oct., 1976) in JSTOR
- Stagg, John C. A. "James Madison and the Coercion of Great Britain: Canada, the West Indies, and the War of 1812," in The William and Mary Quarterly (Jan., 1981) in JSTOR
- Steel, Anthony. "Anthony Merry and the Anglo-American Dispute about Impressment, 1803-6." Cambridge Historical Journal 9#3 (1949): 331-51 online.
- Taylor, Alan. The Civil War of 1812: American Citizens, British Subjects, Irish Rebels, & Indian Allies (2010)
- Taylor, George Rogers, ed. The War of 1812: Past Justifications and Present Interpretations (1963) online free
- Trautsch, Jasper M. "The Causes of the War of 1812: 200 Years of Debate," Journal of Military History (Jan 2013) 77#1 pp 273–293
- Tucker, Spencer C., ed. (2011). "The Encyclopedia of North American Indian Wars, 1607–1890: A Political, Social, and Military History [3 volumes]". The Encyclopedia of North American Indian Wars, 1607–1890: A Political, Social, and Military History. ABC-CLIO. p. 1097. ISBN 978-1-85109-603-9.
- Updyke, Frank A. The diplomacy of the War of 1812 (1915) online free
