= Capture of Mobile =

1813 War of 1812 capture by American forces

- Part of the War of 1812
Date	13 April 1813
Location	Mobile, Spanish Florida
Result	American victory
Territorial changes	United States occupation (and later annexation) of Mobile

Belligerents
United States	(Spain) Spanish Florida

Commanders and leaders
(United States) James Wilkinson	(Spain) Cayetano Pérez (surrendered)

Units involved
3rd Infantry Regiment	Fuerte Carlota garrison

Strength
600–Over 1,000 regulars 5 gunboats	80 regulars 50 cannons

Casualties and losses
None	Entire garrison surrendered

In 1813, the city of Mobile, Alabama was captured by American forces under James Wilkinson during the War of 1812.

== Background ==
In November 1803, the Mobile Act was introduced into the House of Representatives by United States House Committee on Ways and Means chairman John Randolph. The act was signed into law by President Thomas Jefferson on 24 February 1804. Even after the annexation of the Republic of West Florida in 1810 by the United States, Mobile had remained under the control of Spain. However, due to the war with Napoleon and several wars in its South American colonies, Spain was in a weakened state.

The situation was so dire that Luis de Onís, the Spanish envoy to the United States, objected in any military actions (including by Spain's allies, Britain and allied native tribes) to defend Spanish Florida as he believed that Spain could only retain control over its holdings in Florida through diplomatic means. In 1813, American President James Madison ordered General James Wilkinson to depart from New Orleans and capture Mobile from Spain.

== Capture ==
Opposing Wilkinson was Spanish Captain Cayetano Pérez. Surrounded, outnumbered, and lacking support from the Spanish government, Pérez surrendered Fuerte Carlota on 13 April 1813 to American General James Wilkinson. The American flag was raised over the fort, marking the first time that the American flag had been raised in the city of Mobile.

== Aftermath ==
After the Spanish surrender, Mobile and the surrounding area was annexed into the Mississippi Territory. On 30 August 1813, Fort Bowyer was established at Mobile Point. The capture and annexation of Mobile marked the only permanent territorial acquisition made by the United States during the War of 1812.

== See also ==
- Mobile District
- Peninsular War

== Bibliography ==
- Owsley, Frank L. Jr. (2017) [1981]. Struggle for the Gulf Borderlands: The Creek War and the Battle of New Orleans, 1812–1815 (PDF). Gainesville: University Press of Florida. ISBN 978-0-8173-1062-2.
