= USS Wasp (1813) =

Sloop-of-war of the United States Navy

History

United States
- Name: USS Wasp
- Namesake: The Wasp
- Acquired: 1813
- Commissioned: Summer 1813
- Fate: Returned to owners in 1814

General characteristics
- Type: Sloop
- Armament: 2 × 12-pounder guns

USS Wasp was a sloop that served in the U.S. Navy from 1813 to 1814.

Wasp was chartered on Lake Champlain late in the summer of 1813 and served as a tender for Commodore Thomas Macdonlough's fleet in the War of 1812 during the latter part of 1813 and into 1814. Wasp saw no combat.

As she was small and a poor sailer, the Navy returned her to her owners early in 1814. Her guns were transferred to the newly launched schooner USS Ticonderoga.
