= Capture of HMS Epervier =

- Part of the War of 1812
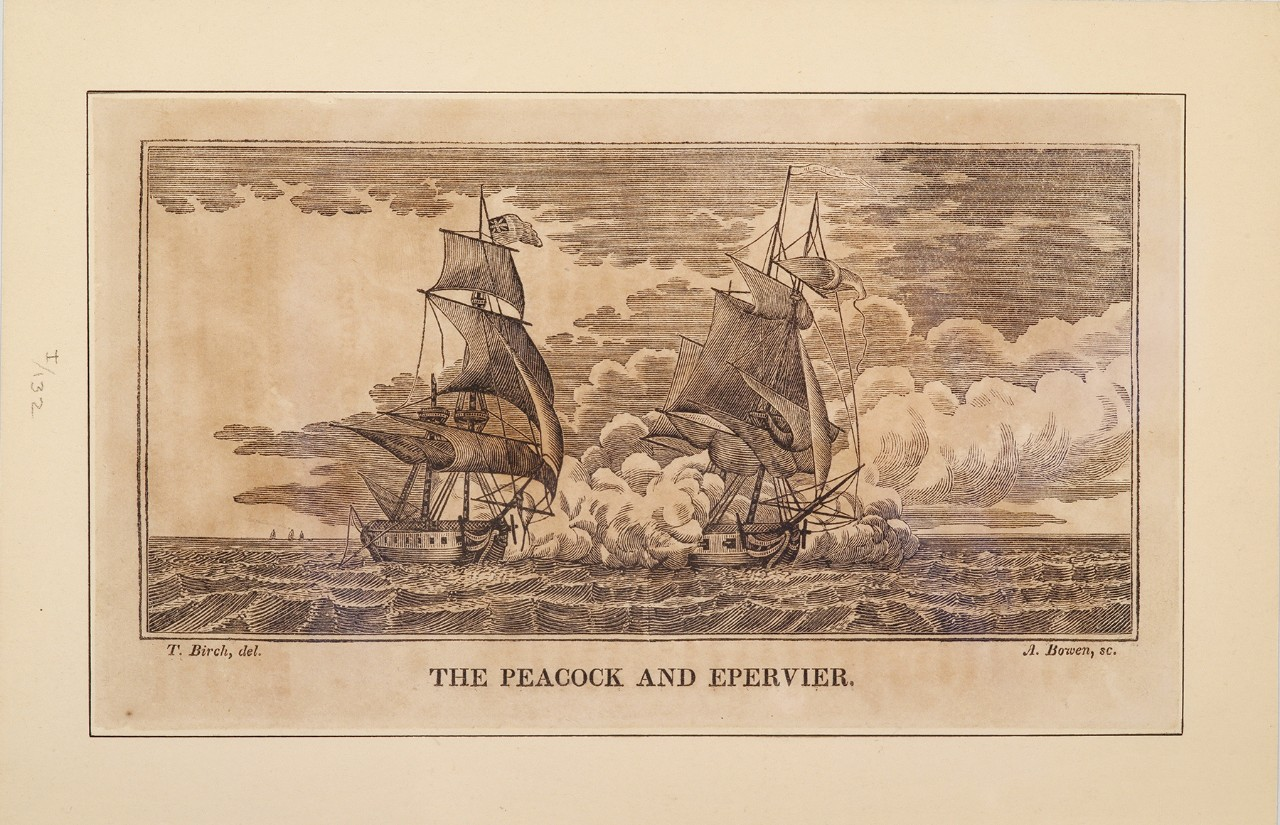
- 1820 engraving of the battle
Date	29 April 1814
Location	Off Cape Canaveral, Atlantic Ocean
Result	American victory

Belligerents
United States	United Kingdom

Commanders and leaders
Lewis Warrington	Richard Wales (surrendered)

Strength
1 sloop	1 brig-sloop

Casualties and losses
2 wounded	8 killed; 15 wounded; 1 brig-sloop captured

The capture of HMS Epervier occurred on 29 April 1814 off Cape Canaveral during the War of 1812. The United States Navy sloop USS Peacock under Master Commandant Lewis Warrington engaged the British Cruizer-class brig-sloop Epervier under Commander Richard Wales. Peacock captured Epervier after a one-sided cannonade, but the British merchant convoy she was escorting escaped.

== Prelude ==
USS Peacock was one of a class of three heavy sloops-of-war designed by William Doughty, and was named after the victory the previous year over the Royal Navy brig HMS Peacock. Peacock sortied from New York on 12 March 1814 and, having eluded the British blockade, delivered some stores to St. Marys, Georgia. Peacock was then supposed to rendezvous with the frigate USS President, but President had been unable to break out of New York. While waiting for President to appear, Warrington cruised around the Bahamas, hoping to intercept British merchant ships sailing from Jamaica.

Early on the morning of 28 April, several sail were sighted to windward. They belonged to a small convoy that had sailed from Havana on 23 April, escorted by Epervier. When the convoy sighted Peacock the merchant ships made all sail to escape, while Epervier prepared to engage. The British vessel was more lightly armed than the American. Epervier carried sixteen 32-pounder carronades and two 18-pounder carronades as bow chasers. Peacock carried twenty 32-pounder carronades and two 12-pounder guns. The ratio of the vessels' broadsides was 256 pounds to 320.

== Battle ==
As the two vessels made toward each other, the wind shifted to the southward, giving neither Peacock nor Epervier the advantage of the windward position. At about 10:20 in the morning, both ships fired their starboard broadsides on opposite tacks, aiming high to disable their opponent's rigging. Both vessels received damage aloft, after which Epervier turned downwind and engaged Peacock on a parallel course.

Peacock directed her fire against Epervier's hull with great effect. The British fire fell away rapidly, and Epervier probably scored no hits after the first broadside from the port battery. After 40 minutes, Epervier was badly damaged, with 45 shot holes in the hull, and 5 feet (1.5 m) of water in the hold. Commander Richard Wales summoned boarding parties to muster, intending to board and capture Peacock, but his crew refused. At 11:05, Epervier struck her colours. Epervier had eight men killed and 15 wounded (about 20 percent of the crew.)

== Aftermath ==
The Americans repaired the damage to Peacock's rigging within an hour. Peacock's first lieutenant took charge of the prize and succeeded in preventing it from sinking; the prize crew had the brig ready to sail by nightfall. Epervier was found to be carrying $118,000 in specie, which was private rather than Government property. The next day, the Americans sighted two British frigates. Peacock successfully decoyed them away from Epervier and also herself escaped, with the result that both vessels reached Savannah, Georgia, a few days later. The Americans repaired Epervier and took her into the United States Navy as USS Epervier. Warrington set out again in Peacock and carried out a successful raiding cruise in British waters, capturing 14 merchant vessels.

The victory of Peacock over Epervier was one of the most one-sided of the War of 1812, even though the two opposing vessels were not grossly disparate in strength. It was stated that although Peacock's fire had dismounted some of Epervier's carronades, more of them fell from their mounts when they were fired. Wales had carried out little of the gunnery practice that would have revealed defects in the guns or carriages before it was too late to remedy them. Wales had also reported disaffection and unrest among his crew and, unusually for the Royal Navy in the War of 1812, they failed in their duty to fight to their utmost. The court martial (on 20 January 1815) revealed that Epervier had the worst crew of any vessel on her station. In particular, her crew consisted mostly of invalids from the hospital. On 21 October 1814, Congress passed a resolution that in honour of their capture of Epervier, each of Peacock's officers would receive a silver medal and each of her midshipmen would receive a sword.
