= 1808 United States Senate election in Massachusetts =

- June 2, 1808

462 members of the Massachusetts General Court 232 votes needed to win
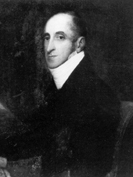

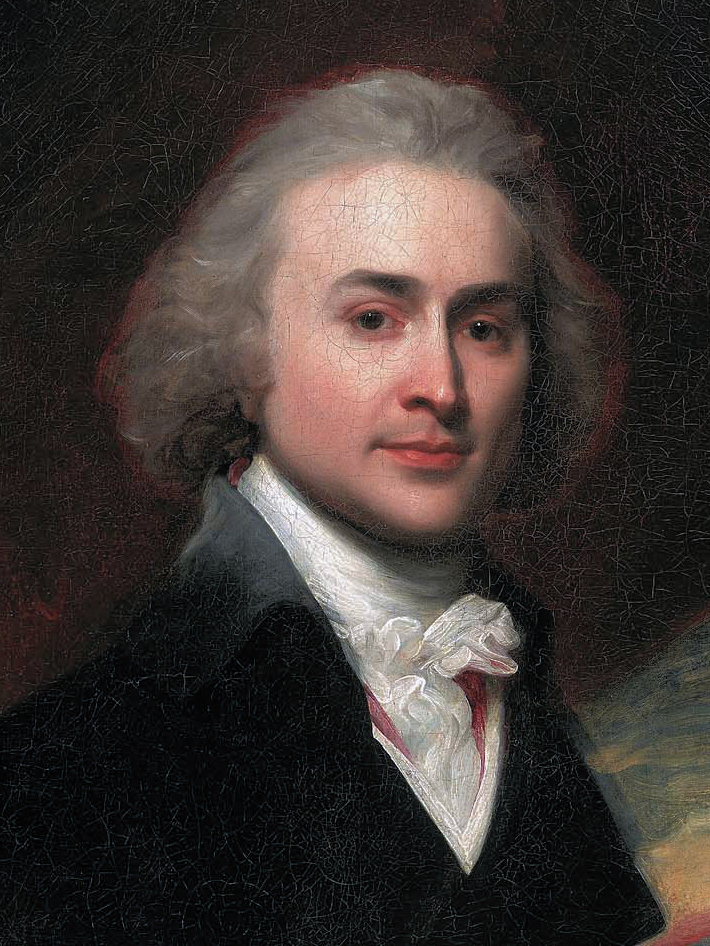
Nominee	James Lloyd	John Quincy Adams
Party	Federalist	Federalist
Electoral vote	248	213
Percentage	53.68%	46.10%
Senator before election
John Quincy Adams
Federalist
Elected Senator
James Lloyd
Federalist

The 1808 United States Senate election in Massachusetts was held on June 2, 1808.

This unusually early election was called after Federalist incumbent John Quincy Adams broke with his party over the Embargo Act of 1807. The legislature elected state senator James Lloyd to the term beginning in March 1809. Although he could have served out the remaining months of his term, Adams resigned from office to join the Democratic-Republican Party and was appointed as minister to Russia by James Madison. He would later serve as president of the United States from 1825 to 1829.

== Background ==
John Quincy Adams, son of former Federalist president John Adams, was elected senator by the Massachusetts legislature as a Federalist in 1803. At the time of his election, Adams was considered a moderate, republican member of his party, in contrast to his High Federalist colleague and intraparty rival, Timothy Pickering. Although Adams had bested Pickering in the 1803 election, Pickering was elected to the state's other seat in the Senate to complete the term of Dwight Foster. Adams's six-year term was scheduled to expire in March 1809; Pickering was re-elected to a full six-year term in 1805.

However, during his term in the Senate, Adams crossed party lines to support certain aspects of President Thomas Jefferson's foreign policy during the Napoleonic Wars, including the Louisiana Purchase and Non-Importation Act, which were highly unpopular in Massachusetts. Adams was also the lone Federalist in Congress to vote for the Non-importation Act of 1806. Motivated by a sense of nationalism and his own national political ambitions, Adams was critical of High Federalists' narrow, sectional focus on New England issues; he opposed policies that he viewed as supportive of the British Empire and disunionist or even secessionist. He remained aligned with his party over perceived Jeffersonian attacks on judicial independence and continued to criticize Jefferson, particularly for his perceived support for Napoleon and weak policy towards both France and Spain.

In 1807, Adams broke fully with the Federalist over their response to the Chesapeake–Leopard affair, in which Britain attacked and captured an America warship, the USS Chesapeake, in American waters, hanging at least one man aboard. Although Adams privately maintained that the attack was the result of Jefferson's "procrastination," he strenuously questioned Federalist support for the attackers in the Senate. According to Adams, at least one Federalist responded by claiming that Adams's "head [would be] taken off for apostasy." In the subsequent special session called to address the attack, Adams voted in favor of the Embargo Act and pushed for war with Great Britain.

The Embargo Act was highly unpopular in Massachusetts and New England, which relied on international trade for its economic survival, and he was the only Federalist to vote for it. Although he attempted to repeal the Act in January 1808 and arm American merchant vessels, the proposal went nowhere and was mocked by his Federalist rival Pickering. He finally broke with his party over Pickering's proposal that nullification or secession would be an appropriate response to the crisis, publicly referring to this as "the servitude of British protection ... [that] brings us back to the Stamp Act and Tea Tax." Adams also drew opposition for his aggressive management of the expulsion of John Smith for alleged involvement in the Burr conspiracy and his decision to attend the Republican presidential nominating caucus in January 1808.

In response to Adams's continued distance from Federalist orthodoxy and alignment with the Jeffersonians, the Federalist legislature in Massachusetts held this early election for the United States Senate term beginning in March 1809.

== Candidates ==
- John Quincy Adams, incumbent U.S. senator since 1803 and son of John Adams
- James Lloyd, state senator from Boston
- Laban Wheaton, chief justice of the Bristol County court of common pleas

== Election ==
June 1808 Senate election
Party	Candidate	Votes	%
Federalist	James Lloyd	248	53.68%
Federalist	John Quincy Adams (incumbent)	213	46.10%
Federalist	Laban Wheaton	1	0.22%
Total votes		462	100.00%

== Aftermath ==
Adams resigned immediately following his defeat, issuing a rejoinder to the legislature which reaffirmed the administration's policy, "the object of which was to preserve from seizure and deprivation the persons and property of our citizens, and to vindicate the rights essential to the Independence of our Country, against the unjust aggressions and pretensions of all foreign powers." The resignation triggered a special election for the remainder of his term, which Lloyd won as well on June 9.

Adams soon formally joined the Democratic-Republicans and was appointed Minister to Russia by James Madison. Adams was later secretary of state in the cabinet of James Monroe and was elected as president of the United States in 1824.

In 1956, Massachusetts senator John F. Kennedy (and ghostwriter Ted Sorensen) reviewed Adams's support for the Louisiana Purchase and Embargo Act, and resulting defeat, in the opening chapter of Profiles in Courage.

== See also ==
- Embargo Act of 1807
