= Nonconsumption agreements =

The Non-consumption agreements were a part of a family of agreements, including the non-importation and non-exportation agreements addressed by American colonists in the 1774 Declarations and Resolves of the First Continental Congress. These agreements later served as the basis for the Non-Importation Act, and subsequent Embargo of 1807 that was passed by the United States Congress in 1806 in an attempt to establish American nautical neutrality during the Napoleonic Wars between France and Britain.

Throughout the 1760s, the American colonies found themselves in the midst of one of America's early economic falls. Colonists living in this time found themselves low on money, with trade becoming increasingly difficult, and their debt to Britain growing larger. To add to the colonist's already pressing issues, Britain began to impose a host of acts against them.

== Paying debts ==
In an attempt to gain some type of compensation for the colonist's debts, Britain created acts in an effort to offset expenses on their end due to activities mainly involving the protection of the colonists. Two of these were the Quartering Act and the Stamp Act. While the Quartering Act cut down on the cost of housing British soldiers, the Stamp act placed duties on any official papers or documents produced within the colonies in an attempt to create revenue with which to defray some of the colonist's debts.

== Taxes damage trade ==
The Sugar Act in particular had a negative impact on imports regarding trade between the colonies and outside countries. It cut costs on importing molasses into the country by half. However, the American colonists had been evading the previous tax, and although the Sugar Act reduced duties on molasses, it came with a higher enforcement level. It also placed taxes on imports that were formerly not taxed and put Britain's hand in important American exports such as lumber.

== Colonist resistance ==
The taxation and legislation passed by the British upset the colonists. American patriotism became strong and the colonists decided to confront the situation. In an attempt to resist the Stamp Act, the Sons of Liberty and Daughters of Liberty were born. Large portions of the protests were marked by riots, the burning of “stamped” papers and the tarring and feathering of British officials as well as those continuing to use British goods. American and homemade goods became the patriotic choice for consumers.

Another notable act that led to violent opposition was the passing of the Tea Act. This act enraged the already volatile colonists and resulted in a group of people living in Boston enacting the infamous Boston Tea Party, where in three ships worth of tea barrels were dumped into the Boston Harbor.

== Britain's reaction ==
In reaction to the colonists' actions regarding the Boston Tea Party, Britain decided to pass what were known as the Intolerable Acts. These acts were aimed at bringing the colonies back into compliance with the King's wishes and included the outlawing of town meetings.

Once again, the colonists were outraged. In response, twelve of the thirteen colonies formed the First Continental Congress, where they drafted a list of grievances against the crown and the provisions they would make until legislature was changed. One of these provisions were the non-consumption agreements, which stated that unless Britain repealed their previously passed acts, then the colonies would engage in neither the import of British goods nor export goods to Britain and its colonies.

== Split in the colonies ==
The colonists were not wholly supportive of refusing to consume British goods. This was especially the case with many merchants whose stores were stocked full of British goods and feared the shock that their income would surely incur. The Southern Colonies were also a large group that was wary of the effect that refusing trade with Britain would bring, as they were more heavily involved in producing the goods, such as cotton, that England consumed more heavily than were the Thirteen Colonies.
