= Jeffersonian democracy =

American political persuasion of the 1790s until the 1820s

Jeffersonian Era
- 1801–1825
Federalist Era	Era of Good Feelings - Antebellum South
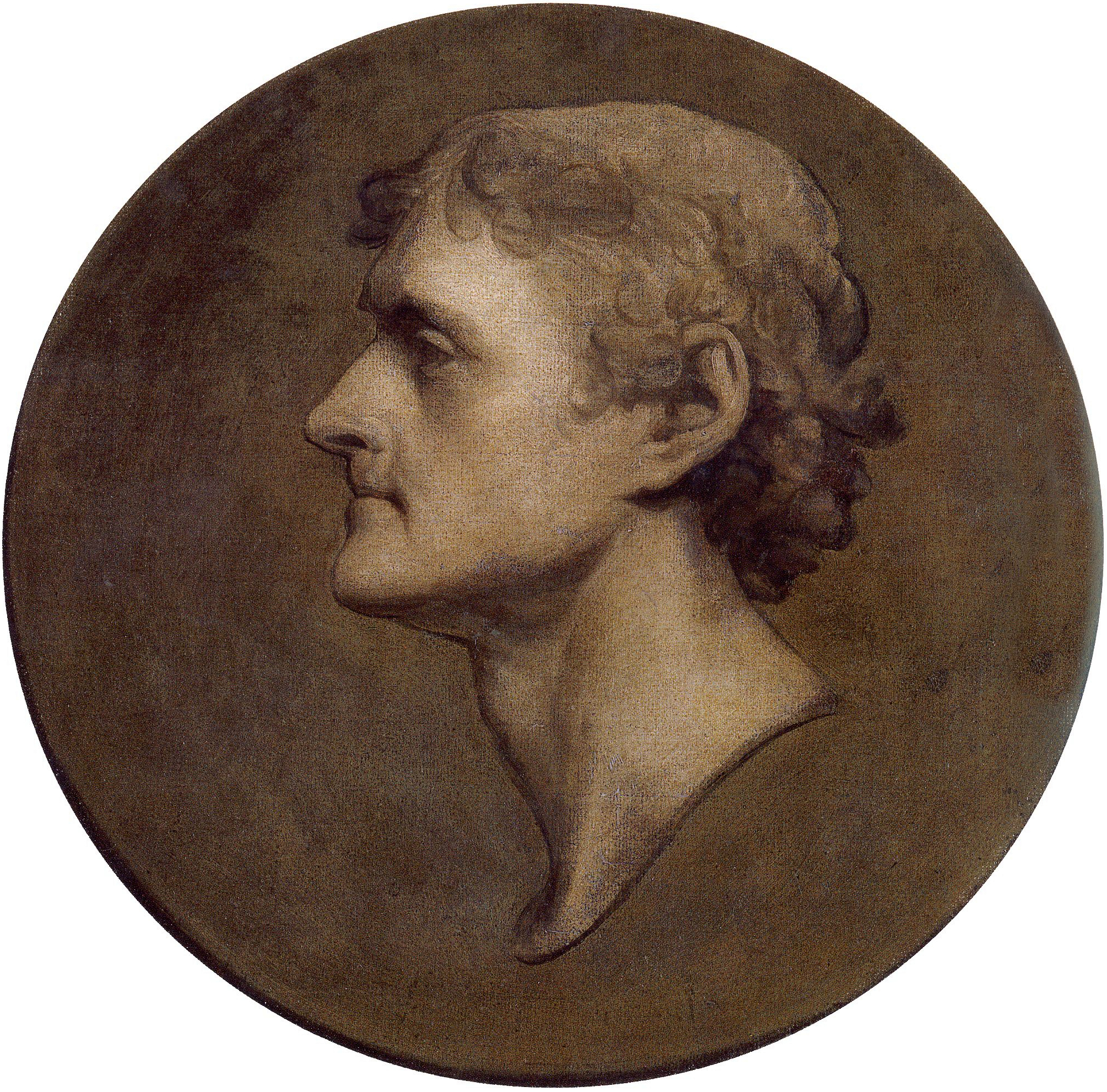
- The 1805 Jefferson medallion portrait by Gilbert Stuart
- Location: United States
- President(s): Thomas Jefferson; James Madison; James Monroe
- Key events: Louisiana Purchase; Lewis and Clark Expedition; Marbury v. Madison; War of 1812

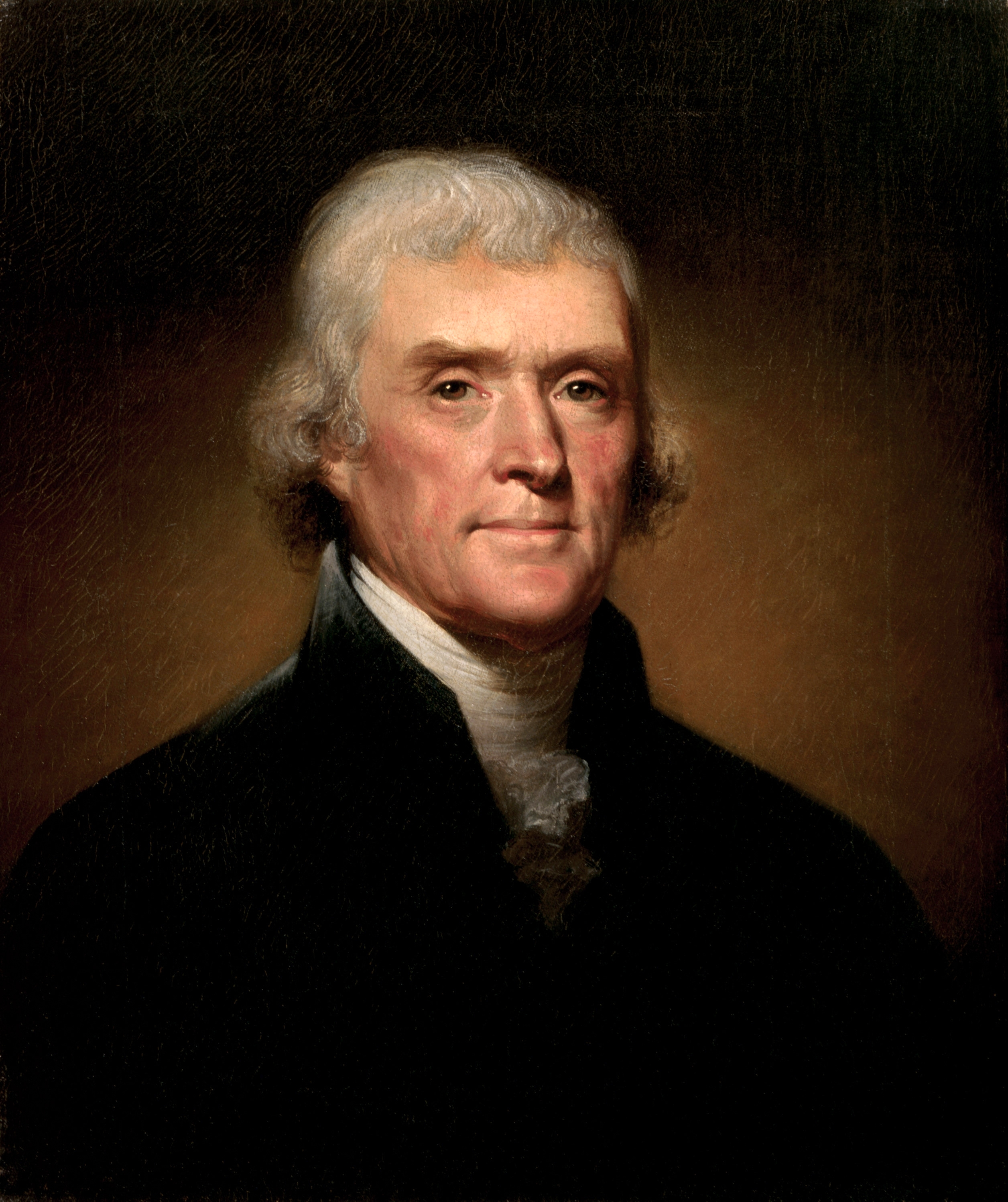
Portrait of Thomas Jefferson by Rembrandt Peale in 1800

Jeffersonian democracy or Jeffersonianism, named after its advocate Thomas Jefferson, was one of two dominant political outlooks and movements in the United States from the 1790s to the 1820s. The Jeffersonians were deeply committed to American republicanism, which meant opposition to what they considered to be elitism, opposition to corruption, and insistence on virtue, with a priority for the "yeoman farmer", "planters", and the "plain folk". They were antagonistic to the elitism of merchants, bankers, and manufacturers, distrusted factory work, and strongly opposed and were on the watch for supporters of the British Westminster system. They believed farmers made the best citizens and they welcomed opening up new low-cost farmland, especially the Louisiana Purchase of 1803.

The term was commonly used to refer to the Democratic-Republican Party, formally named the "Republican Party", which Jefferson founded in opposition to the Federalist Party of Alexander Hamilton. At the beginning of the Jeffersonian era, only two states, Vermont and Kentucky, established universal white male suffrage by abolishing property requirements. But by the end of the Jeffersonian period, more than half of the states had followed suit, including virtually all of the states in the Old Northwest. States then moved on to allowing white male popular votes for presidential elections, canvassing voters more modernly. Jefferson's party was then in full control of the apparatus of government – from the state legislature and city hall to the White House.

Jeffersonian democracy, which emphasized individual liberty, agrarian interests, and a limited federal government, continued to play a significant role within the Democratic Party up until the early 20th century. This influence can be seen in the rise of Jacksonian democracy, which expanded upon Jefferson's principles by advocating for the rights of the "common man" and promoting increased political participation among white men. Additionally, the impact of these democratic ideals is reflected in the three presidential campaigns of William Jennings Bryan, who passionately supported issues such as free silver and populist reforms.

== Positions ==
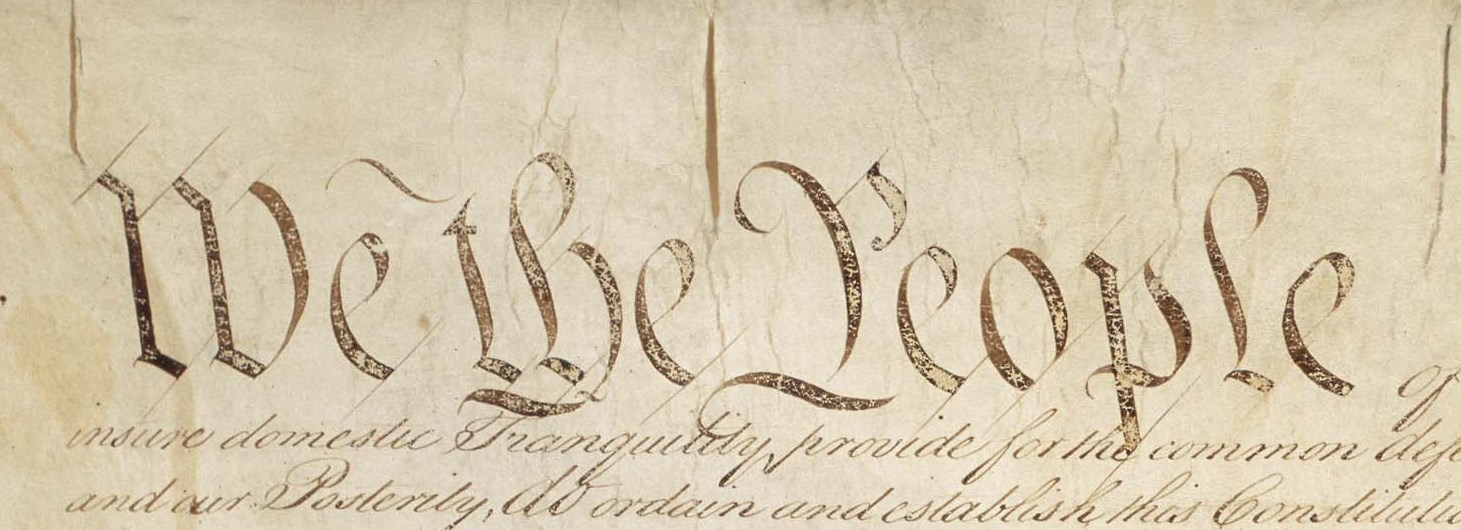
"We the People" in an original edition of the U.S. Constitution

Thomas Jefferson has been called "the most democratic of the founders". The Jeffersonians advocated a narrow interpretation of the Constitution's Article I provisions granting powers to the federal government. They strenuously opposed the Federalist Party, led by Treasury Secretary Alexander Hamilton. President George Washington generally supported Hamilton's program for a financially strong national government. The election of Jefferson in 1800, which Jefferson labeled "the revolution of 1800", brought in the Presidency of Thomas Jefferson and the permanent eclipse of the Federalists, apart from the Supreme Court.

Jeffersonian democracy is an umbrella term; some factions favored some positions more. While principled, with vehemently held core beliefs, the Jeffersonians had factions that disputed the true meaning of their creed. For example, during the Anglo-American War of 1812, it became apparent that independent state militia units were inadequate for conducting a serious war against a major country. The new Secretary of War John C. Calhoun, a Jeffersonian, proposed to build up the Army. With the support of most Republicans in Congress, Calhoun got his way. However, the "Old Republican" faction, claiming to be true to the Jeffersonian Principles of '98, fought him and reduced the size of the Army after Spain sold Florida to the U.S.

Historians characterize Jeffersonian democracy as including the following core ideals:

- The core political value of America is republicanism – citizens have a civic duty to aid the state and resist corruption, especially monarchism and aristocracy.
- Jeffersonian values are best expressed through an organized political party. The Jeffersonian party was officially the "Republican Party"; political scientists later called it the Democratic-Republican Party to differentiate it from the later Republican Party of Abraham Lincoln.
- It was the duty of citizens to vote, and the Jeffersonians invented many modern campaign techniques designed to get out the vote. Turnout indeed soared across the country. The work of John J. Beckley, Jefferson's agent in Pennsylvania, set new standards in the 1790s. In the 1796 presidential election, Beckley blanketed the state with agents who passed out 30,000 hand-written tickets, naming all 15 electors (printed tickets were not allowed). Historians consider Beckley to be one of the first American professional campaign managers, and his techniques were quickly adopted in other states.
- The Federalist Party, especially its leader Alexander Hamilton, was the archfoe because it accepted aristocracy and British methods.
- The national government is a dangerous necessity to be instituted for the common benefit, protection and security of the people, nation or community – it should be watched closely and circumscribed in its powers. Most anti-Federalists from 1787 to 1788 joined the Jeffersonians.
- Separation of church and state is the best method to keep the government free of religious disputes and religion free from corruption by the government.
- The federal government must not violate the rights of individuals. The Bill of Rights is a central theme.
- The federal government must not violate the rights of the states. The Kentucky and Virginia Resolutions of 1798 (written secretly by Jefferson and James Madison) proclaim these principles.
- Freedom of speech and the press are the best methods to prevent tyranny over the people by their own government. The Federalists' violation of this freedom through the Alien and Sedition Acts of 1798 became a major issue.
- The yeoman farmer best exemplifies civic virtue and independence from corrupting city influences – government policy should be for his benefit. Financiers, bankers, and industrialists make cities the "cesspools of corruption" and should be avoided. Agriculture was favored and capitalism was disfavored.
- The United States Constitution was written in order to ensure the freedom of the people. However, as Jefferson wrote to James Madison in 1789, "no society can make a perpetual constitution or even a perpetual law. The earth belongs always to the living generation".
- All men have the right to be informed and thus to have a say in the government. The protection and expansion of human liberty was one of the chief goals of the Jeffersonians. They also reformed their respective state systems of education. They believed that their citizens had a right to an education no matter their circumstances or status in life.
- The judiciary should be subservient to the elected branches, and the Supreme Court should not have the power to strike down laws passed by Congress. The Jeffersonians lost this battle to Chief Justice John Marshall, a Federalist, who dominated the Court from 1801 to his death in 1835.

=== Foreign policy ===
The Jeffersonians also had a distinct foreign policy:

- Americans had a duty to spread what Jefferson called the "Empire of Liberty" to the world, but should avoid "entangling alliances".
- Britain was the greatest threat, especially its monarchy, aristocracy, corruption, and business methods – the Jay Treaty of 1794 was much too favorable to Britain and thus threatened American values.
- Regarding the French Revolution, its devotion to principles of Republicanism, liberty, equality, and fraternity made France the ideal European nation. According to Michael Hardt, "Jefferson's support of the French Revolution often serves in his mind as a defense of republicanism against the monarchism of the Anglophiles". On the other hand, Napoleon was the antithesis of republicanism and could not be supported.
- Navigation rights on the Mississippi River were critical to American national interests. Control by Spain was tolerable – control by France was unacceptable. The Louisiana Purchase was an unexpected opportunity to guarantee those rights the Jeffersonians immediately seized.
- A standing army is dangerous to liberty and should be avoided – much better was to use economic coercion such as the embargo. See Embargo Act of 1807.
- Most Jeffersonians argued an expensive high seas navy was unnecessary since cheap locally based gunboats, floating batteries, mobile shore batteries, and coastal fortifications could defend the ports without the temptation to engage in distant wars. Jefferson himself, however, wanted a few frigates to protect American shipping against Barbary pirates in the Mediterranean.
- The locally controlled non-professional militia was adequate to defend the nation from invasion. After the militia proved inadequate in the War of 1812, President Madison expanded the national army for the duration.

=== Westward expansion ===
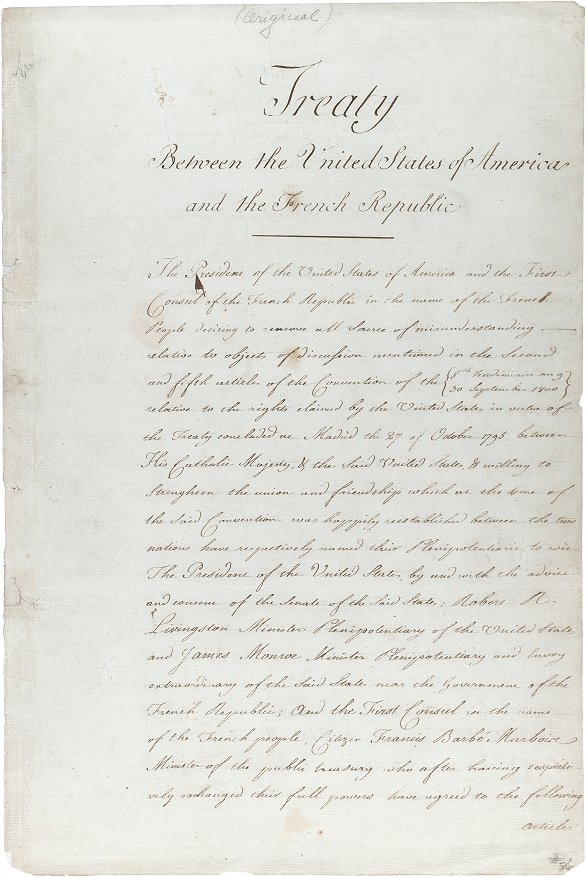
The original treaty of the Louisiana Purchase

Territorial expansion of the United States was a major goal of the Jeffersonians because it would produce new farm lands for yeomen farmers. Jefferson envisioned the United States as an "empire of liberty" whose republican institutions would spread across the continent through population growth and settlement. The Jeffersonians wanted to integrate the Indians into American society or remove further west those tribes that refused to integrate. However, Sheehan (1974) argues that the Jeffersonians, with the best of goodwill toward the Indians, destroyed their distinctive cultures with their misguided benevolence.

The Jeffersonians took enormous pride in the bargain they reached with France in the Louisiana Purchase of 1803. It opened up vast new fertile farmlands from Louisiana to Montana. Jefferson saw the West as an economic safety valve that would allow people in the crowded East to own farms. However, established New England political interests feared the growth of the West, and a majority in the Federalist Party opposed the purchase. Jeffersonians thought the new territory would help maintain their vision of the ideal republican society, based on agricultural commerce, governed lightly and promoting self-reliance and virtue.

Jeffersonians' dream did not come to pass as the Louisiana Purchase was a turning point in the history of American imperialism. The farmers that Jefferson identified with conquered the West, often through violence against Native Americans. Jefferson himself sympathized with Native Americans, but that did not stop him from enacting policies that would continue the trend towards the dispossession of their lands.

=== Economics ===
Jeffersonian agrarians held that the economy of the United States should rely more on agriculture for strategic commodities than on industry. Jefferson specifically believed: "Those who labor in the earth are the chosen people of God, if He ever had a chosen people, whose breast He has made His peculiar deposit for substantial and genuine virtue". However, Jeffersonian ideals are not opposed to all manufacturing, rather Jefferson believed that all people have the right to work to provide for their own subsistence and that an economic system which undermines that right is unacceptable.

Jefferson believed the expansion of industry and trade could lead to the development of a class of wage laborers reliant on others for income and sustenance. It would result in workers who were dependent voters. This belief made Jefferson apprehensive that Americans were at risk of economic exploitation and political coercion. Jefferson's solution was, as scholar Clay Jenkinson noted, "a graduated income tax that would serve as a disincentive to vast accumulations of wealth and would make funds available for some sort of benign redistribution downward", as well as tariffs on imported articles, which were mainly purchased by the wealthy. In 1811, Jefferson wrote a friend:

These revenues will be levied entirely on the rich . ... The Rich alone use imported articles, and on these alone, the whole taxes of the General Government are levied. The poor man ... pays not a farthing of tax to the General Government, but on his salt.

However, Jefferson was of the belief that a tax on income, as well as consumption, would constitute excessive taxation, writing in an 1816 letter:

... if the system be established on the basis of Income, and his just proportion on that scale has been already drawn from everyone, to step into the field of Consumption and tax special articles ... is doubly taxing the same article. For that portion of Income with which these articles are purchased, having already paid its tax as Income, to pay another tax on the thing it purchased, is paying twice for the same thing; it is an aggrievance on the citizens who use these articles in the exoneration of those who do not, contrary to the most sacred of the duties of a government, to do equal and impartial justice to all its citizens.

Lastly, Jefferson and other Jeffersonians believed in the power of embargoes as a means to inflict punishment on hostile foreign nations. Jefferson preferred these methods of coercion to war.

While Jeffersonianism is often considered to be classical liberal in themes of economics, some source argue against that claim and see the economics of Jeffersonianism more as social liberal.

=== Limited government ===
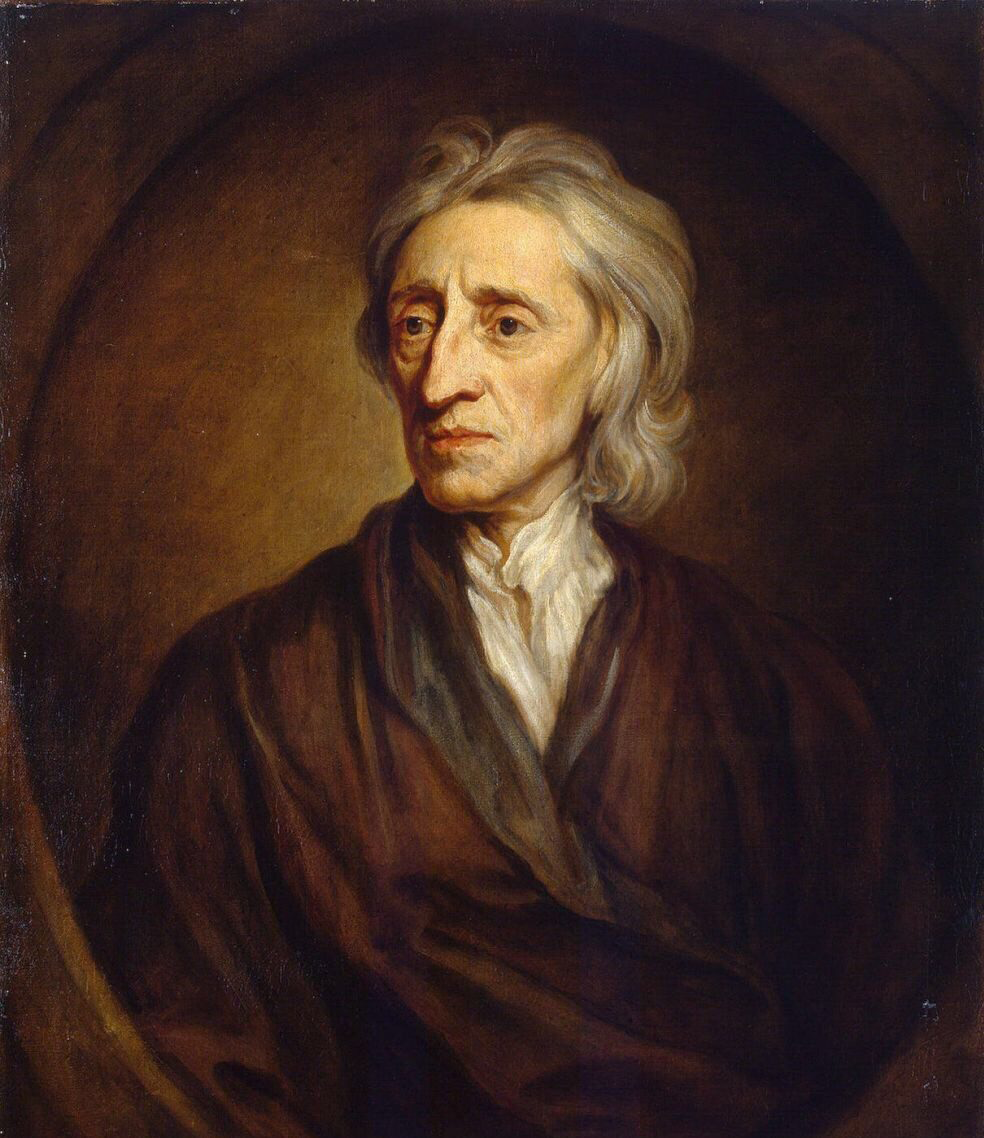
Jefferson's thoughts on limited government were influenced by the 17th century English political philosopher John Locke

While the Federalists advocated for a strong central government, Jeffersonians argued for strong state and local governments and a weak federal government. Self-sufficiency, self-government, and individual responsibility were in the Jeffersonian worldview among the most important ideals that formed the basis of the American Revolution. In Jefferson's opinion, the federal government should accomplish nothing that individuals at the local level could feasibly accomplish. The federal government would concentrate its efforts solely on national and international projects. Jefferson's advocacy of limited government led to sharp disagreements with Federalist figures such as Alexander Hamilton. Jefferson felt that Hamilton favored plutocracy and the creation of a powerful aristocracy in the United States which would accumulate increasingly greater power until the political and social order of the United States became indistinguishable from those of the Old World.

After initial skepticism, Jefferson supported the ratification of the United States Constitution and especially supported its stress on checks and balances. The ratification of the United States Bill of Rights, especially the First Amendment, gave Jefferson even greater confidence in the document. Jeffersonians favored a strict construction interpretation of federal government powers described in Article I of the Constitution. For example, Jefferson once wrote a letter to Charles Willson Peale explaining that although a Smithsonian-style national museum would be a fantastic resource, he could not support the use of federal funds to construct and maintain such a project. The "strict constructionism" of today is a remote descendant of Jefferson's views.

== Politics and factions ==
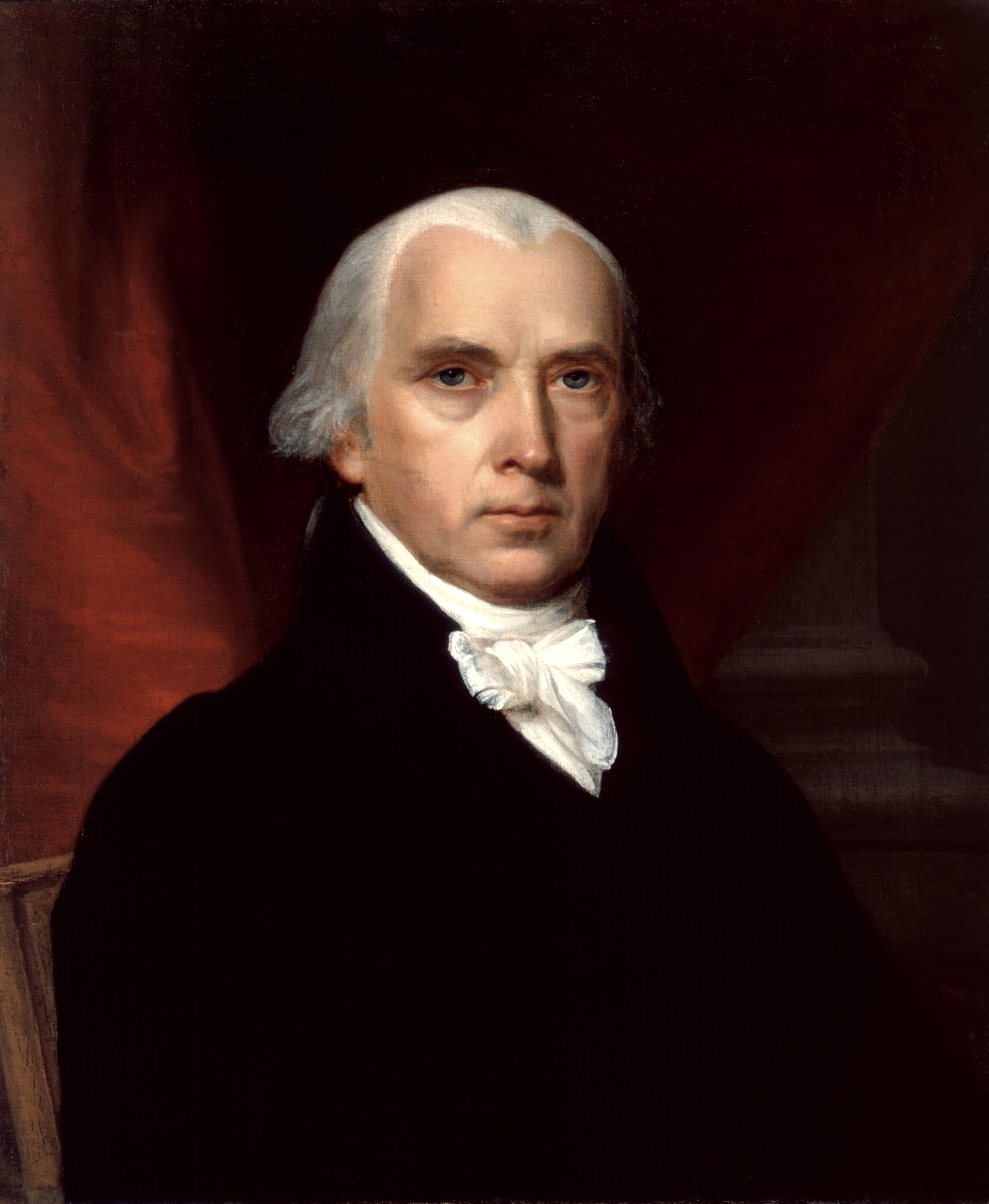
James Madison

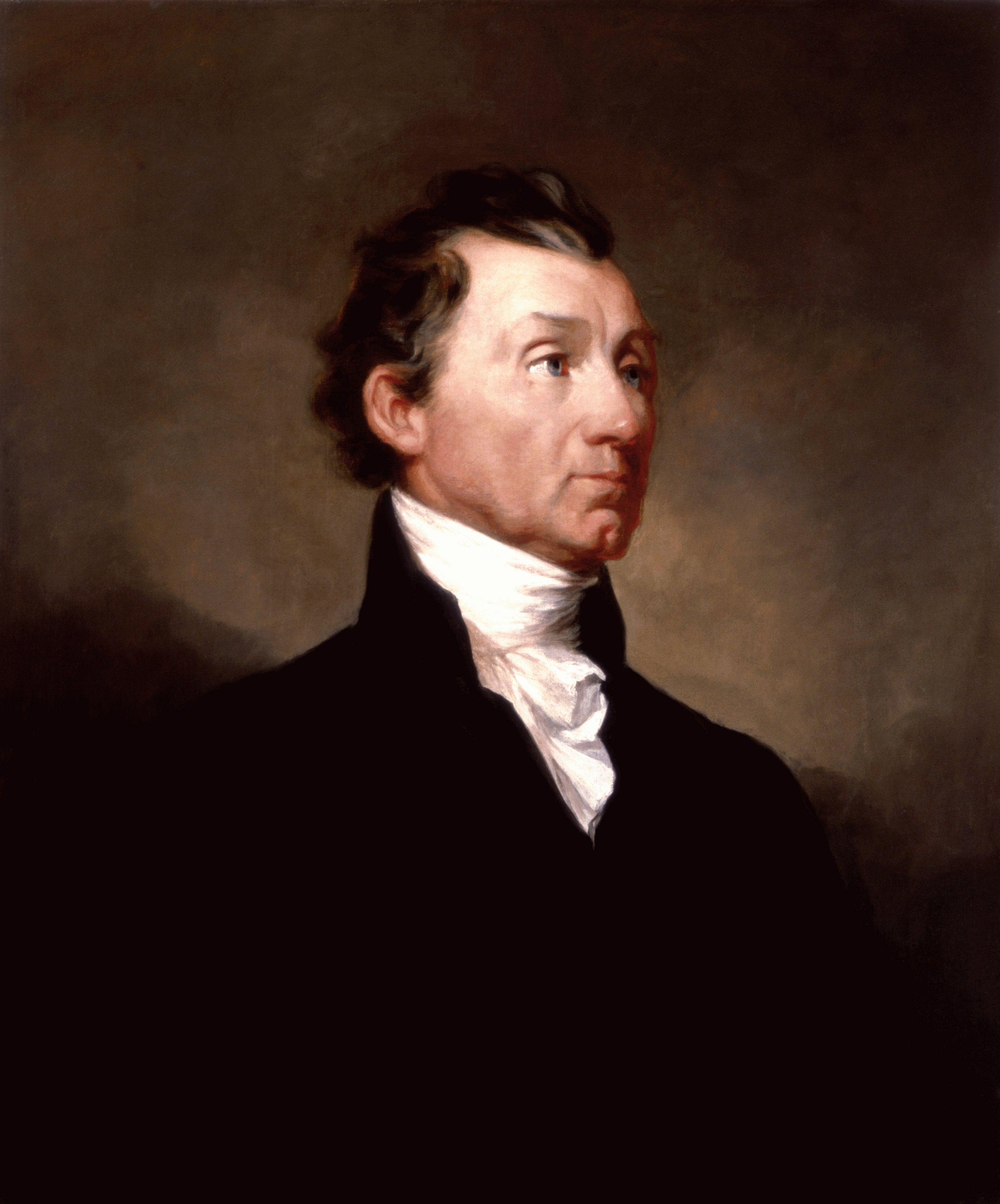
James Monroe

The spirit of Jeffersonian democracy dominated American politics from 1800 to 1824, the First Party System, under Jefferson and succeeding presidents James Madison and James Monroe. The Jeffersonians proved much more successful than the Federalists in building state and local party organizations that united various factions. Voters in every state formed blocs loyal to the Jeffersonian coalition.

Prominent spokesmen for Jeffersonian principles included Madison, Albert Gallatin, John Randolph of Roanoke, Nathaniel Macon, John Taylor of Caroline, and James Monroe, John C. Calhoun, John Quincy Adams, and Henry Clay; however, Calhoun, Adams, and Clay pursued new paths after 1828.

Randolph was the Jeffersonian leader in Congress from 1801 to 1815, but he later broke with Jefferson and formed his own "Tertium Quids" faction because he thought the president no longer adhered to the true Jeffersonian principles of 1798. The Quids wanted to actively punish and discharge Federalists in the government and in the courts. Jefferson himself sided with the moderate faction exemplified by figures such as Madison, who were much more conciliatory towards Federalism.

After the Madison administration experienced serious trouble financing the War of 1812 and discovered the Army and militia could not effectively make war, a new more combative generation of Republican nationalists arrived on the scene. They were supported by President James Monroe, an original Jeffersonian; and included John Quincy Adams, Henry Clay and John C. Calhoun. In 1824, Adams defeated Andrew Jackson, who had support from the Quids; and in a few years, two successor parties had emerged, the Democratic Party, which formulated Jacksonian democracy and which still exists; and Henry Clay's Whig Party. Their competition marked the Second Party System.

After 1830, the principles were still talked about but did not form the basis of a political party; thus, editor Horace Greeley in 1838 started a magazine, The Jeffersonian, that he said: "would exhibit a practical regard for that cardinal principle of Jeffersonian Democracy, and the People are the sole and safe depository of all power, principles and opinions which are to direct the Government".

President Franklin D. Roosevelt proclaimed that his New Deal was Jeffersonian, and he built the Jefferson Memorial in 1943 to enhance that claim. He argued in the 1932 campaign that, "Jefferson realized that the exercise of the property rights might so interfere with the rights of the individual that the Government, without whose assistance the property rights could not exist, must intervene, not to destroy individualism, but to protect it." On the other hand, small-government conservatives like Ronald Reagan hailed the Jeffersonian opposition to a powerful central government.

== Jefferson and Jeffersonian principles ==
Jeffersonian democracy was not a one-person operation. It was a significant political party with many local and state leaders and various factions, and they did not always agree with Jefferson or with each other.

Jefferson was accused of inconsistencies by his opponents. The "Old Republicans" said that Jefferson abandoned the Principles of 1798. Jefferson believed the national security concerns were so urgent that it was necessary to purchase Louisiana without waiting for a Constitutional amendment. Jefferson enlarged federal power through the intrusively enforced Embargo Act of 1807. Jefferson idealized the "yeoman farmer" despite being a gentleman plantation owner. Numerous historians have noted the disparities between Jefferson's philosophy and practices. Staloff proposed that it was due to his being a proto-Romantic; John Quincy Adams claimed that it was a manifestation of pure hypocrisy, or "pliability of principle"; and Bailyn asserts it simply represented a contradiction with Jefferson, that he was "simultaneously a radical utopian idealist and a hardheaded, adroit, at times cunning politician". However, Jenkinson argued that Jefferson's personal failings ought not to influence present-day thinkers to disregard Jeffersonian ideals.

Kuehnelt-Leddihn, a European nobleman who opposed democracy, argues that "Jeffersonian democracy" is a misnomer because Jefferson was not a democrat but believed in rule by an elite: "Jefferson actually was an Agrarian Romantic who dreamt of a republic governed by an elite of character and intellect".

Historian Sean Wilentz argues that as a practical politician elected to serve the people, Jefferson had to negotiate solutions, not insist on his own version of abstract positions. The result, Wilentz argues, was "flexible responses to unforeseen events ... in pursuit of ideals ranging from the enlargement of opportunities for the mass of ordinary, industrious Americans to the principled avoidance of war".

Historians have long portrayed the contest between Jefferson and Hamilton as iconic for the politics, political philosophy, economic policies, and future direction of the United States. In 2010, Wilentz identified a scholarly trend in Hamilton's favor:

In recent years, Hamilton and his reputation have decidedly gained the initiative among scholars who portray him as the visionary architect of the modern liberal capitalist economy and of a dynamic federal government headed by an energetic executive. Jefferson and his allies, by contrast, have come across as naïve, dreamy idealists. At best according to many historians, the Jeffersonians were reactionary utopians who resisted the onrush of capitalist modernity in hopes of turning America into a yeoman farmers' arcadia. At worst, they were proslavery racists who wish to rid the West of Indians, expand the empire of slavery, and keep political power in local hands – all the better to expand the institution of slavery and protect slaveholders' rights to own human property.

Joseph Ellis wrote that developments in urbanization and industrialization that occurred during the turn of the 20th century had largely rendered Jefferson's agrarian dream irrelevant.

Jefferson summarized his essential principles of government in his first inaugural address on March 4, 1801, when he expounded on "the essential principles of our Government, and consequently, those which ought to shape its Administration", stating:

Equal and exact justice to all men, of whatever state or persuasion, religious or political; peace, commerce, and honest friendship with all nations, entangling alliances with none; the support of the State governments in all their rights, as the most competent administrations for our domestic concerns and the surest bulwarks against anti-republican tendencies; the preservation of the General Government in its whole constitutional vigor, as the sheet anchor of our peace at home and safety abroad; a jealous care of the right of election by the people...; absolute acquiescence in the decisions of the majority...a well-disciplined militia, our best reliance in peace and for the first moments of war till regulars may relieve them; the supremacy of the civil over the military authority; economy in the public expense, that labor may be lightly burthened; the honest payment of our debts and sacred preservation of the public faith; encouragement of agriculture, and of commerce as its handmaid; the diffusion of information and arraignment of all abuses at the bar of the public reason; freedom of religion; freedom of the press, and freedom of person under the protection of the habeas corpus, and trial by juries impartially selected.

== See also ==
- Agrarianism
- American election campaigns in the 19th century
- Anti-Federalism
- Bibliography of Thomas Jefferson
- Classical liberalism
- Classical republicanism
- Decentralization
- Democratic-Republican Party
- Distributism
- Federal republicanism
- First Party System
- Jacksonian democracy
- Liberalism in the United States
- Libertarianism in the United States
- Modern liberalism in the United States
- Republicanism in the United States
- Slavery in the United States
