= Macon's Bill Number 1 =

Macon's Bill Number 1 was introduced in the United States House of Representatives on December 19, 1809, by Nathaniel Macon from the U.S. House Committee on Foreign Relations. The bill was drawn up by Albert Gallatin and prohibited public vessels of France or England or private vessels owned by subjects of either power from entering American ports; forbade the importation of goods from either country or its colonies; and provided that whenever either country should revoke or modify her edicts so that they would cease to violate the neutral commerce of the United States, the President of the United States should issue a proclamation announcing the cessation of the prohibitions of the act toward the revoking power.

He afterwards moved an amendment to make the act expire with the present session of the United States Congress, when by its terms it would not go into effect till April 15, his object being to make it useless. It finally passed by the unsatisfactory vote of 73 to 52. The United States Senate amended it by striking out all but the sections prohibiting British and French public vessels from entering American ports and limiting the act to the next session of Congress. The House of Representatives refused to recede and the bill was lost.

On April 8, 1810, Congress brought in another bill, commonly known as Macon's Bill Number 2 even though Nathaniel Macon had nothing to do with this bill and did not support it, providing that if France or Great Britain should revoke her edicts before March 3 of the next year, the President should proclaim the fact, and if within three months thereafter the other nation did not repeal its edicts, the non-intercourse regulations should be effective against it. This bill, after undergoing various amendments, passed the House of Representatives on April 19, 1810, by a vote of 61 to 40. It was sent back to the Senate with further amendments and finally passed on the last day of the session, May 1, 1810, being approved on the same day.
