= Non-Intercourse Act (1809) =

1809 U.S. law lifting trade embargoes on all countries except Britain and France

- Long title: An Act to interdict the commercial trade between the United States and Great Britain and France, and their dependencies; and for other purposes.
- Nicknames: the replacement for the embargo act
- Enacted by: the 10th United States Congress
- Effective: March 7, 1809

Citations
- Public law: Pub. L. 10–24
- Statutes at Large: 2 Stat. 528

Codification
- Acts repealed: Non-importation Act

Legislative history
- Introduced in the Senate as S. 48; Passed the Senate on February 21, 1809 (21-12); Passed the House on February 27, 1809 (81-40); Signed into law by President Thomas Jefferson on March 1, 1809

United States Supreme Court cases
- Cargo of the Brig Aurora v. United States, 11 U.S. 382 (1813)

The Non-Intercourse Act of March 1809 lifted all embargoes on American shipping except for those bound for British or French ports.

Enacted in the last sixteen days of President Thomas Jefferson's presidency by the 10th Congress to replace the Embargo Act of 1807, the almost unenforceable law's intent was to damage the economies of the United Kingdom and France. Like its predecessor, the Embargo Act, it was mostly ineffective, and contributed to the coming of the War of 1812. In addition, it seriously damaged the economy of the United States. The Non-Intercourse Act was followed by Macon's Bill Number 2. Despite hurting the economy as a whole, the bill's prohibition on British manufactured goods stimulated domestic production and helped America begin to industrialize.
