= Cargo of the Brig Aurora v. United States =

- Supreme Court of the United States

Argued February 23, 1813 Decided February 26, 1813
- Full case name: Cargo of the Brig Aurora v. United States
- Citations: 11 U.S. 382 (more) 7 Cranch 382; 3 L. Ed. 378

Holding
- Congress may revive a law by conditioning its revival on certain inaction by the President. Such is not an unconstitutional delegation of legislative authority.

Court membership
- Chief Justice John Marshall Associate Justices Bushrod Washington · William Johnson; H. Brockholst Livingston · Thomas Todd; Gabriel Duvall · Joseph Story

Case opinion
- Majority: Johnson, joined by unanimous

Laws applied
- U.S. Const. art. I, § 8, cl. 3 and Non-Intercourse Act

Cargo of the Brig Aurora v. United States, 11 U.S. (7 Cranch) 382 (1813), involved a forfeiture statute that Congress passed with a condition. The 1809 Non-Intercourse Act, a trade prohibition against Great Britain, would be reinstated the following year unless the President declared that it was no longer violating the neutrality of the United States. The Court unanimously rejected arguments based on the nondelegation doctrine, "reviving the act [...] neither expressly or conditionally, as their judgment should direct."
