= Macon's Bill Number 2 =

1810 U.S. legislation

- Long title: An Act concerning the commercial intercourse between the United States and Great Britain and France, and their dependencies, and for other purposes.

Citations
- Statutes at Large: 2 Stat. 605

Legislative history
- Signed into law by President James Madison on May 1, 1810

Macon's Bill Number 2, which became law in the United States on May 14, 1810, was intended to force Britain and France to cease intercepting American merchant ships during the Napoleonic Wars. This was a revision of the original bill by Representative Nathaniel Macon, known as Macon's Bill Number 1. Macon's Bill Number 2 was the fourth in a series of embargo measures, coming after the Non-Importation Act, the Embargo Act, and the Non-Intercourse Act (1809). Macon neither wrote the bill nor approved it.

The law lifted all embargoes with Britain and France for three months. It stated that if either belligerent ceased intercepting American shipping, the United States would embargo the other, unless that other country also agreed to cease intercepting American shipping.

Napoleon successfully exploited the bill to further his Continental System, effectively a French embargo on Britain that France tried to enforce on continental Europe, and to damage Anglo-American relations. A message was sent to the United States, purporting to agree to the law's demand. President James Madison, a staunch opponent of the bill, had little choice but to accept Napoleon's ostensibly sincere offer. However, as Madison suspected, Napoleon's purpose was manipulative. When Britain threatened to impose punitive measures on the United States in response, Napoleon reneged anyway, having achieved his goal of pushing the United States and Britain closer to the eventual War of 1812.
