= Non-Importation Act =

1806 US law forbidding the import of certain British goods

- Long title: An Act to prohibit the importation of certain goods, wares and merchandise.
- Nicknames: Non-importation Act of 1806
- Enacted by: the 9th United States Congress
- Effective: April 18, 1806

Citations
- Public law: Pub. L. 9–29
- Statutes at Large: 2 Stat. 379, Chap. 29

Legislative history
- Introduced in the House as H.R. 117; Passed the House on March 25, 1806 (93-32); Passed the Senate on April 15, 1806 (19-9); Signed into law by President Thomas Jefferson on April 18, 1806

The Non-Importation Act, passed by the United States Congress on April 18, 1806, forbid any kind of import of certain British goods in an attempt to coerce Britain to suspend its interference with American merchant shipping. The Act was the first in a series of ineffective attempts of Congress and the administrations of President Thomas Jefferson and James Madison to respond economically instead of militarily to disputes with Britain and to other consequences of the Napoleonic Wars. The Act was part of the chain of events leading to the War of 1812.

== Background ==
During the Napoleonic Wars, British and, to a lesser extent, French interference with American merchant shipping prompted Congress to take action. Given the United States' relative weakness compared to these powers, Congress explored economic measures as an alternative to military engagement. While some advocated for a full embargo, others supported more measured actions. After three months of debate, the limited measures gained initial support. The resulting act, effective November 15, 1806, aimed to pressure Britain through economic means and compel it to respect American shipping rights. However, the act's enforcement had unintended consequences for the U.S. economy.

== Banned items ==
The following items were banned under the Non-Importation Act of 1806:

- All articles of which leather, silk, hemp, flax, tin (except in sheets), or brass was the material of chief value
- All woolen clothes whose invoice prices shall exceed 5/- sterling per square yard
- Woolen hosiery of all kinds
- Window, glass and glassware
- Silver and plated goods
- Paper
- Nails
- Spikes
- Hats
- Ready-made clothing
- Playing cards
- Beer, ale and porter
- Pictures and prints

The penalties for infraction were a loss of the goods and a fine of three times their value.

== Weakness ==
Dissident Congressman John Randolph described the law as "a milk-and-water bill, a dose of chicken-broth to be taken nine months hence". The list of banned British goods excluded those most important to trade. These items included cheap woolens, coal, iron, steel, and British colonial produce, all goods deemed too vital to embargo.

== Enforcement ==
Britain did not change its policies or actions. Public protest soon forced the Act's suspension. President Jefferson was given the power to suspend it longer, and again did in March 1807.

== Gallatin's contributions ==
Congress asked Treasury Secretary Albert Gallatin for advice. Gallatin complained that the bill was badly worded and lacked specificity. For instance, many accepted imported items come wrapped in paper, which was forbidden. Some banned materials, like silver, were used to create permitted goods, like watches. Gallatin felt the Act would raise more questions than it answered, and suggested an embargo could be administered more effectively.

Congress eventually responded to Gallatin's advice by passing a more prohibitive Act, the Embargo Act of 1807, as customs inspectors were noticing that other countries' ships were evading the law by delivering banned goods.

== Replacement Acts ==
The Embargo Act of 1807 would prove to damage the American economy severely. It in turn was superseded by the Non-Intercourse Act of 1809 and subsequently Macon's Bill Number 2. All were clearly ineffective. Eventually the War of 1812 interrupted economic growth, mooting American economic warfare attempts.

== See also ==
- Non-Intercourse Act (1809)
- Macon's Bill Number 2
- Origins of the War of 1812
- Nonconsumption agreements
