= Embargo Act of 1807 =

1807 U.S. law forbidding trade with all other countries

- Long title: An Act laying an Embargo on all ships and vessels in the ports and harbors of the United States.
- Enacted by: the 10th United States Congress
- Effective: December 22, 1807

Citations
- Public law: Pub. L. 10–5
- Statutes at Large: 2 Stat. 451, Chap. 5

Legislative history
- Introduced in the Senate by Samuel Smith (DR-MD) on December 18, 1807; Passed the Senate on December 18, 1807 (22–6); Passed the House on December 21, 1807 (82–44) with amendment; Senate agreed to House amendment on December 22, 1807 (unknown votes); Signed into law by President Thomas Jefferson on December 22, 1807

Major amendments
- Repealed by Non-Intercourse Act § 19

The Embargo Act of 1807 was a general trade embargo on all foreign nations that was enacted by the United States Congress. Much broader than the ineffectual 1806 Non-importation Act, it represented an escalation of attempts to coerce Britain and France to cease their interference with American merchant shipping as the Napoleonic Wars continued. In the first decade of the 19th century, American shipping grew. During the Napoleonic Wars, British and French authorities seized American merchantmen trading with the other side. American merchantmen bound for trade with "enemy nations" were seized as contraband of war by both European powers. The Royal Navy, angered by thousands of its sailors deserting and finding work on American merchantmen, began stopping US ships and reclaiming alleged deserters. This inflamed American public opinion, which was exacerbated by incidents such as the Chesapeake–Leopard affair.

Congress imposed the embargo in direct response to these events. President Thomas Jefferson weighed public support for retaliation, but recognized that the United States was militarily far weaker than either Britain or France. He recommended Congress respond instead with commercial warfare. The experiment appealed to Jefferson and would harm his Northeastern opponents more than his domestic allies, irrespective of any actual impact on the European belligerents. The 10th Congress, controlled by his allies, agreed to the Act, which was signed into law on December 22, 1807. The Embargo failed to improve the American diplomatic position, and sharply increased international tensions. Both widespread evasion of the embargo and loopholes in the legislation reduced the intended economic impact. British commercial shipping, which already dominated global trade, was successfully adapting to Napoleon's Continental System by pursuing new markets—particularly in the restive Spanish and Portuguese colonies in South America.

The Act's prohibition on imports protected nascent US domestic industries across the board, particularly the textile industry, marking the beginning of a United States manufacturing system, and reducing the nation's dependence upon imported manufactured goods. Americans opposed to the Act launched bitter protests, particularly in New England commercial centers. Support for the declining Federalist Party, which intensely opposed Jefferson, temporarily rebounded and drove electoral gains in 1808 (Senate and House). In the waning days of Jefferson's presidency, the Non-Intercourse Act lifted all embargoes on American shipping except cargoes bound for Britain or France. Enacted March 1, 1809, that law exacerbated American tensions with Britain, eventually leading to the War of 1812.

== Background ==
After a short truce between the French Revolutionary Wars and the Napoleonic Wars during 1802–1803, the European conflicts resumed and continued until the defeat of Napoleon Bonaparte in 1814. The wars caused American relations with both Britain and France to deteriorate rapidly. There was a high risk of an American war with one nation or the other. With Britain supreme on the sea and France on the land, the war developed into a struggle of blockade and counterblockade. The commercial war peaked in 1806 and 1807. The British government issued the Orders in Council which further restricted American trade with France and its allies. France's government declared a paper blockade of Britain, but lacked a navy that could enforce it, and seized American ships that obeyed British regulations. The Royal Navy needed large numbers of sailors, and was deeply angered by the American merchant fleet being a haven for British deserters.

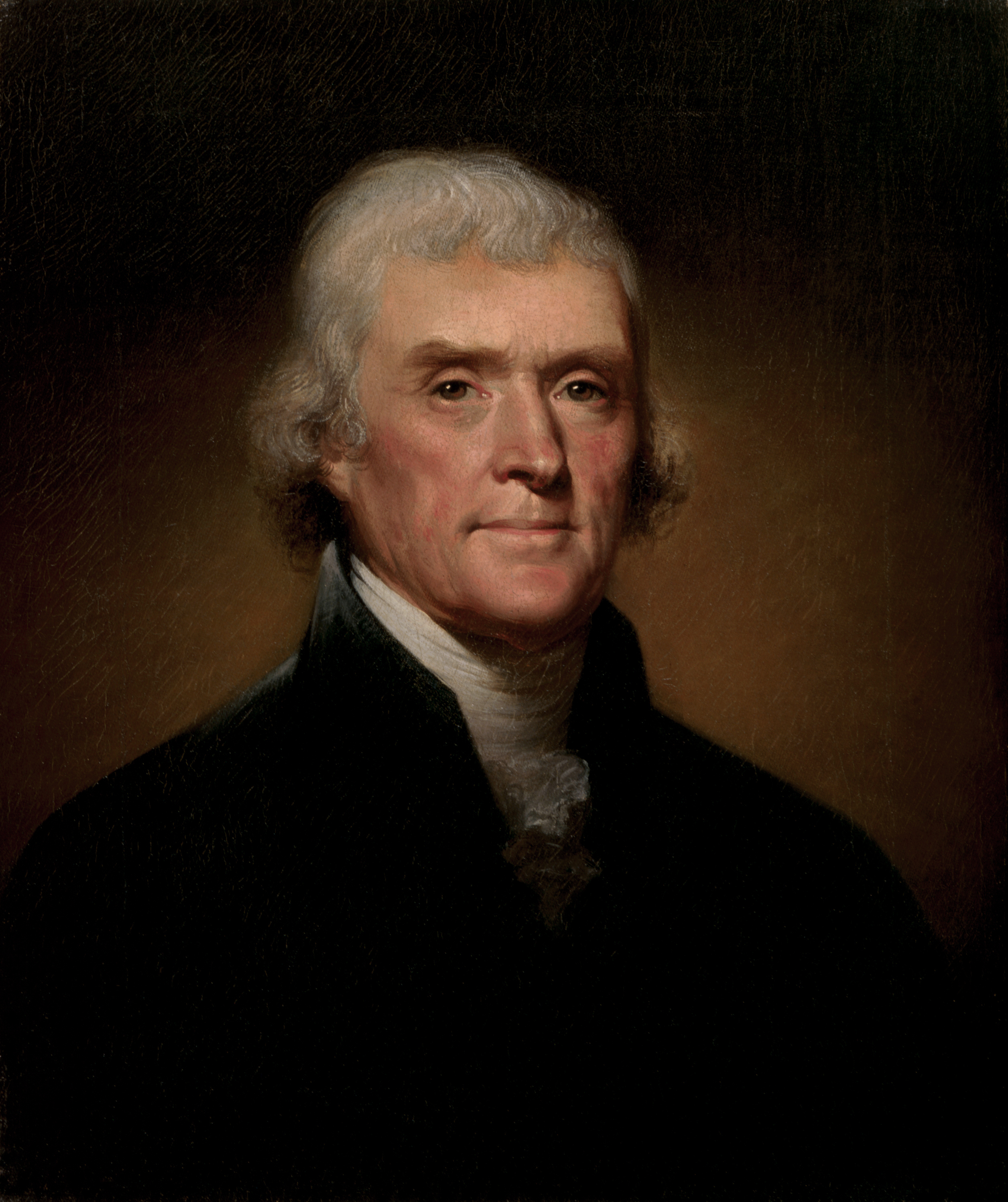
Thomas Jefferson, United States of America President from 1801 to 1809 and signer of the Embargo Act

The Royal Navy began impressing alleged deserters from American merchantmen. This was seen by the American public as a humiliation and led to an uptick in anti-British sentiment in the US. The number of sailors impressed from American ships increased sharply after 1803 in response to the outbreak of the Napoleonic Wars. On June 21, 1807, the USS Chesapeake was boarded on the high seas off the coast of Norfolk, Virginia by HMS Leopard. Chesapeake had been carrying four deserters from the Royal Navy, three of them American and one British. The four deserters, who had been issued American papers, were removed from Chesapeake and taken to Halifax, Nova Scotia, where the lone Briton was hanged. The three Americans were initially sentenced to 500 lashes, though American diplomatic pressure led Britain to return them with no punishment. An outraged American public demanded action, and President Jefferson ordered all British warships out of U.S. waters.

== Initial legislation ==
Passed on December 22, 1807, the Act did the following:

- An embargo was laid on all ships and vessels under US jurisdiction.
- All ships and vessels were prevented from obtaining clearance to undertake in voyages to foreign ports or places.
- The US president was allowed to make exceptions for ships under his immediate direction.
- The President was authorized to enforce via instructions to revenue officers and the Navy.
- It was not constructed to prevent the departure of any foreign ship or vessel, with or without cargo on board,
- A bond or surety was required from merchant ships on a voyage between US ports.
- Warships were exempted from the embargo provisions.

The shipping embargo was a cumulative addition to the Non-importation Act of 1806 (2 Stat. 379), which was a "Prohibition of the Importation of certain Goods and Merchandise from the Kingdom of Great Britain", the prohibited imported goods being defined where their chief value, which consists of leather, silk, hemp or flax, tin or brass, wool, glass, and paper goods, nails, hats, clothing, and beer.

The Embargo Act of 1807 was codified at 2 Stat. 451 and formally titled "An Embargo laid on Ships and Vessels in the Ports and Harbours of the United States". The bill was drafted at the request of President Thomas Jefferson and was passed by the 10th Congress on December 22, 1807, during Session 1; Chapter 5. Congress initially acted to enforce a bill prohibiting only imports, but supplements to the bill eventually banned exports as well.

== Impact on US trade ==
Engraved teapot encouraging support for the Embargo: Encircling the lid is "Jefferson and the Embargo". On one side is "Mind your business" and on the other is "Prudence is the best Remedy for hard times".

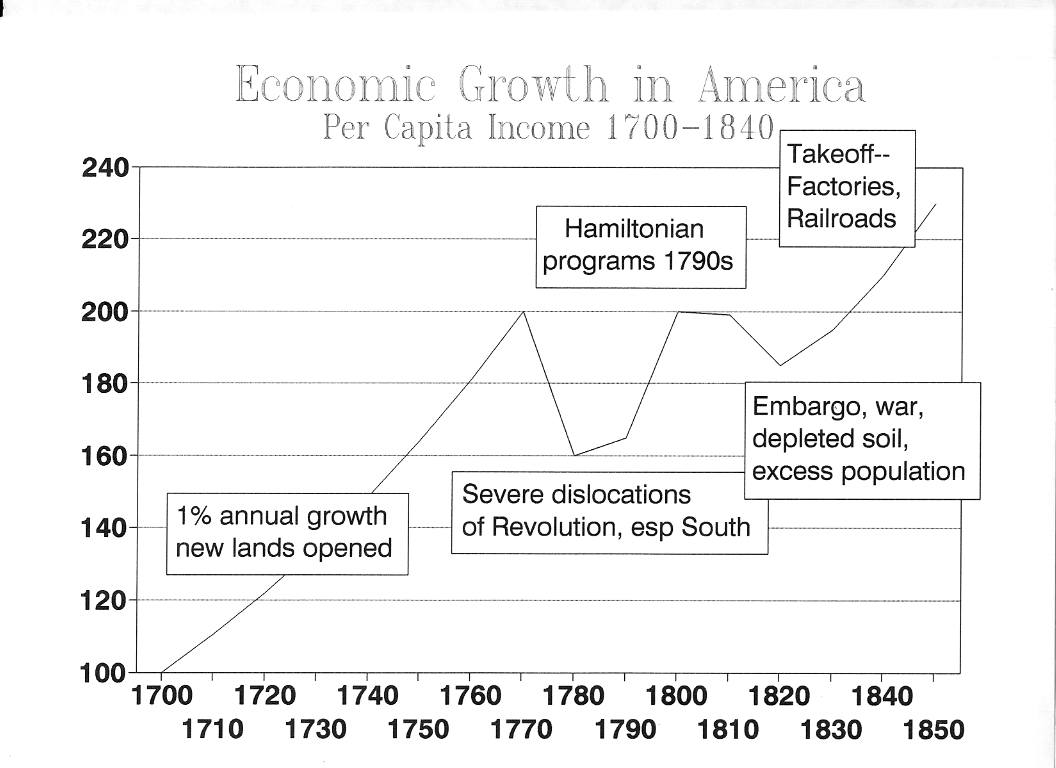
The economical impact of the embargo can be seen from this graph showing growth of the U.S. economy.

The embargo had the dual effect of severely curtailing American overseas trade, while forcing industrial concerns to invest new capital into domestic manufacturing in the United States. In commercial New England and the Middle Atlantic, ships sat idle. In agricultural areas, particularly the South, farmers and planters could not sell crops internationally. The scarcity of European goods stimulated American manufacturing, particularly in the North, and textile manufacturers began to make massive investments in cotton mills. However, as Britain was still able to export to America particularly through Canada, that benefit did not immediately compensate for present loss of trade and economic momentum. A 2005 study by the economic historian Douglas Irwin estimates that the embargo cost about 5% of America's 1807 gross national product.

Miniature teapots were manufactured, engraved with slogans intended to bolster flagging popular support for the Embargo Act.

== Case studies ==
A case study of Rhode Island shows the embargo to have devastated shipping-related industries, wrecked existing markets, and broadened opposition to the Democratic–Republican Party. Much of the U.S. approved of smuggling, holding that the embargo violated their rights. Public outcry helped the Federalists regain control of Rhode Island state government in 1808–1809. The case is a rare example of American national foreign policy altering local patterns of political allegiance.

Despite its unpopularity, the Embargo Act yielded limited and unintended benefits to the Northeast, driving capital and labor into New England textile and other manufacturing industries. It reduced U.S. reliance on British manufactured goods, but the growth in domestic industries didn't make up for the damage caused by the embargo.

In Vermont, the embargo was doomed to failure on the Lake Champlain–Richeleiu River water route because of the state's dependence on a Canadian outlet for produce. At St. John, Lower Canada, £140,000 worth of goods smuggled by water were recorded there in 1808, a 31% increase over 1807. Shipments of ashes to make soap nearly doubled to £54,000, but those of lumber dropped by 23% to £11,200. Manufactured goods, which had expanded to £50,000 since Jay's Treaty in 1795, fell by over 20%, especially articles made near tidewater. Newspapers and manuscripts recorded more lake activity than usual, despite the theoretical reduction in shipping that should accompany an embargo. The smuggling was not restricted to water routes, as herds were readily driven across the uncontrollable land border. Southbound commerce gained two thirds overall, but furs dropped a third. Customs officials maintained a stance of vigorous enforcement throughout, and Gallatin's Enforcement Act (1809) was a party issue. Many Vermonters preferred the embargo's exciting game of revenuers versus smugglers, which brought high profits, versus mundane, low-profit normal trade.

The New England merchants who evaded the embargo were imaginative, daring, and versatile in their violation of federal law. Gordinier (2001) examines how the merchants of New London, Connecticut, organized and managed the cargoes purchased and sold and the vessels that were used during the years before, during, and after the embargo. Trade routes and cargoes, both foreign and domestic, along with the vessel types, and the ways that their ownership and management were organized show the merchants of southeastern Connecticut evinced versatility in the face of crisis.

Gordinier (2001) concludes that the versatile merchants sought alternative strategies for their commerce and, to a lesser extent, for their navigation. They tried extralegal activities, a reduction in the size of the foreign fleet, and the redocumentation of foreign trading vessels into domestic carriage. Most importantly, they sought new domestic trading partners and took advantage of the political power of Jedidiah Huntington, the Customs Collector. Huntington was an influential member of the Connecticut leadership class (called "the Standing Order") and allowed scores of embargoed vessels to depart for foreign ports under the guise of "special permission". Old modes of sharing vessel ownership to share the risk proved to be difficult to modify. Instead, established relationships continued through the embargo crisis despite numerous bankruptcies.

== Enforcement efforts ==
Jefferson's Secretary of the Treasury, Albert Gallatin, was against the entire embargo and foresaw correctly the impossibility of enforcing the policy and the negative public reaction. "As to the hope that it may... induce England to treat us better," wrote Gallatin to Jefferson shortly after the bill had become law, "I think is entirely groundless... government prohibitions do always more mischief than had been calculated; and it is not without much hesitation that a statesman should hazard to regulate the concerns of individuals as if he could do it better than themselves."

Since the bill hindered US ships from leaving American ports bound for foreign trade, it had the side effect of hindering American exploration.

=== First supplementary act ===
Just weeks later, on January 8, 1808, legislation again passed the 10th Congress, Session 1; Chapter 8: "An Act supplementary..." to the Embargo Act (2 Stat. 453). As the historian Forrest McDonald wrote, "A loophole had been discovered" in the initial enactment, "namely that coasting vessels, and fishing and whaling boats" had been exempt from the embargo, and they had been circumventing it, primarily via Canada. The supplementary act extended the bonding provision (Section 2 of the initial Embargo Act) to those of purely-domestic trades:

- Sections 1 and 2 of the supplementary act required bonding to coasting, fishing, and whaling ships and vessels. Even river boats had to post a bond.
- Section 3 made violations of either the initial or supplementary act an offense. Failure of the shipowner to comply would result in forfeiture of the ship and its cargo or a fine of double that value and the denial of credit for use in custom duties. A captain failing to comply would be fined between one and twenty thousand dollars and would forfeit the ability to swear an oath before any customs officer.
- Section 4 removed the warship exemption from applying to privateers or vessels with a letter of marque.
- Section 5 established a fine for foreign ships loading merchandise for export and allowed for its seizure.

Meanwhile, Jefferson requested authorization from Congress to raise 30,000 troops from the current standing army of 2,800, but Congress refused. With their harbors for the most part unusable in the winter anyway, New England and the northern ports of the mid-Atlantic states had paid little notice to the previous embargo acts. That was to change with the spring thaw and the passing of yet another embargo act.

With the coming of the spring, the effect of the previous acts were immediately felt throughout the coastal states, especially in New England. An economic downturn turned into a depression and caused increasing unemployment. Protests occurred up and down the eastern coast. Most merchants and shippers simply ignored the laws. On the Canada–United States border, especially in Upstate New York and in Vermont, the embargo laws were openly flouted. Federal officials believed parts of Maine, such as Passamaquoddy Bay on the border with the British territory of New Brunswick, were in open rebellion. By March, an increasingly-frustrated Jefferson had become resolved to enforce the embargo to the letter.

=== Other supplements to Act ===
On March 12, 1808, Congress passed and Jefferson signed into law yet another supplement to the Embargo Act. It prohibited for the first time all exports of any goods, whether by land or by sea. Violators were subject to a fine of $10,000, plus forfeiture of goods, per offense. It granted the President broad discretionary authority to enforce, deny, or grant exceptions to the embargo. Port authorities were authorized to seize cargoes without a warrant and to try any shipper or merchant who was thought to have merely contemplated violating the embargo.

Despite the added penalties, citizens and shippers openly ignored the embargo. Protests continued to grow and so the Jefferson administration requested and Congress rendered yet another embargo act.

== Consequences ==
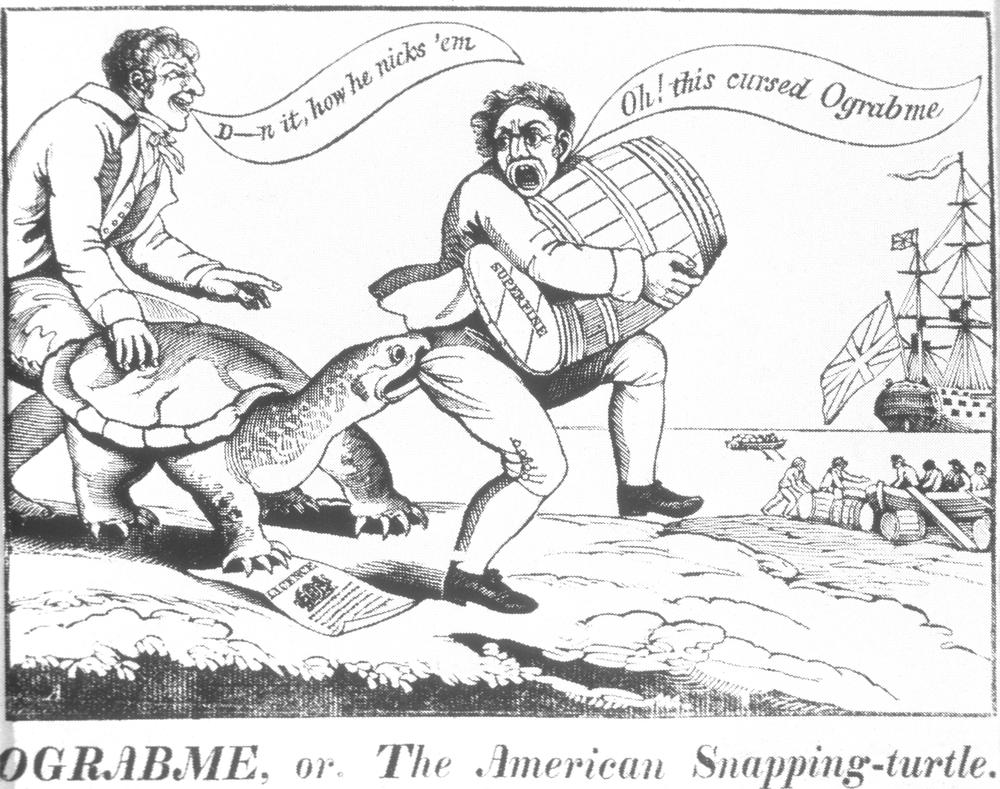
An 1807 political cartoon showing merchants caught by a snapping turtle named "Ograbme" ("Embargo" spelled backwards). The embargo was also ridiculed in the New England press as Dambargo, Mob-Rage, or Go-bar-'em.

The immediate effect of the embargo hurt the United States as much as it did Britain and France. Britain, expecting to suffer most from the American regulations, built up a new South American market for its exports, and the British shipowners were pleased that American competition had been removed by the action of the US government.

Jefferson placed himself in a strange position with his embargo policy. Though he had frequently argued for as little government intervention as possible, he now found himself assuming extraordinary powers in an attempt to enforce his policy. The presidential election of 1808 had James Madison defeat Charles Cotesworth Pinckney but showed that the Federalists were regaining strength and helped to convince Jefferson and Madison that the embargo should end. Shortly before leaving office in March 1809, Jefferson signed the repeal of the embargo.

Despite its unpopular nature, the Embargo Act had one longterm positive impact. Unfulfilled domestic demand for manufactured goods stimulated the growth of the Industrial Revolution in the United States, resulting in an emerging American domestic manufacturing system.

=== Repeal ===
On March 1, 1809, Congress passed the Non-Intercourse Act. The law enabled the President, once the wars of Europe had ended, to declare the country sufficiently safe and to allow foreign trade with certain nations.

In 1810, the government was ready to try yet another tactic of economic coercion, the desperate measure known as Macon's Bill Number 2. The bill became law on May 1, 1810, and replaced the Non-Intercourse Act. It was an acknowledgment of the failure of economic pressure to coerce the European powers. Trade with both Britain and France was now thrown open, and the US attempted to bargain with the two belligerents. If either power removed its restrictions on American commerce, the US would reapply non-intercourse against the power that had not done so.

Napoleon quickly took advantage of that opportunity. He promised that his Berlin and Milan Decrees would be repealed, and Madison reinstated non-intercourse against Britain in the fall of 1810. Though Napoleon did not fulfill his promise, the strained Anglo-American relations prevented him from being brought to task for his duplicity.

The attempts of Jefferson and Madison to secure recognition of American neutrality via peaceful means gained a belated success in June 1812, when Britain finally promised to repeal their 1807 Orders in Council. The British concession was too late since when the news had reached America, the United States had already declared the War of 1812 against Britain.

== Subsequent wartime legislation ==
America's declaration of war in mid-June 1812 was followed shortly by the Enemy Trade Act of 1812 on July 6, which employed similar restrictions as previous legislation. It was likewise ineffective and was tightened in December 1813 and debated for further tightening in December 1814. After existing embargoes expired with the onset of war, the Embargo Act of 1813 was signed into law December 17, 1813. Four new restrictions were included: an embargo prohibiting all American ships and goods from leaving port, a complete ban on certain commodities customarily produced in the British Empire, a ban against foreign ships trading in American ports unless 75% of the crew were citizens of the ship's flag, and a ban on ransoming ships. The Embargo of 1813 was the nation's last great trade restriction. Never again would the US government cut off all trade to achieve a foreign policy objective. The Act particularly hurt the Northeast since the British kept a tighter blockade on the South and thus encouraged American opposition to the administration. To make his point, the Act was not lifted by Madison until after the defeat of Napoleon, and the point was moot.

On February 15, 1815, Madison signed the Enemy Trade Act of 1815, which was tighter than any previous trade restriction including the Enforcement Act of 1809 (January 9) and the Embargo of 1813, but it would expire two weeks later when official word of peace from Ghent was received.

== See also ==
- Bibliography of Thomas Jefferson
- Second-term curse
