= War of the Fourth Coalition =

1806–1807 conflict of the Napoleonic Wars

- Part of the Napoleonic Wars and the Coalition Wars
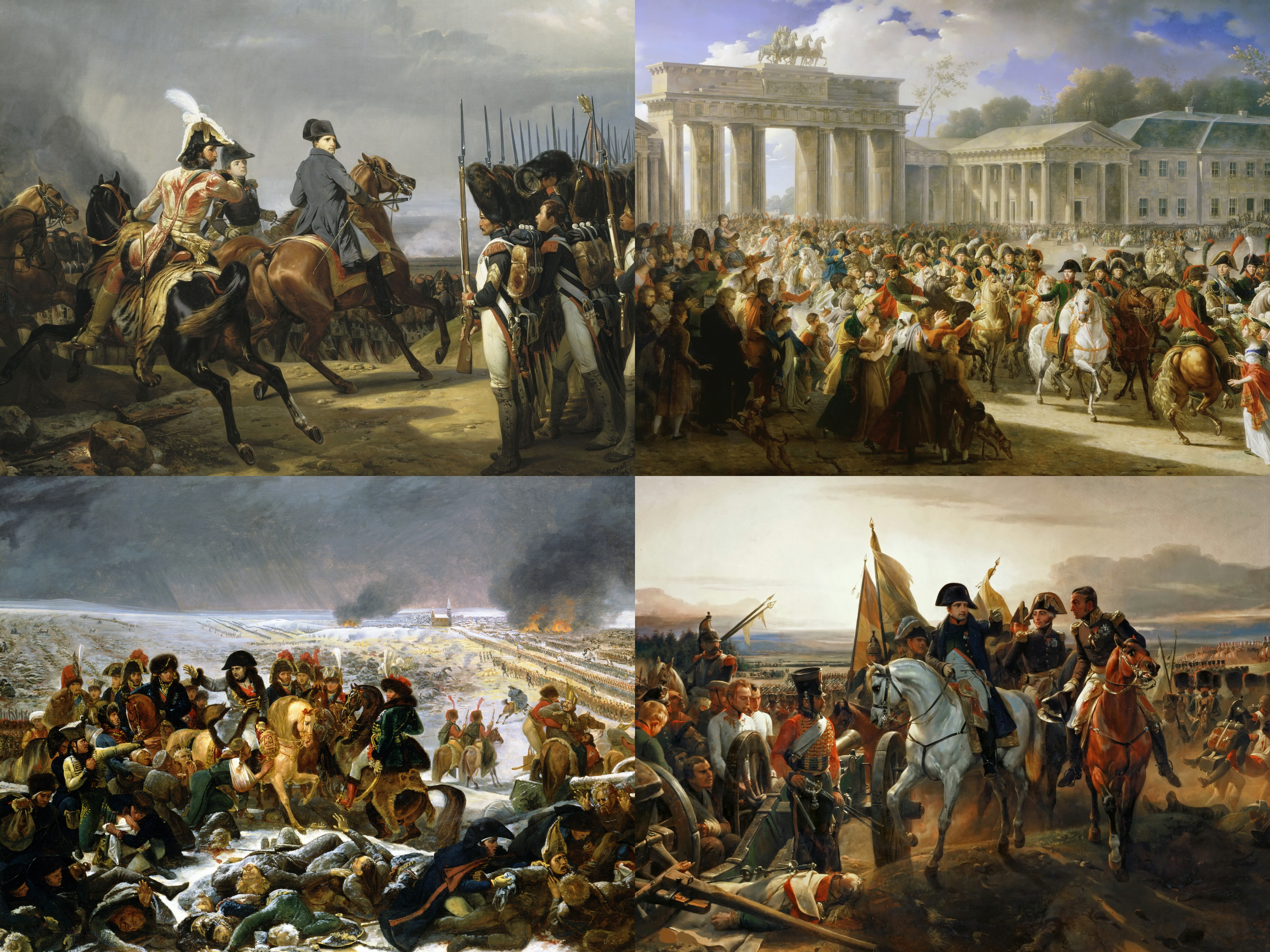
- War of the 4th Coalition Click an image to load the appropriate article. Left to right, top to bottom: Battle of Jena–Auerstedt, Fall of Berlin, Battle of Eylau and Battle of Friedland
Date	9 October 1806 – 9 July 1807 (9 months)
Location	Central Europe
Result	French victory
Territorial changes	Treaties of Tilsit; Treaty of Posen; Prussia loses over half of its territory Creation of the Duchy of Warsaw and the Kingdom of Westphalia

Belligerents
Fourth Coalition: (Kingdom of Prussia) Prussia; Russia; United Kingdom; Saxony (until 11 Dec 1806); Sweden; Sicily; Septinsular Republic (from 17th June 1807); Montenegro; Poljica (until 11 June 1807)	(First French Empire) France: Confederation of the Rhine; (Kingdom of Etruria) Etruria; Holland; (Kingdom of Italy (Napoleonic)) Italy; (Kingdom of Naples) Naples; (Kingdom of Saxony) Saxony (from 11 Dec 1806); (Ragusa (Croatia)) Ragusa; (Duchy of Warsaw) Polish Legions; (Old Swiss Confederacy) Swiss Confederation; Spanish Empire; Ottoman Empire (Duchy of Warsaw) Polish rebels Denmark

Commanders and leaders
(Kingdom of Prussia) Frederick William III; (Kingdom of Prussia) Charles William †; (Kingdom of Prussia) Gebhard Leberecht von Blücher; (Kingdom of Prussia) Prince Louis Ferdinand †; (Kingdom of Prussia) Eugene Fredrick; (Kingdom of Prussia) Count Kalckreuth; (Kingdom of Prussia) Anton Wilhelm von L'Estocq; (Kingdom of Prussia) Fredrick Louis; (Kingdom of Prussia) Ernst von Rüchel; (Kingdom of Prussia) Count Tauentzien; (Kingdom of Prussia) Ludwig Yorck; (Russian Empire) Alexander I; (Russian Empire) Levin August von Bennigsen; (Russian Empire) Mikhail Kamensky; (Russian Empire) Pyotr Bagration; (Russian Empire) Dmitry Golitsyn; (Russian Empire) Michael Andreas Barclay de Tolly; (Russian Empire) Dmitry Senyavin; (United Kingdom of Great Britain and Ireland) William Grenville; (United Kingdom of Great Britain and Ireland) William Cavendish-Bentinck; (Sweden) Gustav IV Adolf; (Sweden) Hans Henric von Essen	(First French Empire) Napoleon I; (First French Empire) Pierre Augereau; (First French Empire) Jean-Baptiste Bernadotte; (First French Empire) Jean-Baptiste Bessières; (First French Empire) Jérôme Bonaparte; (First French Empire) Louis-Nicolas Davout; (First French Empire) Jean Lannes; (First French Empire) François Joseph Lefebvre; (First French Empire) André Masséna; (First French Empire) Édouard Mortier; (First French Empire) Joachim Murat; (First French Empire) Michel Ney; (First French Empire) Jean-de-Dieu Soult; Louis I; (Kingdom of Italy (Napoleonic)) Eugène de Beauharnais; (Kingdom of Naples) Joseph I; (Duchy of Warsaw) Jan Henryk Dąbrowski; (Duchy of Warsaw) Józef Poniatowski

Strength
Total engaged: 422,000 Prussia: 254,000; Russia: 135,000; Saxony: 18,000; Sweden: 15,000	Total engaged: 237,500 French in Germany: 192,000; Confederation of Rhine: 27,000; Poland: 18,500; French in Italy: 40,000 (not engaged); French in Naples: 40,000 (not engaged); French in Holland: 18,000 (not engaged)

Casualties and losses
(Kingdom of Prussia) Prussia; 40,000+ killed or wounded 165,000 captured (9–27 October) (Russian Empire) Russia; 53,000+ killed or wounded 5,000+ captured	(First French Empire) France and allies 28,000 killed 82,000 wounded

Napoleonic Wars
List of numbered map items:
1 Third Coalition: Germany 1803:...Austerlitz...
2 Fourth Coalition: Prussia 1806:...Jena...
3 Peninsular War: Portugal 1807...Torres Vedras...
4 Peninsular War: Spain 1808...Vitoria...
5 Fifth Coalition: Austria 1809:...Wagram...
6 French invasion of Russia 1812:...Moscow...
7 Sixth Coalition: Germany 1813:...Leipzig...
8 Sixth Coalition: France 1814:...Paris...
9 Hundred Days 1815:...Waterloo...

The War of the Fourth Coalition (French: Guerre de la Quatrième Coalition) was a war spanning 1806–1807 that saw a multinational coalition fight against Napoleon's French Empire, subsequently being defeated. The main coalition partners were Prussia and Russia with Saxony, Sweden, and Great Britain also contributing. Excluding Prussia, some members of the coalition had previously been fighting France as part of the Third Coalition, and there was no intervening period of general peace. On 9 October 1806, Prussia declared war on France and joined a renewed coalition, fearing the rise in French power after the defeat of Austria and establishment of the French-sponsored Confederation of the Rhine in addition to having learned of French plans to cede Prussian-desired Hanover to Britain in exchange for peace. Prussia and Russia mobilized for a fresh campaign with France, massing troops in Saxony.

Napoleon decisively defeated the Prussians in an expeditious campaign that culminated at the Battle of Jena–Auerstedt on 14 October 1806. French forces under Napoleon occupied Prussia, pursued the remnants of the shattered Prussian Army, and captured Berlin. They then advanced all the way to East Prussia, Poland and the Russian frontier, where they fought an inconclusive battle against the Russians at the Battle of Eylau on 7–8 February 1807. Napoleon's advance on the Russian frontier was briefly checked during the spring as he revitalized his army with fresh supplies. Russian forces were finally crushed by the French at the Battle of Friedland on 14 June 1807, and three days later Russia asked for a truce. The war also saw the end of the British invasions of the River Plate where two unsuccessful British attempts to seize control of the Spanish colony of the Viceroyalty of the Río de la Plata, located around the River Plate in South America when the Spanish Empire was still an ally of Napoleonic France against Britain.

Through the Treaties of Tilsit in July 1807, France made peace with Russia, which agreed to join the Continental System. The treaty was particularly harsh on Prussia, however, as Napoleon demanded much of the Prussian territory along the lower Rhine west of the Elbe and in what was part of the former Polish–Lithuanian Commonwealth. Respectively, these acquisitions were incorporated into the new Kingdom of Westphalia, led by his brother Jérôme Bonaparte and into the new Duchy of Warsaw, a Polish client state, ruled by his new ally the king of Saxony. At the end of the war, there was peace on Continental Europe with Napoleon as master of almost all of western and central continental Europe, except for Spain, Portugal, Austria and several other smaller states.

Despite the end of the Fourth Coalition, Britain remained at war with France. War would return to Continental Europe later in 1807, when Napoleon decided to invade Portugal in order to compel Portugal to join the Continental System. A joint Franco-Spanish force invaded Britain's ally Portugal, beginning the Peninsular War where Napoleon would also invade Spain as well. A further Fifth Coalition would be assembled when Austria re-joined the conflict in 1809.

== Origins ==
The Fourth Coalition (1806–1807) of Great Britain, Prussia, Russia, Saxony, and Sweden formed against France within months of the collapse of the previous coalition. Following his triumph at the Battle of Austerlitz and the subsequent demise of the Third Coalition, Napoleon looked forward to achieving a general peace in Europe, especially with his two main remaining antagonists, Britain and Russia. Meanwhile, he sought to isolate Prussia from the influence of these two powers by offering a tentative alliance, while also seeking to curb Prussia's political and military influence among the German states.

Despite the death of William Pitt in January 1806, Britain and the new Whig administration remained committed to checking the growing power of France. Peace overtures between the two nations early in the new year proved ineffectual due to the still unresolved issues that had led to the breakdown of the Peace of Amiens. One point of contention was the fate of Hanover, a German state in personal union with the British monarchy that had been occupied by France since 1803. Dispute over this state would eventually become a casus belli for both Britain and Prussia against France. This issue also dragged Sweden into the war, whose forces had been deployed there as part of the effort to liberate Hanover during the war of the previous coalition. The path to war seemed inevitable after French forces ejected the Swedish troops in April 1806.

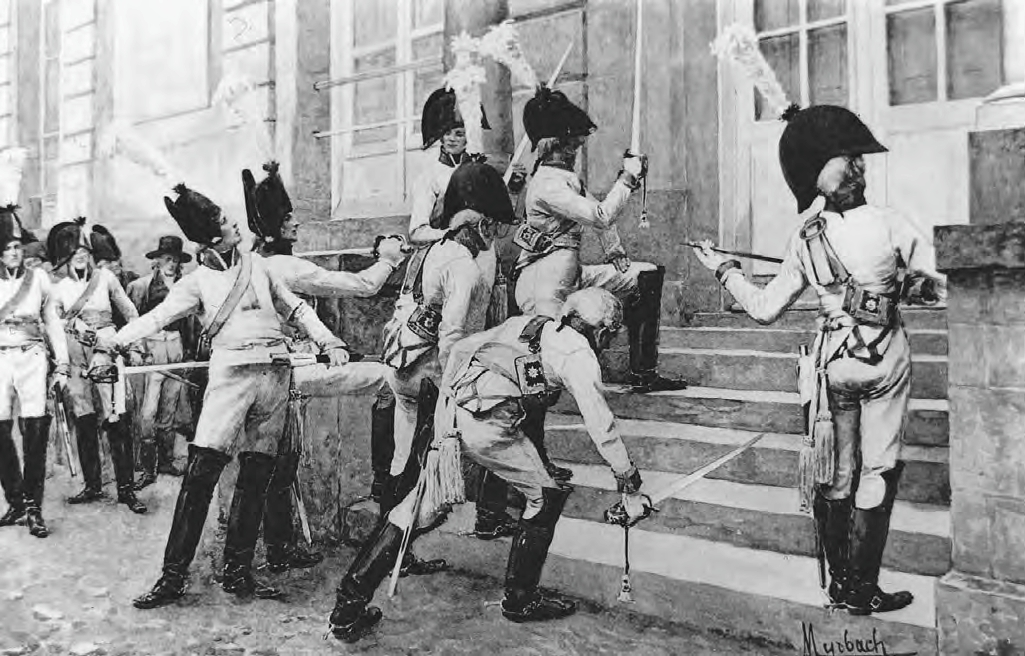
Officers of the élite Prussian Gardes du Corps, wishing to provoke war, ostentatiously sharpen their swords on the steps of the French embassy in Berlin in the autumn of 1806 (drawing by Felician Myrbach)

Apart from some naval clashes and the peripheral Battle of Maida in southern Italy in July 1806 (though these actions are considered part of the tail end of the War of the Third Coalition), the main conflicts between Britain and France during the Fourth Coalition would involve no direct general military confrontation. Rather, there was an escalation in the ongoing economic warfare between the two powers. With Britain still retaining its dominance of the seas, Napoleon looked to break this dominance (after his defeat of Prussia) with his issuance of the Berlin Decree and the beginnings of his Continental System. Britain retaliated with its Orders in Council several months later.

In the meantime, Russia spent most of 1806 recovering from defeats from the previous year's campaign. Napoleon had hoped to establish peace with Russia and a tentative peace treaty was signed in July 1806, but this was vetoed by Tsar Alexander I and the two powers remained at war. Though nominally an ally in the coalition, Russia remained a dormant entity for much of the year (giving virtually no military aid to Prussia in the main battles that October, as Russian armies were still mobilising). Russian forces would not fully come into play in the war until late 1806 when Napoleon entered Poland.

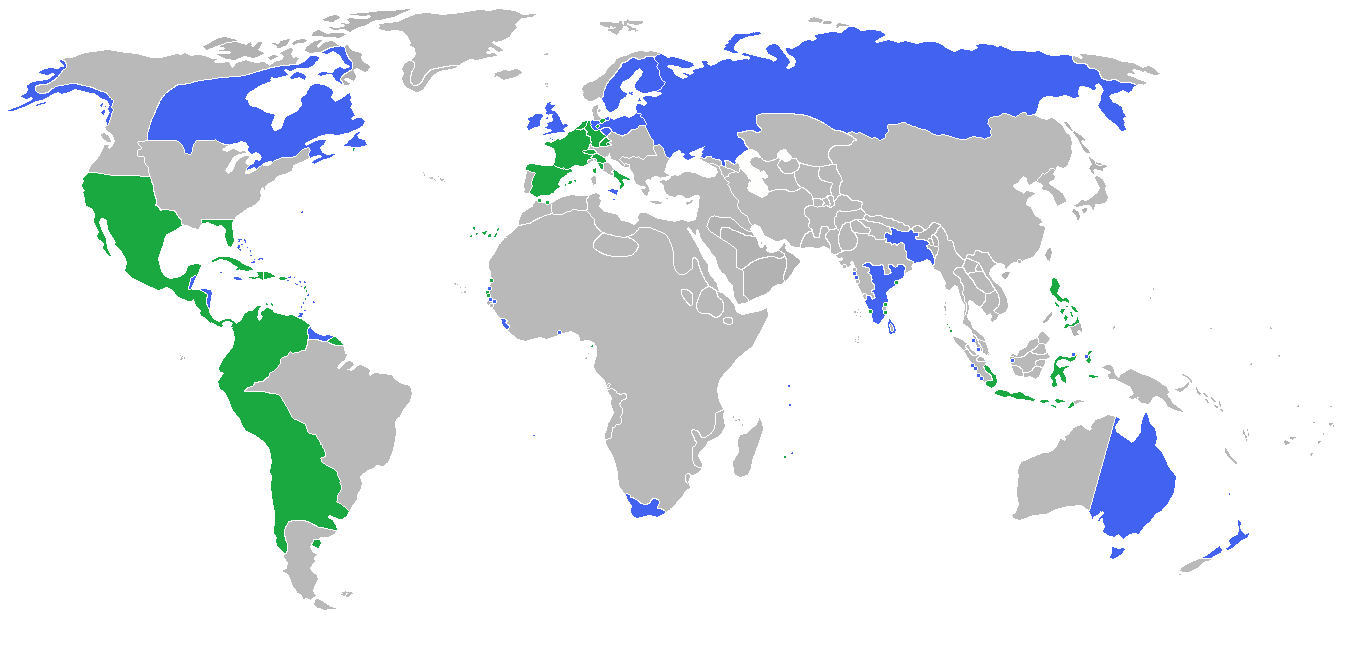
The participants of the War of the Fourth Coalition. Blue: The Coalition and their colonies and allies. Green: The First French Empire, its protectorates, colonies and allies.

Finally, Prussia had remained at peace with France the previous year, though it did come close to joining the Allies in the Third Coalition. A French corps led by Marshal Bernadotte had illegally violated the neutrality of Ansbach in Prussian territory on their march to face the Austrians and Russians. Anger by Prussia at this trespass was quickly tempered by the results of Austerlitz, and a convention of continued peace with France was signed two weeks after that battle at Schönbrunn. This convention was modified in a formal treaty two months later, with one clause in effect promising to give Hanover to Prussia in exchange for Ansbach's being awarded to France's ally Bavaria. In addition, on 15 March 1806 Napoleon elevated his brother-in-law Marshal Joachim Murat to become ruler of the Grand Duchy of Berg and Duchy of Cleves (acquired from Bavaria in return for its receiving Ansbach). Murat exacerbated Prussian enmity by tactlessly ejecting a Prussian garrison that was stationed in his newly acquired realm, prompting a stern rebuke from Napoleon. Relations between France and Prussia quickly soured when Prussia eventually discovered that Napoleon had secretly promised to return sovereignty of Hanover back to Britain during his abortive peace negotiations with the British. This duplicity by the French would be one of the main causes for Prussia declaring war that autumn.

Another cause was Napoleon's formation in July 1806 of the Confederation of the Rhine out of the various German states which constituted the Rhineland and other parts of western Germany. A virtual satellite of the French Empire with Napoleon as its "Protector", the Confederation was intended to act as a buffer state from any future aggressions from Austria, Russia or Prussia against France (a policy that was an heir of the French revolutionary doctrine of maintaining France's "natural frontiers"). The formation of the Confederation was the final nail in the coffin of the moribund Holy Roman Empire and subsequently its last Habsburg emperor, Francis II, formally abolished the empire. Napoleon consolidated the various smaller states of the former Holy Roman Empire which had allied with France into larger electorates, duchies and kingdoms to make the governance of non-Prussian and Austrian Germany more efficient. He also elevated the electors of the two largest Confederation states, his allies Württemberg and Bavaria, to the status of kings.

The Confederation was above all a military alliance: in return for continued French protection, member states were compelled to supply France with large numbers of their own military personnel (mainly to serve as auxiliaries to the Grande Armée), as well as contribute much of the resources needed to support the French armies still occupying western and southern Germany. Prussia was indignant at this increasing French meddling in the affairs of Germany (without its involvement or even consultation) and viewed it as a threat. Napoleon had previously attempted to ameliorate Prussian anxieties by assuring Prussia he was not averse to its heading a North German Confederation, but his duplicity regarding Hanover dashed this. A final spark leading to war was the summary arrest and execution of German nationalist Johann Philipp Palm in August 1806 for publishing a pamphlet which strongly attacked Napoleon and the conduct of his army occupying Germany. After giving Napoleon an ultimatum on 1 October 1806, Prussia (supported by Saxony) finally decided to contend militarily with the French Emperor.

== Prussian campaign ==
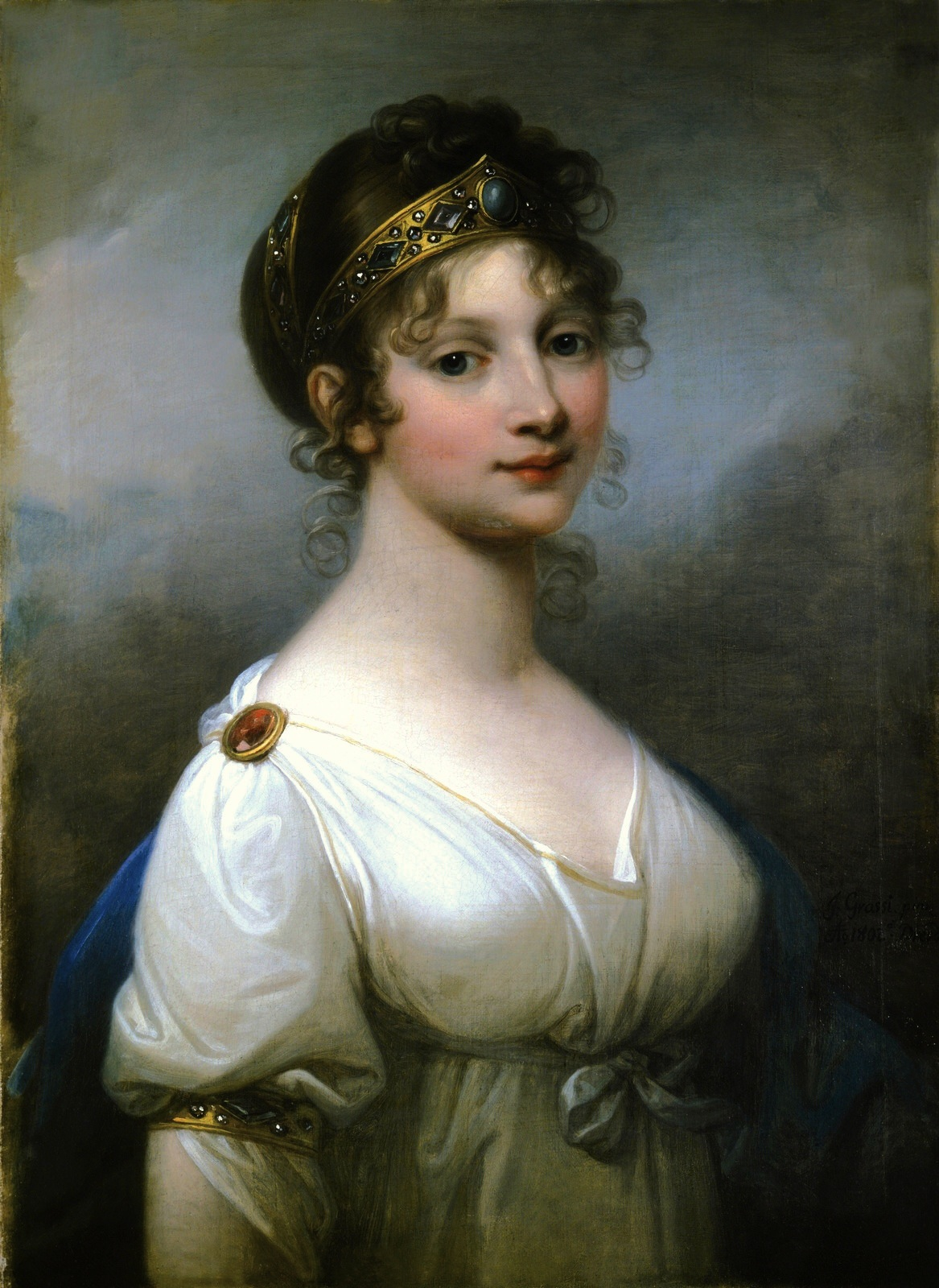
Queen Louise

In August 1806, the Prussian king Frederick William III made the decision to go to war independently of any other great power, save the distant Russia, influenced by his wife Queen Louise and the war party in Berlin. Another course of action might have involved openly declaring war the previous year and joining Austria and Russia in the Third Coalition. In fact, the Tsar had visited the Prussian king and queen at the tomb of Frederick the Great in Potsdam that very autumn, and the monarchs secretly swore to make common cause against Napoleon. Had Prussian forces been engaged against the French in 1805, this might have contained Napoleon and prevented the eventual Allied disaster at Austerlitz. In any event, Prussia vacillated in the face of the swift French invasion of Austria and then hastily professed neutrality once the Third Coalition was crushed. When Prussia did declare war against France in 1806, its main ally the Russians still remained far away remobilising. The Electorate of Saxony would be Prussia's sole German ally. Napoleon could scarcely believe Prussia would be so foolish to take him on in a straight fight with hardly any allies at hand on its side, especially since most of his Grande Armée was still in the heart of Germany close to the Prussian border. He drummed up support from his soldiers by declaring that Prussia's bellicose actions had delayed their phased withdrawal back home to France to enjoy praise for the previous year's victories.

The initial military manoeuvres began in September 1806. In a letter to Marshal Soult detailing the plan for the campaign, Napoleon described the essential features of Napoleonic warfare and introduced the phrase le bataillon-carré ("square battalion"). In the bataillon-carré system, the various corps of the Grande Armée would march uniformly together in close supporting distance. If any single corps was attacked, the others could quickly spring into action and arrive to help. Napoleon unleashed all French forces east of the Rhine, deploying the corps of the Grande Armée along the frontier of southern Saxony. In a preemptive strike to catch the Prussians unaware, the Emperor had the Grande Armée march as a massive bataillon carré (battalion square) in three parallel columns through the Franconian Forest in southern Thuringia. Each corps would be in mutual supporting distance of each other, both within the column and laterally to the other columns (once through the difficult passage of the forest), thus allowing the Grande Armée to meet the enemy at any contingency.

This strategy was adopted due to Napoleon's lack of intelligence regarding the Prussian main army's whereabouts and uncertainty over his enemy's puzzling manoeuvres in their march to face him. The reason for the Prussian scheme of manoeuvre stemmed mainly from the mutual mistrust within the Prussian high command. This had resulted in division among the Prussian commanders over which plan of action for the war would be adopted. Despite the deficiency in pinpointing the main Prussian army's exact position, Napoleon correctly surmised their probable concentration in the vicinity of Erfurt-Weimar and formulated a general plan of a thrust down the Saale valley towards Gera and Leipzig, then wheeling westward in order to envelop the left flank of where he believed the Prussians were located, thus cutting off their communications and line of retreat to Berlin.

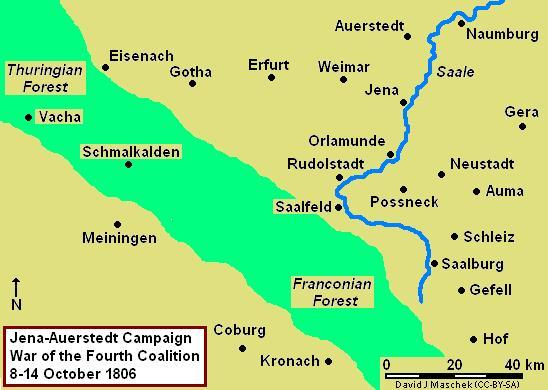
Jena-Auerstedt Campaign, October 1806

On 8 October 1806, after a cavalry skirmish at Saalburg, a Prussian division was brushed aside in the Battle of Schleiz on 9 October. The following day, Marshal Lannes, debouching from the passage of the forest, crushed a Prussian division at Battle of Saalfeld, where the popular Prince Louis Ferdinand was killed.

At the double Battle of Jena-Auerstedt on 14 October, Napoleon smashed a Prussian army led by Frederick Louis, Prince of Hohenlohe-Ingelfingen and Ernst von Rüchel at Jena, while his Marshal Louis-Nicolas Davout routed Charles William Ferdinand, Duke of Brunswick's main army at Auerstedt. At Jena, Napoleon fought only a contingent of the Prussian army. At Auerstedt a single French corps defeated the bulk of the Prussian army, despite being heavily outnumbered. Victory at Auerstedt was all but secured once the Duke of Brunswick (as well as fellow commander Friedrich Wilhelm Carl von Schmettau) were both mortally wounded. Prussian command devolved to the less-able King Fredrick William, who believed he was facing Napoleon himself. Matters worsened once the vanquished remnants of the Prussian army from Jena stumbled onto the clash at Auerstedt, further plunging the Prussians' morale and triggering their precipitous retreat. For this conspicuous victory, Marshal Davout was later created the Duke of Auerstedt by Napoleon.

During the Battle of Jena-Auerstedt, Marshal Jean-Baptiste Bernadotte had marched from Naumburg to Dornburg and arrived at Apolda late in the day, due to the poor state of the roads. Apolda sits on strategically important heights between Auerstedt to the North and Jena to the South, and Napoleon had ordered Bernadotte to move to Dornburg and seize Apolda; upon establishing his artillery on the heights, Bernadotte compelled the Prussians to withdraw from Jena and Auerstedt. Napoleon, believing Bernadotte to be a coward due to his absence in either battle, nearly court-martialed him. On 17 October, Bernadotte mauled Eugene Frederick Henry, Duke of Württemberg's previously untouched Reserve corps at the Battle of Halle and chased it across the Elbe river, this redeeming himself in Napoleon's eyes.

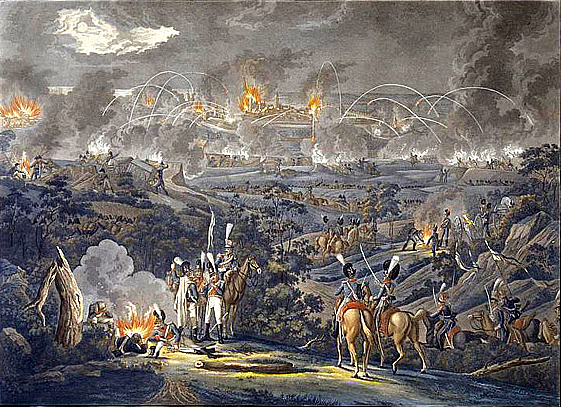
The Siege of Danzig, 1807

Some 160,000 French soldiers fought against Prussia, French numbers increasing as the campaign went on, with reinforcements arriving across the Wesel bridgehead from the peripheral theatre surrounding the recently formed Kingdom of Holland. Collectively, the French advanced with such speed that Napoleon was able to destroy as an effective military force almost the entire quarter of a million-strong Prussian army. The Prussians sustained 65,000 casualties, including the deaths of two members of the royal family. They lost a further 150,000 prisoners, over 4,000 artillery pieces, and over 100,000 muskets stockpiled in Berlin. The French suffered around 15,000 casualties for the whole campaign. Napoleon entered Berlin on 27 October 1806 and visited the tomb of Frederick the Great, telling his marshals to show their respect, saying, "If he were alive we wouldn't be here today".

In total, Napoleon and the Grande Armée had taken only 19 days from the commencement of the invasion until essentially knocking Prussia out of the war with the capture of Berlin, following the earlier destruction of its principal armies at Jena and Auerstedt. The majority of the remnants of the Prussian army and the displaced royal family escaped to refuge in East Prussia, near Königsberg, eventually linking up with the approaching Russians, thus allowing the remnants of the Prussian state to continue the fight into 1807. Meanwhile, on 11 December 1806, the Treaty of Posen elevated Saxony to a kingdom, upon it allying with France and joining the Confederation of the Rhine, thereby leaving the Allied Coalition.

On 21 November 1806, Napoleon issued the Berlin Decree to bring into effect the Continental System. This policy aimed to control the trade of all European countries without consulting their governments. The ostensible goal was to weaken the British economy by closing French-controlled territory to its trade, but British merchants smuggled in many goods and the Continental System proved ineffective as a weapon of economic war.

== Polish, Russian and Swedish campaigns ==
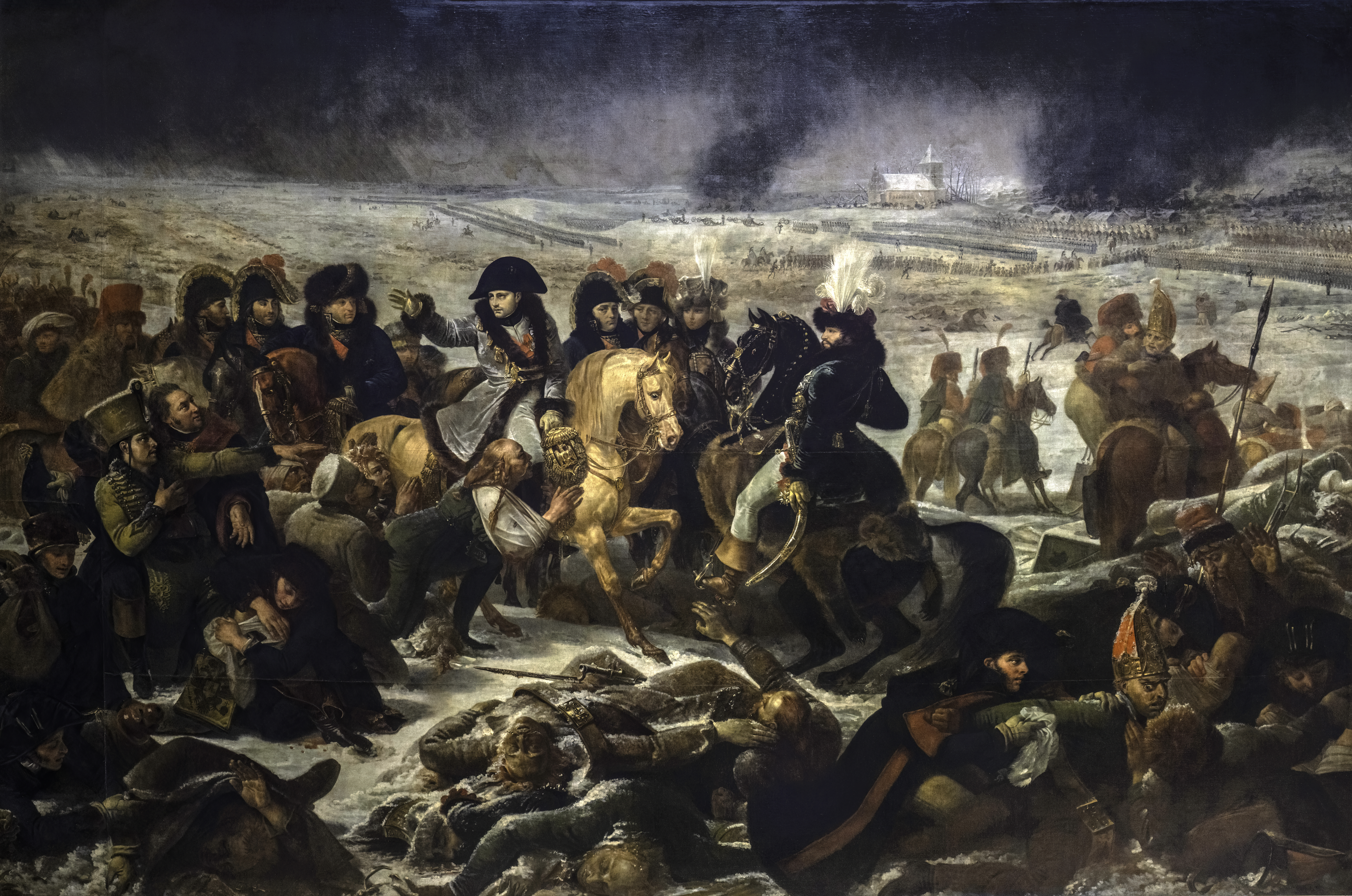
Aftermath of the Battle of Eylau

Towards the end of 1806, the French entered Poland and Napoleon created a new Duchy of Warsaw, to be ruled by his new ally Frederick Augustus I of Saxony. The area of the duchy had already been liberated by a popular uprising that had escalated from anti-conscription rioting. Napoleon then turned north to confront the approaching Russian armies and to attempt to capture the temporary Prussian capital at Königsberg. In pursuit of this aim, twice his attempts to entrap and defeat Bennigsen's Russian 1st Army at Pultusk and in the vicinity of Heilsberg during the turn of the year were thwarted. A tactical and bloody draw at Eylau (7–8 February) forced the Russians to withdraw further north. After spending much of the spring recuperating his forces, Napoleon finally routed the Russian army at Friedland (14 June). Following this defeat, Alexander sued for peace with Napoleon at Tilsit (7 July 1807).

Meanwhile, Swedish involvement was primarily concerned with protecting Swedish Pomerania. Despite being defeated at Lübeck, the Swedes successfully defended the fort of Stralsund and pushed the French forces out of Swedish Pomerania in early April, 1807. On 18 April, France and Sweden agreed to a ceasefire. However, Swedish refusal to join the Continental System led to a second invasion of Swedish Pomerania led by Marshal Brune. Stralsund fell on 24 August after a siege and the Swedish army abandoned Rügen, thus leaving France in control over Swedish Pomerania; the resulting armistice, agreed by Marshal Brune and Swedish general Johan Christopher Toll, had allowed the Swedish army to withdraw with all its munitions of war.

== Results ==
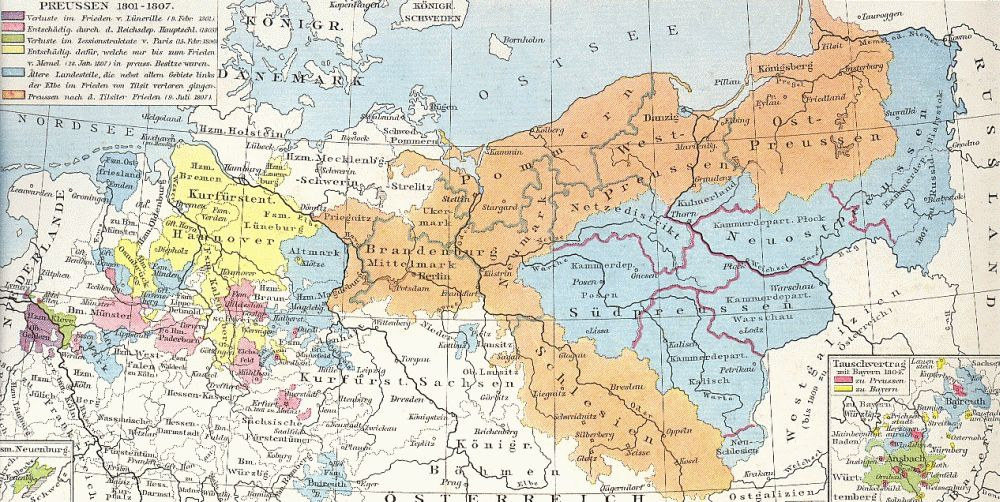
Prussia (orange) and its territories lost at Tilsit (other colours)

Following the Treaties of Tilsit, Britain and Sweden remained the only two major coalition members still at war with France. Russia soon declared war against Britain and after a British attack on Copenhagen, Denmark–Norway joined the war on the side of Napoleon (Gunboat War), opening a second front against Sweden. A short British expedition under Sir John Moore was sent to Sweden (May 1808) to protect against any possible Franco-Danish invasion.

At the Congress of Erfurt (September–October 1808) Napoleon and Alexander agreed that Russia should force Sweden to join the Continental System, which led to the Finnish War of 1808–1809 (meaning Sweden played no role in the next coalition against Napoleon) and to the division of Sweden into two parts separated by the Gulf of Bothnia. The eastern part became the Russian Grand Duchy of Finland. Due to the Continental System, Britain was yet again still at war with Napoleon and was not affected by the peace treaty.

In negotiations with captured Swedes after the Battle of Lübeck, Marshal Bernadotte first came to the attention of the Swedish authorities. This would set in motion a chain of events that eventually led to him being elected heir to the Swedish throne, and later King Charles XIV John of Sweden.

As for the French, after the Treaty of Tilsit, the Empire was seemingly at its zenith. Flush with triumph and deeming France free from any immediate obligations in Central and Eastern Europe, Napoleon decided to capture the Iberian ports of Britain's long-time ally Portugal. His main aim was to close off another strip of the European coast and a major source for British trade.

On 27 October 1807, Spain's Prime Minister Manuel de Godoy signed the Treaty of Fontainebleau with France, by which in return for the alliance and passage of French armies through its realm, Spain would receive Portuguese territory. In November 1807, after the refusal of Prince Regent John of Portugal to join the Continental System, Napoleon sent an army into Spain under General Jean-Andoche Junot with the aim of invading Portugal (as well as the secret task of being the vanguard for the eventual French occupation of Spain). Napoleon soon embroiled himself and France in Spain's internal power struggles within its royal family, eventually leading to the Spanish populace turning on the French occupiers and the beginning of the Peninsular War.

== See also ==
- Gunboat War
- List of battles of the War of the Fourth Coalition
- Napoleonic Wars
- Peninsular War
- War of the Fifth Coalition
- War of the Third Coalition
- Coalition forces of the Napoleonic Wars

== Bibliography ==
- Broers, Michael (1996). Europe under Napoleon 1799-1815. London: Arnold. ISBN 0340662654.
- Bruun, Geofrey; et al. (The New Cambridge Modern History) (2008). "The Balance of Power during the Wars". War and Peace in the Age of Upheaval 1793-1830. Vol. IX. Cambridge: Cambridge University Press. ISBN 0-521-04547-9.
- Chandler, David G. (1979). Dictionary of the Napoleonic Wars. London: Macmillan. OCLC 4932949.
- Chandler, David G. (1966). The Campaigns of Napoleon. New York: Scribner. ISBN 0-02-523660-1.
- Chandler, David G. (1993). Jena 1806: Napoleon destroys Prussia. Osprey military campaign series (Repr. ed.). Oxford: Osprey. ISBN 978-1-85532-285-1.
- Clodfelter, Micheal (2017). Warfare and armed conflicts: a statistical encyclopedia of casualty and other figures, 1492–2015 (4th ed.). Jefferson, North Carolina: McFarland & Co., Inc., Publishers. ISBN 978-0-7864-7470-7.
- Leggiere, Michael V. (2014). Blucher: Scourge of Napoleon. University of Oklahoma Press. ISBN 978-0-8061-4567-9.
- McLynn, Frank (1997). Napoleon : a biography. London: Jonathan Cape. ISBN 0224040723.
- Schroeder, Paul W. (1994). The transformation of European politics, 1763–1848. Oxford history of modern Europe (Reprinted ed.). Oxford: Clarendon Press. pp. 287–333. ISBN 978-0-19-822119-7.
- Taylor, Brian (2006). The empire of the French: a chronology of the Revolutionary and Napoleonic Wars 1792-1815. Stroud: Spellmount. ISBN 1862272549.
