= Entry of Napoleon into Berlin =

Painting by Charles Meynier

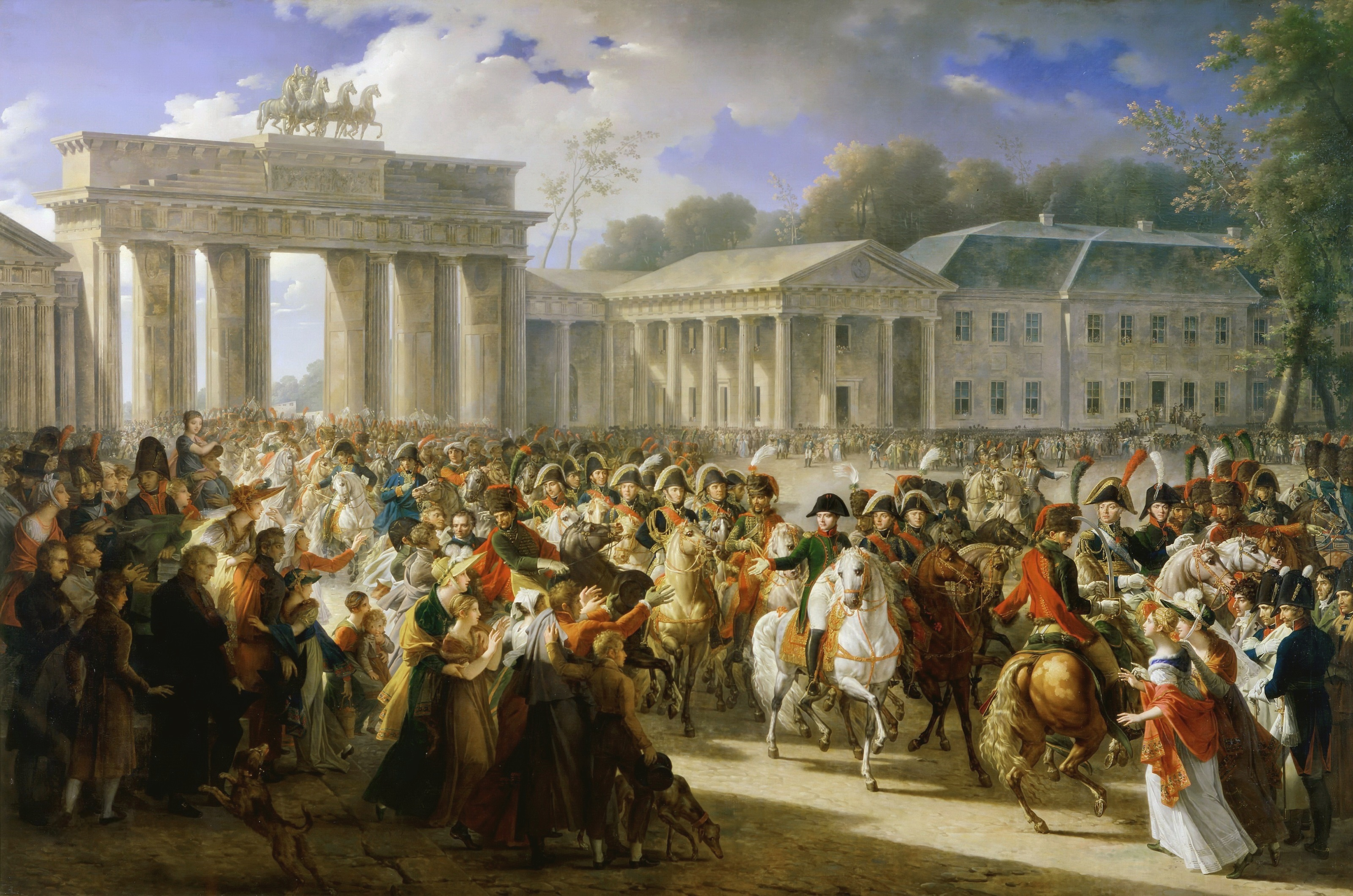
- Artist: Charles Meynier
- Year: 1810
- Type: Oil on canvas, history painting
- Dimensions: 363 cm × 493 cm (143 in × 194 in)
- Location: Palace of Versailles; Versailles

Entry of Napoleon into Berlin is an 1810 painting by the French artist Charles Meynier. It depicts the entry of the French Emperor Napoleon into the Prussian capital Berlin on 27 October 1806, following his victory at the Battle of Jena. The Fall of Berlin marked a high point in the success of Napoleon and he issued the Berlin Decree from the city, implementing the Continental System aimed at strangling European trade with the United Kingdom.

Meynier was a contemporary of Jacques-Louis David, and painted a number of French patriot scenes. It depicts Napoleon riding into the city with the Brandenburg Gate in the background. Today the painting is part of the collection of the Palace of Versailles just outside Paris.

== Bibliography ==
- Edwards, Catharine. Roman Presences: Receptions of Rome in European Culture, 1789-1945. Cambridge University Press, 1999.
- Tulard, Jean. L'histoire de Napoléon par la peinture. Archipel, 2005.
- Schurr, Gérald. 1820-1920, les petits maîtres de la peinture: valeur de demain, Volume 3. Editions de l'Amateur, 1975.
