= Fall of Berlin (1806) =

Capture of Berlin during the War of the Fourth Coalition

- Part of the War of the Fourth Coalition
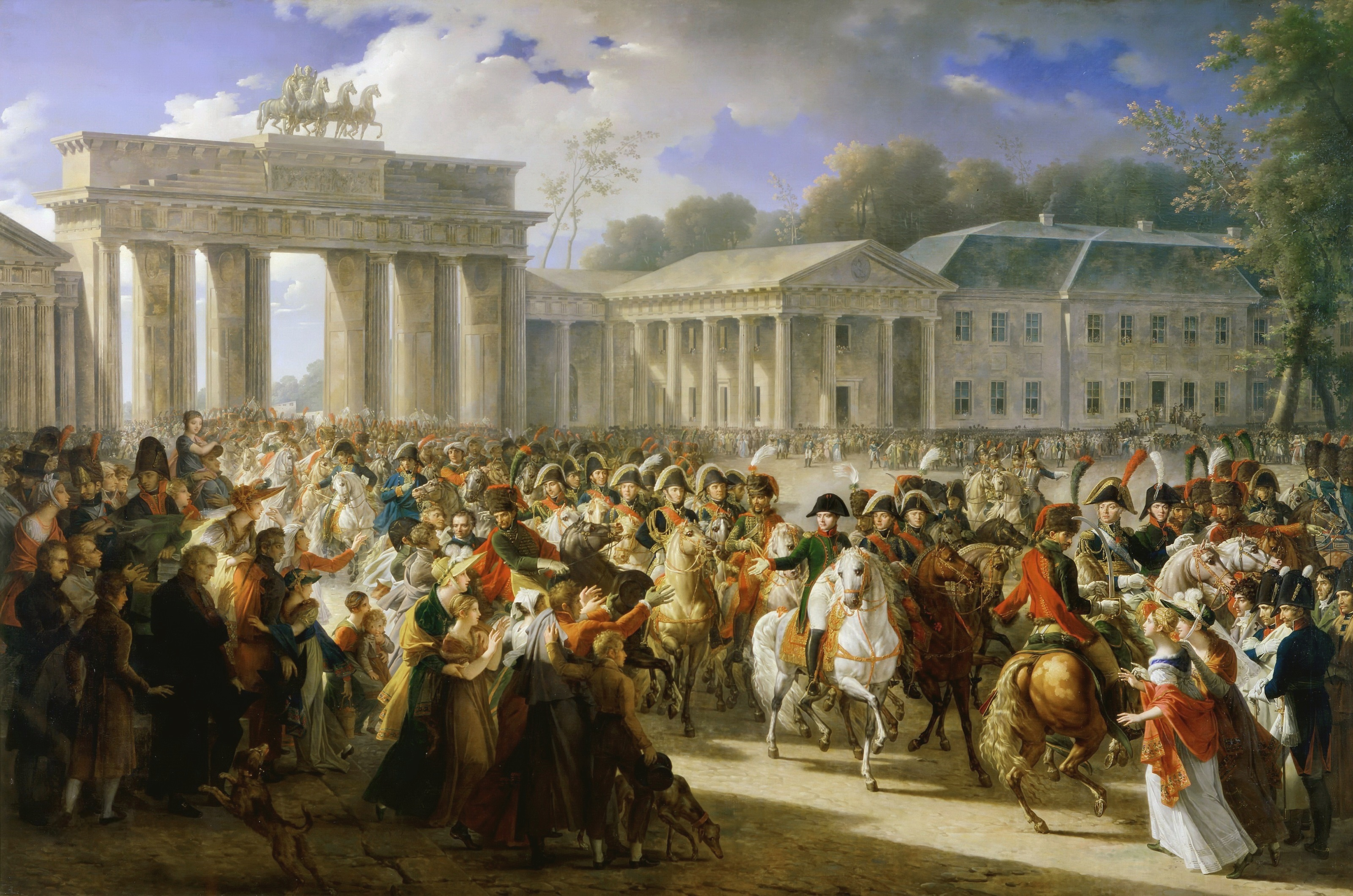
- Entry of Napoleon into Berlin; Charles Meynier, 1810
Date	24 October 1806
Location	Berlin, Kingdom of Prussia 52°31′12″N 13°24′18″E
Result	French victory

Belligerents
French Empire	Kingdom of Prussia

Commanders and leaders
(First French Empire) Napoleon I	(Kingdom of Prussia) Frederick William III
- Location within Europe

War of the Fourth Coalition
⬤ current battle
⬤ Napoleon not in command
⬤ Napoleon in command

The fall of Berlin took place on 24 October 1806 when the Prussian capital of Berlin was captured by French forces in the aftermath of the Battle of Jena–Auerstedt. Berlin fell 15 days after the beginning of the war. The French Emperor Napoleon entered the city after three days without a fight, from which he issued his Berlin Decree implementing his Continental System. Large-scale plundering of Berlin took place.

== Aftermath ==
The subsequent Battle of Eylau, the Battle of Friedland and the Treaty of Tilsit compelled Prussia to cede large portions of its territories and accept French garrisons in its major fortresses and settlements. Prussia became a client state of France, forced to pay large indemnities, and Berlin itself remained occupied until early 1813. A garrison was also established at the nearby Spandau Citadel.

Following Napoleon's Retreat from Moscow in 1812, Prussian forces serving as auxiliaries for the French switched sides and supported Russia. This, combined with major uprisings across Prussian territory, forced French troops to retreat and abandon Berlin. The city then became a major target for the French who attempted to recapture it during the German campaign of 1813, ending only with the complete French withdrawal following the Battle of Leipzig.

== Impact ==
Although Berlin had previously briefly been raided two times (in 1757 and 1760) during the Seven Years' War, its occupation was a major blow to the Prussian leadership. It destroyed the reputation the Prussian Army had gained during the days of Frederick the Great. After arriving in Berlin, Napoleon visited the tomb of Frederick and is reported to have said to his marshals "Hats off gentlemen, if he were alive we wouldn’t be here today". This became an iconic scene in German culture, portrayed in Prussian films such as Old Fritz (1927) and Kolberg (1945).

In the wake of the fall of Berlin, a major reform movement was launched to restore the fighting effectiveness of the Prussian Army and renew the nation at large in order to plan a war of revenge against France. The reformed Prussian forces playing a key role in the subsequent French retreat from Germany in 1813–14, and during Napoleon's final defeat during the Waterloo campaign in 1815.
