= Treaty of Poznań =

1806 peace treaty between France and Saxony

The Treaty of Poznań (or Treaty of Posen) was signed on 11 December 1806 in Poznań and ended the war between the French Empire and the Electorate of Saxony. The latter was an ally of Prussia as a member of the Fourth Coalition against France. It was defeated in the battles of Jena and Auerstedt and partially occupied by French troops. The peace treaty was negotiated, for the French, by Charles Maurice de Talleyrand. According to its terms, the electorate became the Kingdom of Saxony and annexed certain territories (including Cottbus) taken from Prussia. It was required to join the Confederation of the Rhine and pay France an indemnity of 25 million francs. It had to contribute a small contingent for the ongoing French campaign against the coalition and place 20,000 troops at French disposal in any future war. Saxony also had to cede a small amount of territory in its west to the new Kingdom of Westphalia.
