= Milan Decree =

1807 decree by Napoleon banning trade with the British

The Milan Decree was issued on 17 December 1807 by Napoleon I of France to enforce the 1806 Berlin Decree, which had initiated the Continental System, the basis for his plan to defeat the British by waging economic warfare.

The Milan Decree stated that no country in Europe was to trade with the United Kingdom. It was a direct response to the British Orders in Council (1807), under which ships from any country trading with France could be seized by the Royal Navy.

== Content ==
The decree authorised French warships and privateers to capture neutral ships sailing from any port in the British Isles or other territories under British control. It also declared that any ships that submitted to search by the Royal Navy on the high seas were to be considered lawful prizes if they were captured by the French.

== Text ==
(Translation)

At Our Royal Palace at Milan, December 17, 1807.

Napoleon, Emperor of the French, King of Italy, Protector of the Confederation of the Rhine;

In view of the measures adopted by the British government on the 11th of November last by which vessels belonging to powers which are neutral or are friendly and even allied with England are rendered liable to be searched by British cruisers, detained at certain stations in England, and subject to an arbitrary tax of a certain per cent upon their cargo to be regulated by English legislation;

Considering that by these acts the English government has denationalized the vessels of all the nations of Europe and that no government may compromise in any degree its independence or its rights—all the rulers of Europe being jointly responsible for the sovereignty and independence of their flags—and that, if through unpardonable weakness which would be regarded by posterity as an indelible stain, such tyranny should be admitted and become consecrated by custom, the English would take steps to give it the force of law, as they have already taken advantage of the toleration of the governments to establish the infamous principle that the flag does not cover the goods and to give the right of blockade an arbitrary extension which threatens the sovereignty of every state;

We have decreed and do decree as follows:

Article 1. Every vessel of whatever nationality, which shall submit to be searched by an English vessel or shall consent to a voyage to England or shall pay any tax whatever to the English government, is ipso facto declared denationalized, loses the protection afforded by its flag, and becomes English property.

Article 2. Should such vessels which are thus denationalized through the arbitrary measures of the English government enter our ports or those of our allies or fall into the hands of our ships of war or of our privateers, they shall be regarded as good and lawful prizes.

Article 3. The British Isles are proclaimed to be in a state of blockade both by land and by sea. Every vessel of whatever nation or whatever may be its cargo that sails from the ports of England or from those of the English colonies or of countries occupied by English troops or is bound for England or for any of the English colonies or any country occupied by English troops becomes, by violating the present decree, a lawful prize and may be captured by our ships of war and adjudged to the captor.

Article 4. These measures, which are only a just retaliation against the barbarous system adopted by the English government, which models its legislation upon that of Algiers, shall cease to have any effect in the case of those nations which shall force the English to respect their flags. They shall continue in force so long as that government shall refuse to accept the principles of international law which regulate the relations of civilized states in a state of war. The provisions of the present decree shall be ipso facto abrogated and void so soon as the English government shall abide again by the principles of the law of nations, which are at the same time those of justice and honor.

Article 5. All our ministers are charged with the execution of the present decree, which shall be printed in the Bulletin des lois.

(Signed) Napoleon
