= Berlin Decree =

1806 decree by Napoleon to blockade Britain

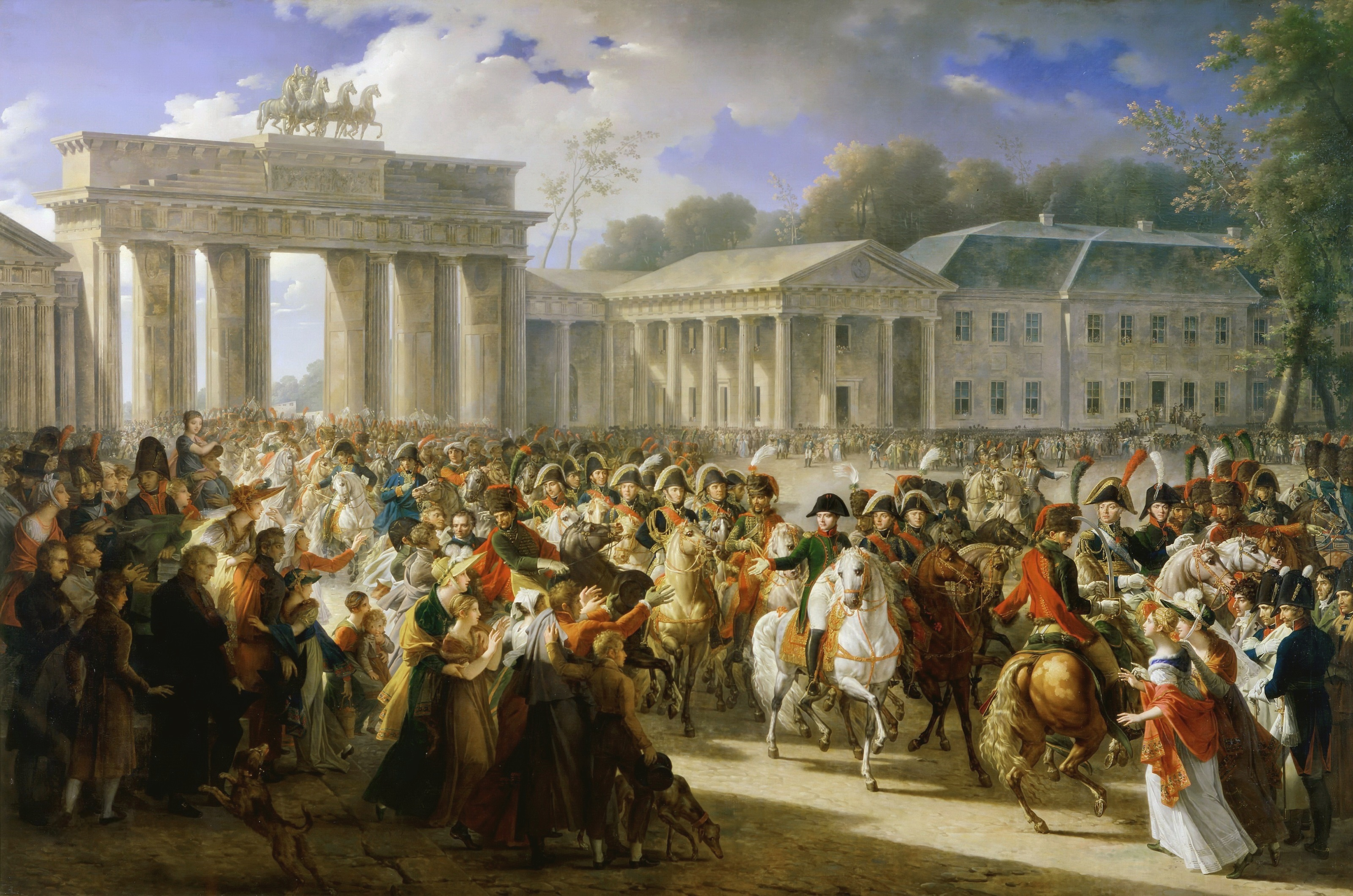
The Entry of Napoleon into Berlin by Charles Meynier. In the wake of his victory over Prussia Napoleon issued his decree.

The Berlin Decree was issued in Berlin by Napoleon on November 21, 1806, after the French success against Prussia at the Battle of Jena, which led to the Fall of Berlin. The decree was issued in response to the British Order-in-Council of 16 May 1806 by which the Royal Navy instituted a blockade of all ports from Brest to the Elbe.

The decree proclaimed that "the British Isles are declared to be in a state of blockade" and forbade all correspondence or commerce with Great Britain. All British subjects found in the territory of France or its allies were to be arrested as prisoners of war and all British goods or merchandise seized. Any vessel found contravening the decree and landing in a continental port from a port of Britain or its colonies was to be treated as if it were British property and therefore liable to confiscation, along with all of its cargo.

The goal of the so-called Continental System was to force Britain's government to the peace table by starving its people of trade with Europe and thereby wrecking their economy. However, the blockade's effectiveness was difficult to enforce over so vast an area and was generally unpopular among French subjects and allies. Historian Paul Schroeder considers it to have proved an ineffective method of economic warfare.

The Continental System eventually led to economic ruin for France and its allies. Less damage was done to the economy of Britain, which had control of the Atlantic Ocean trade. Other European nations removed themselves from the Continental System, which led in part to the downfall of Napoleon.

The Milan Decree, for the same purpose, was issued the following year.
