= Orders in Council (1807) =

British economic decrees targeting Napoleon

The 1807 Orders in Council were a series of decrees, in the form of Orders in Council, issued by the British Privy Council during the Napoleonic Wars as part of a policy of commercial warfare. They played a major role in shaping the British war effort against the First French Empire and its allies, but also contributed to the worsening of relations between Britain and other Western powers. The 1807 Orders in Council played a major role in the deterioration of Anglo-American relations which led to the War of 1812.

== Terminology ==
Formally, an "Order in Council" is an order by the Sovereign at a meeting of the Privy Council by which the British government decrees policies. This type of legislation is still used on occasion, particularly in the exercise of the Royal Prerogative.

Especially in American history, the term "the Orders in Council" is also used collectively to refer to the group of such orders in the late 18th and early 19th centuries which restricted neutral trade and enforced a naval blockade of Napoleonic France and its allies. In total, the collective term "Orders in Council" refers to more than a dozen sets of blockade decrees in the years 1783, 1793, 1794, 1798, 1799, 1803–1809, 1811, and 1812; it is most often associated in particular with the decrees of 7 January 1807, 11 November 1807, and 26 April 1809 which were most inflammatory to the Americans.

== Background ==
By 1806, Napoleon was master of continental Europe, effectively locking Great Britain out of the continent. However, the defeat of the French and Spanish navies at the Battle of Trafalgar (1805) ended any thoughts of an invasion of Great Britain. Napoleon, aware of British commercial strength, thus resorted to a policy of economic warfare, in what became known as the Continental System.

=== British Order in Council of 16 May 1806 ===
In response to a British Order in Council of 16 May 1806, which had declared all ports from Brest to the Elbe to be under a state of blockade, Napoleon issued the Berlin Decree of 21 November 1806, which forbade French, allied or neutral ships to trade with Britain. By this means, Napoleon hoped to destroy British trade, disrupt its growing industrial expansion, diminish its credit, and ultimately force a peace settlement.

=== British Orders in Council of 1807 ===
Great Britain responded with the Orders in Council of 1807 issued on 6 January and 11 November 1807, extending the range and scope of the blockade instituted the previous year. These forbade French trade with Great Britain, its allies, or neutrals, and instructed the Royal Navy to blockade French and allied ports. This order required all shipment to stop in British-controlled ports to be checked for military supplies that could be used by France. Ships that did not stop to be checked at such ports were liable to be seized or impounded.

=== Milan Decree of 1807 ===
On 17 December 1807, Napoleon retaliated with the Milan Decree, which declared that all neutral shipping using British ports, or paying British tariffs, were to be regarded as British and seized.

== Consequences ==
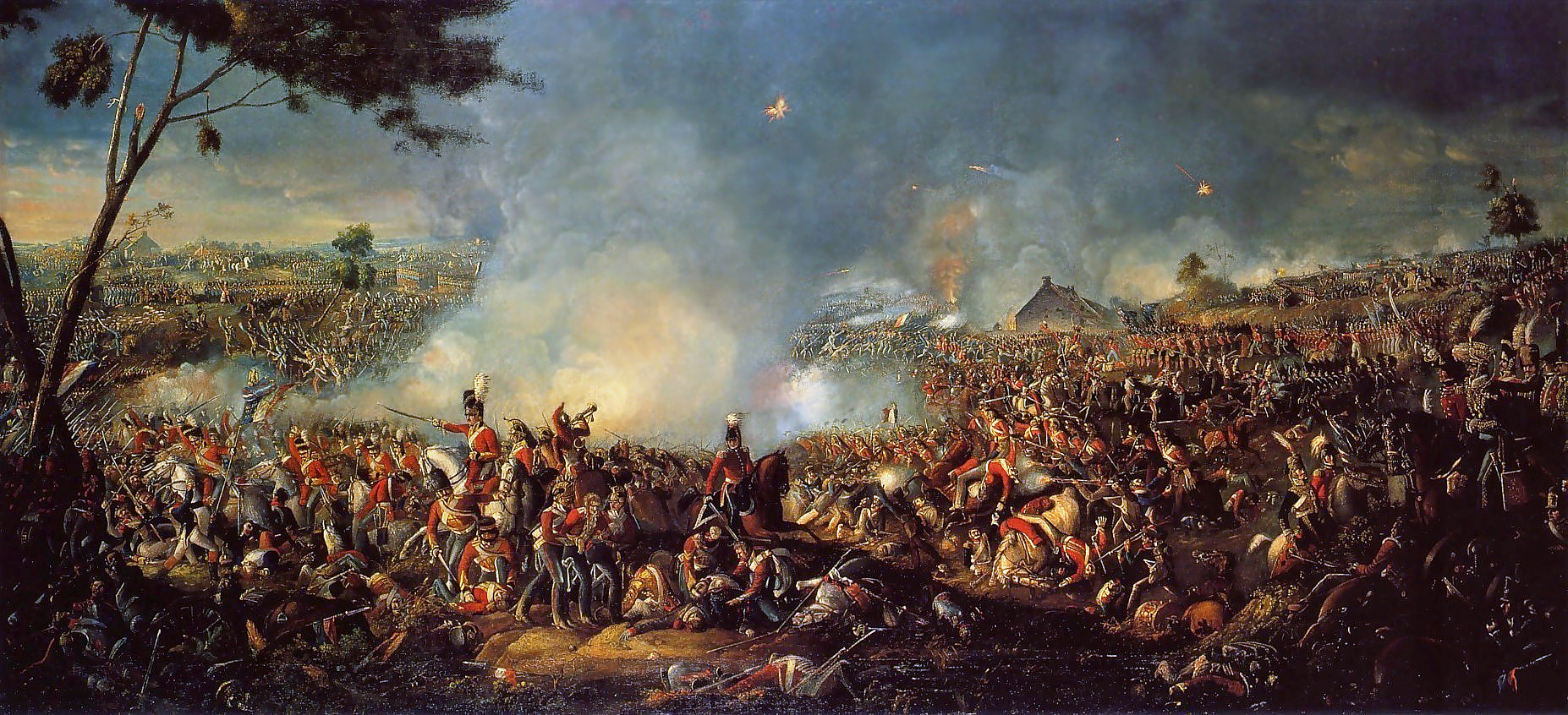
The Battle of Waterloo, which ended the Orders in Council as a source of political concern

Due to the strength of the Royal Navy, the British blockade of continental Europe was reasonably effective. French trade suffered, and its primitive industrial revolution was set back. Great Britain, on the other hand, actually increased trade with its overseas colonies over the period. Smuggling persisted, and even Napoleon made exceptions to his embargo so he could procure necessary supplies for his war effort. More significantly, enforcing the economic blockades led both Great Britain and France into a series of military engagements. The British bombarded Copenhagen in September 1807 (Battle of Copenhagen) to prevent the Danish joining the Continental System.

The British policy of stopping neutral ships trading with France played a large part in the outbreak of the Anglo-American War of 1812 (the three laws most offensive to the Americans were in fact repealed five days after the declaration of war, but before Prime Minister Lord Liverpool was aware of it). However, it was the French invasion of Russia in the same year, again in part to enforce the continental system, that proved to be the turning point of the war. France was never able to recover militarily from that defeat. The economic warfare ended with Napoleon's final defeat in 1815.

== Repeal of the Orders in Council ==
The British made their greatest concession to the United States in June 1812. On 16 June 1812, two days before the United States declaration of war, Lord Castlereagh, the Secretary of State for Foreign Affairs announced in Parliament that the Order in Council would be suspended.

On the very day that the Minister took his formal leave from the United States, 23 June 1812, a new British government headed by Lord Liverpool provisionally repealed the Order in Council.

Forty-one days after the United States Congress declared war, the news reached London on 29 July 1812. Two days later, the Ministry ordered its first counter-measures. It forbade British ships to sail except in convoys, and restrained American ships in British ports. The Orders in Council had been repealed on 23 June 1812, but the ministers did not intend to take additional measures until they could learn the American reaction. Word of the repeal of the Orders did not reach President James Madison until 12 August 1812, some fifty days later. Even then he refused to halt hostilities because he did not know how Britain had reacted to the declaration of war.
