= Continental System =

1806–1814 embargo of Europe against Britain

The French Empire in 1812 Directly administered Client states Continental System

The Continental System or Continental Blockade (French: Blocus continental) was a large-scale embargo by French emperor Napoleon I against the British Empire from 21 November 1806 until 11 April 1814, during the Napoleonic Wars. Napoleon issued the Berlin Decree on 21 November 1806 in response to the naval blockade of the French coasts enacted by the British government on 16 May 1806. The embargo was applied intermittently, ending on 11 April 1814 after Napoleon's first abdication.

Aside from subduing Britain, the blockade was also intended to establish French industrial and commercial hegemony in Europe. Within the French Empire, the newly acquired territories and client states were subordinate to France itself, as there was a unified market within France (no internal barriers or tariffs) while economic distortions were maintained on the borders of the new territories.

The Berlin Decree forbade the import of British goods into any European country allied with or dependent upon France, and it installed the Continental System in Europe. All connections with Britain were to be cut, even mail. However, there was extensive smuggling, which made the Continental System an ineffective weapon of economic war. There was some damage to British trade, especially in 1808 and 1812, but British control of the oceans led to replacement trade with North and South America, as well as large scale smuggling in Europe particularly from Malta, which was used by the British to sell their goods to southern Italy.

The loss of Britain as a trading partner also hit the economies of France and its allies. Angry governments gained an incentive to ignore the Continental System, which led to the weakening of Napoleon's coalition. As Napoleon realised that extensive trade was going through Spain and Russia, he invaded those two countries. One portion of his forces were tied down in Spain (in which the Spanish War of Independence occurred simultaneously), and the other portion suffered severely in, and ultimately retreated from, Russia in 1812.

== Background ==
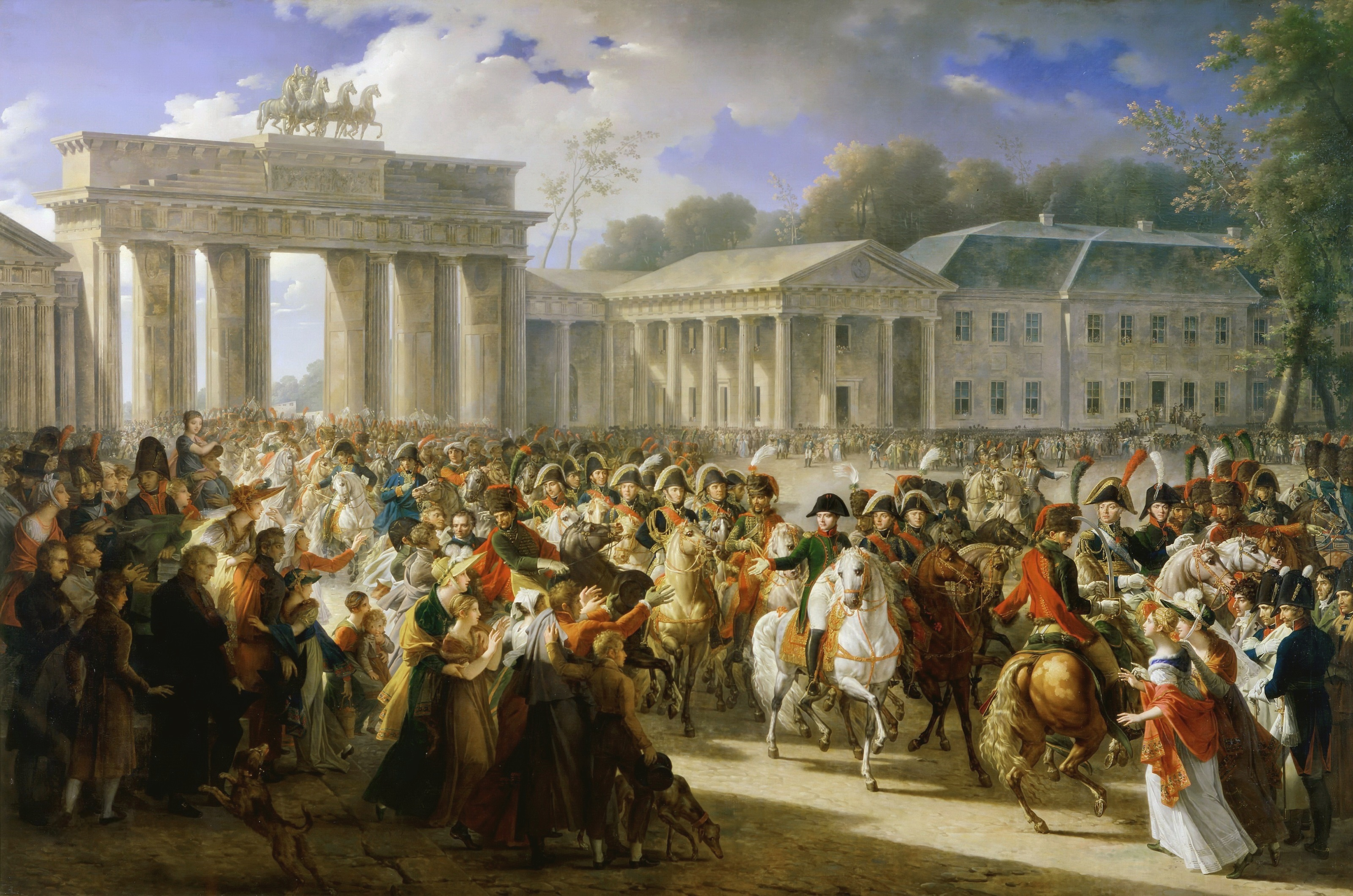
The fall of Berlin, following which Napoleon introduced the Berlin Decree

Britain declared war on France in May 1803, beginning the Napoleonic Wars, during which the British government repeatedly financed French enemies in Continental Europe. Napoleon, as with previous French rulers before him, were unable to defeat the British by means of invading Britain due to the Royal Navy's control of the sea. From 1803 to 1805, Napoleon made plans to invade Britain, assembling a large army at the Camp of Boulogne. However, he called off the invasion in August 1805 and marched his army to Ulm. On 21 October 1805, the British navy inflicted a major defeat on a Franco-Spanish fleet at Trafalgar, which led to Napoleon definitively abandoning plans to invade Britain and instead turning to economic warfare. With his ministers, he began drawing up plans to force the British to sue for peace by cutting off Britain's trade with the rest of Europe.

On 16 May 1806, the Royal Navy imposed a naval blockade of French and French-allied coasts, increasing Napoleon's desire to implement a strategy of economic warfare against Britain, then Europe's manufacturing and business center as a result of the Industrial Revolution. In October 1806, the French occupied Berlin, bringing swathes of Prussia under Napoleon's control. In November 1806, having recently conquered or allied with every major power on the European continent, Napoleon, in response to the British Order in Council of 17 May 1806 blockading all French-controlled ports from Brest to the Elbe, issued the Berlin Decree forbidding his allies and conquests from trading with the British. Britain responded with further orders in council issued on 10 January and 11 November 1807. These forbade French trade with Britain, its allies or neutrals, and instructed the Royal Navy to blockade all French and allied ports, and to prevent all shipping whether neutral or not. Napoleon responded again with the Milan Decree of 1807, declaring that all neutral shipping using British ports or paying British tariffs were to be regarded as British and seized.

Napoleon's plan to defeat Britain was to destroy its ability to trade. As an island nation, trade was its most vital lifeline. Napoleon believed that if he could isolate Britain economically, he would be able to invade the nation after its economic collapse. Napoleon decreed that all commercial ships wishing to do business in Europe must first stop at a French port in order to ensure that there could be no trade with Britain. He also ordered all European nations and French allies to stop trading with Britain, and he threatened Russia with an invasion if they did not comply as well. His orders backfired in the Iberian Peninsula, especially in Portugal (being allied to Britain), setting off the Peninsular War. He pushed Russia too hard, both in terms of the Continental System, and in his demands for control over part of Poland. Napoleon's 1812 invasion of Russia was a disaster which set the stage for his downfall.

== Effects ==
=== British Empire ===
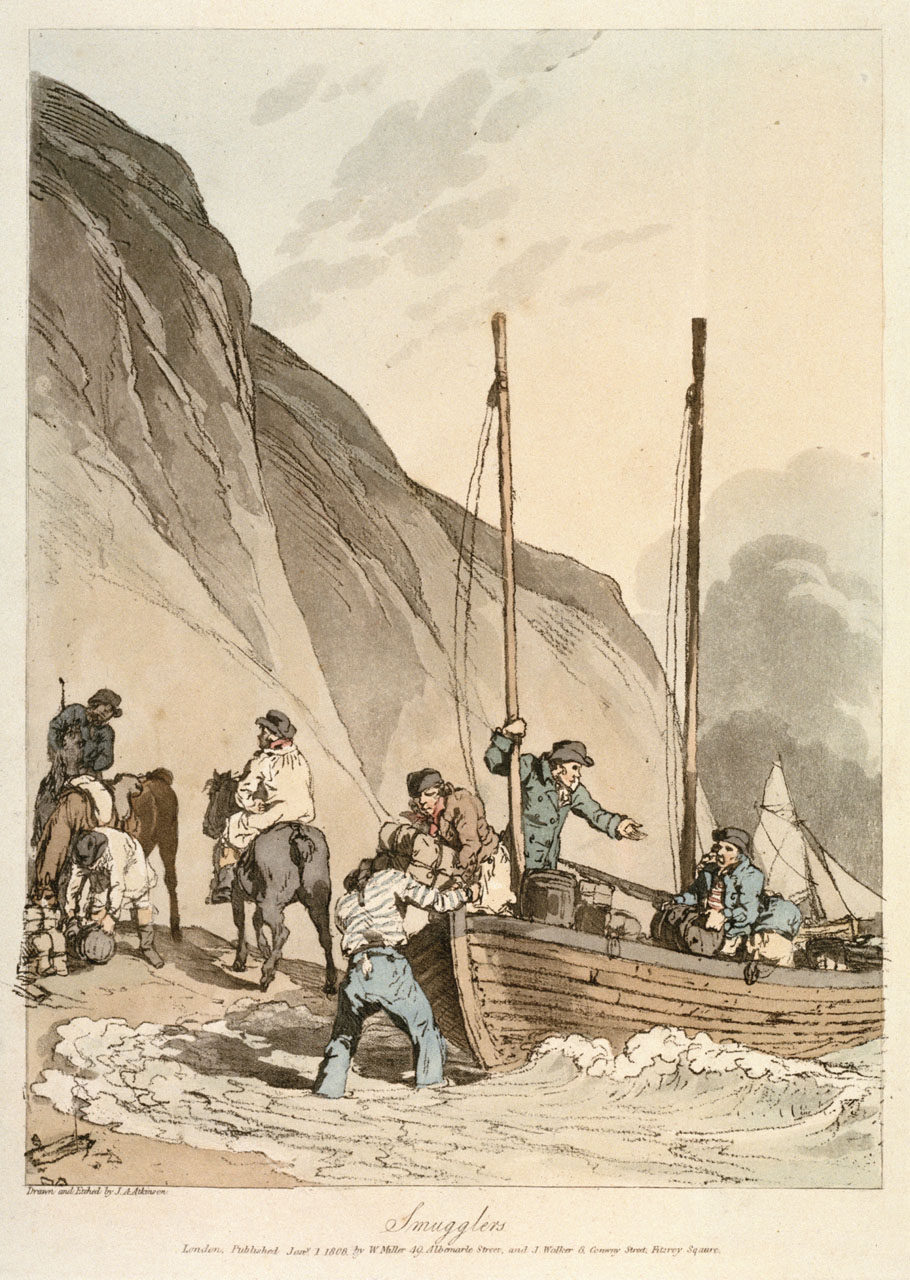
1808 engraving of British smugglers working against the Continental System

The Continental System had mixed effects on British trade. The embargo encouraged British merchants to seek out new markets aggressively and to engage in smuggling with continental Europe. Napoleon's exclusively land-based customs enforcers could not stop British smugglers, especially as these operated with the connivance of Napoleon's chosen rulers of Spain, Westphalia, and other German states. British exports to the continent fell between 25% and 55% compared to pre-1806 levels. However, trade sharply increased with the rest of the world, covering much of the decline.

In response to the Continental System, British orders in council prohibited other countries (that is, its trade partners) from trading with France. If they chose to trade with France or otherwise comply with the Continental System, the orders in council threatened to respond with punitive measures. This double threat created a difficult time for neutral nations like the United States. In response to this prohibition, the U.S. government adopted the Embargo Act of 1807 and eventually Macon's Bill Number 2. This embargo was designed as an economic counterattack to hurt Britain, but it proved even more damaging to American merchants. Together with Britain's impressment of sailors from American ships and support for Indian resistance to U.S. colonization, tensions led to the US declaring war on Britain, sparking the War of 1812. This war, not Napoleon's blockade, sharply reduced British trade with the United States.

The blockade did not cause significant economic damage to the British, although British exports to the continent as a proportion of the country's total trade dropped from 55% to 25% between 1802 and 1806. However, the British economy suffered greatly from 1810 to 1812, especially in terms of high unemployment and inflation. This led to widespread protest and violence, but the middle classes and upper classes strongly supported the government, which used the Yeomanry and militia to suppress the working class unrest, especially the Luddite movement.

=== France and continental Europe ===
The episode seriously hurt France itself. Shipbuilding, and its trades such as rope-making, declined, as did many other industries that relied on overseas markets, such as the linen industries. With few exports and lost profits, many industries were closed down. Southern France, especially the port cities of Marseille and Bordeaux, as well as the city of La Rochelle, suffered from the reduction in trade. Moreover, the prices of staple foods rose in most of continental Europe.

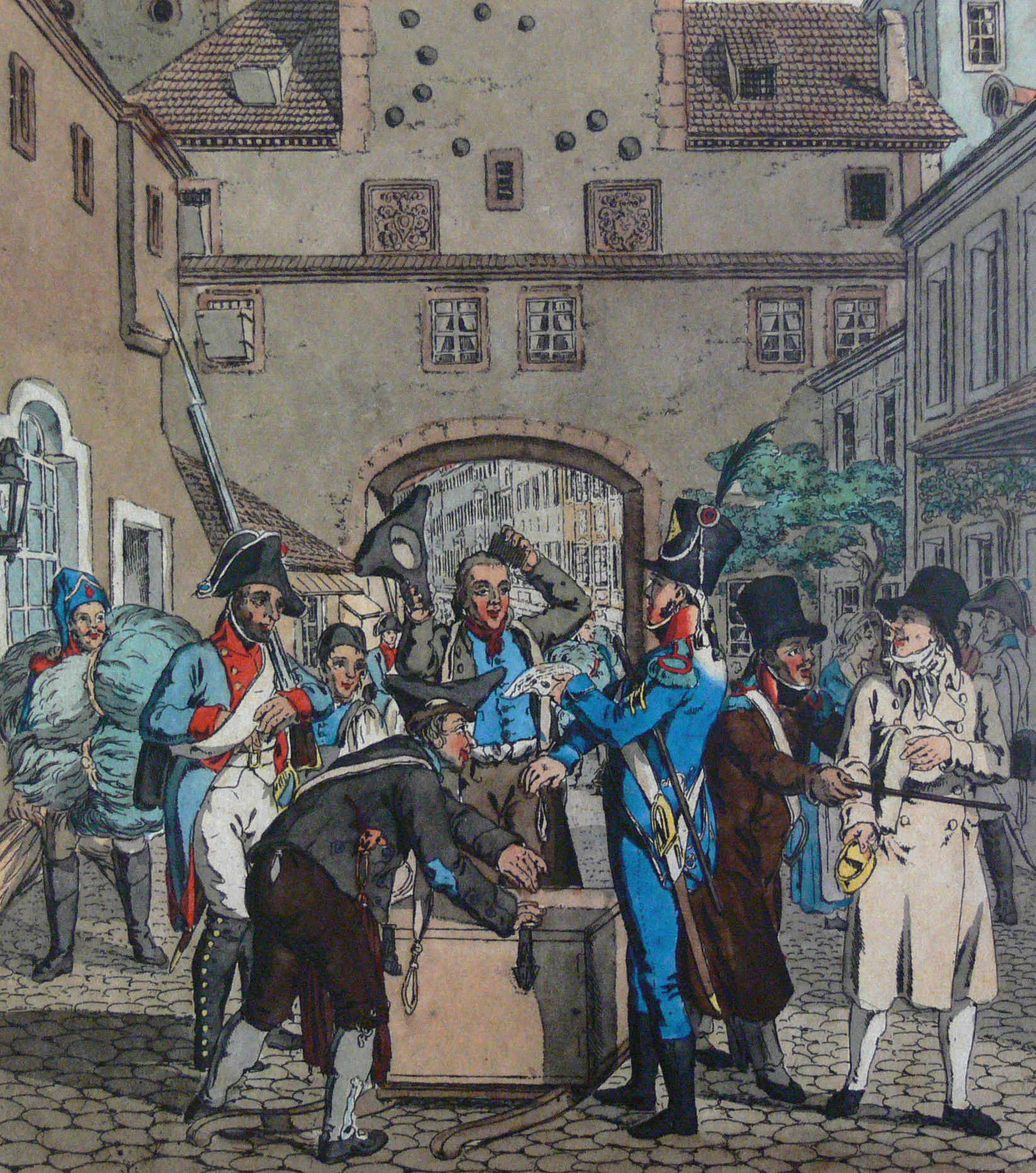
French troops inspecting goods for British contraband in Leipzig in 1806

Napoleon's St. Cloud Decree in July 1810 opened the southwest of France and the Spanish frontier to limited British trade, and reopened French trade to the United States. It was an admission that his blockade had hurt his own economy more than the British. It had also failed to reduce British financial support for its allies. The industrialised north and east of France, and Wallonia (the south of present-day Belgium) saw significantly increased profits due to the lack of competition from British goods (particularly textiles, which were produced much more cheaply in Britain).

In Italy, the agricultural sector flourished; but the Dutch economy, predicated on trade, suffered greatly as a result of the embargo. Napoleon's economic warfare was much to the chagrin of his own brother, King Louis I of Holland.

=== Scandinavia and the Baltic region ===
Britain's first response to the Continental System was to launch a major naval attack on the weakest link in Napoleon's coalition, Denmark. Although ostensibly neutral, Denmark was under heavy French and Russian pressure to pledge its fleet to Napoleon. London could not take the chance of ignoring the Danish threat. In the Second Battle of Copenhagen in August–September 1807, the Royal Navy bombarded Copenhagen, seized the Danish fleet, and assured control of the sea lanes in the North Sea and Baltic Sea for the British merchant fleet. The island of Heligoland off the west coast of Denmark was occupied in September 1807. This base made it easier for Britain to control trade to North Sea ports and to facilitate smuggling. The attacks against Copenhagen and Heligoland started the Gunboat War against Denmark, which lasted until 1814.

Sweden, Britain's ally in the Third Coalition, refused to comply with French demands and was attacked by Russia in February and by Denmark-Norway in March 1808. At the same time, a French force threatened to invade southern Sweden, but the plan was stopped as the Royal Navy controlled the Danish Straits. The Royal Navy set up a base outside the port of Gothenburg in 1808 to simplify operations into the Baltic Sea. The Baltic campaign was under the command of Vice-admiral James Saumarez. In November 1810 France demanded that Sweden should declare war upon Britain and stop all trade. The result was a phony war between Sweden and Britain. A second navy base was set up on the island of Hanö in the south of Sweden in 1810. These two bases were used to support convoys from Britain to Gothenburg, then through the Danish Straits to Hanö. From Hanö the goods were smuggled to the many ports around the Baltic Sea. To further support the convoys, the small Danish island of Anholt was occupied in May 1809. A lighthouse on the island simplified navigation through the Danish Straits.

Russia also chafed under the embargo, and in 1810 reopened trade with Britain. Russia's withdrawal from the system was a motivating factor behind Napoleon's decision to invade Russia in 1812, which proved the turning point of the war and his regime.

=== Portugal and Spain ===
Portugal openly refused to join the Continental System. In 1793, Portugal signed a treaty of mutual assistance with Britain. After the Treaty of Tilsit in July 1807, Napoleon attempted to capture the Portuguese fleet and the House of Braganza, and to occupy the Portuguese ports. He failed, as Prince Regent John (later King as John VI), acting for his mother, Queen Maria I, took the fleet and transferred the Portuguese court to Brazil with a Royal Navy escort. The Portuguese population rose in revolt against the French invaders, with the help of the British Army under Arthur Wellesley, later the Duke of Wellington. Napoleon intervened, and the Peninsular War began in 1808. Napoleon also forced the Spanish royal family to abdicate their throne in favour of Napoleon's brother, Joseph.

== Legacy ==
The prospect of a potentially second continental league including France, Germany and Russia was briefly proposed in 1900s.

== See also ==
- Economic and logistical aspects of the Napoleonic Wars
