= Charles Meynier =

18th- and 19th-century French painter

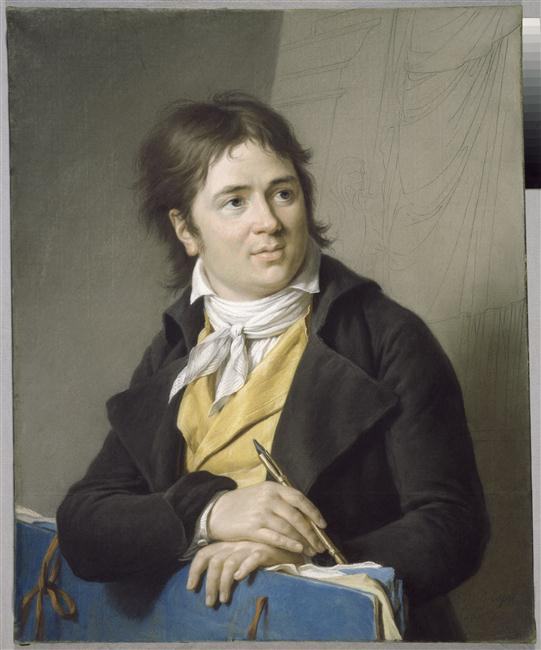
Portrait of Meynier by Marie-Gabrielle Capet, 1799

Charles Meynier (1763 or 1768, Paris – 1832, Paris) was a French painter of historical subjects in the late 18th and early 19th century. He was a contemporary of Antoine-Jean Gros and Jacques-Louis David.

== Biography ==
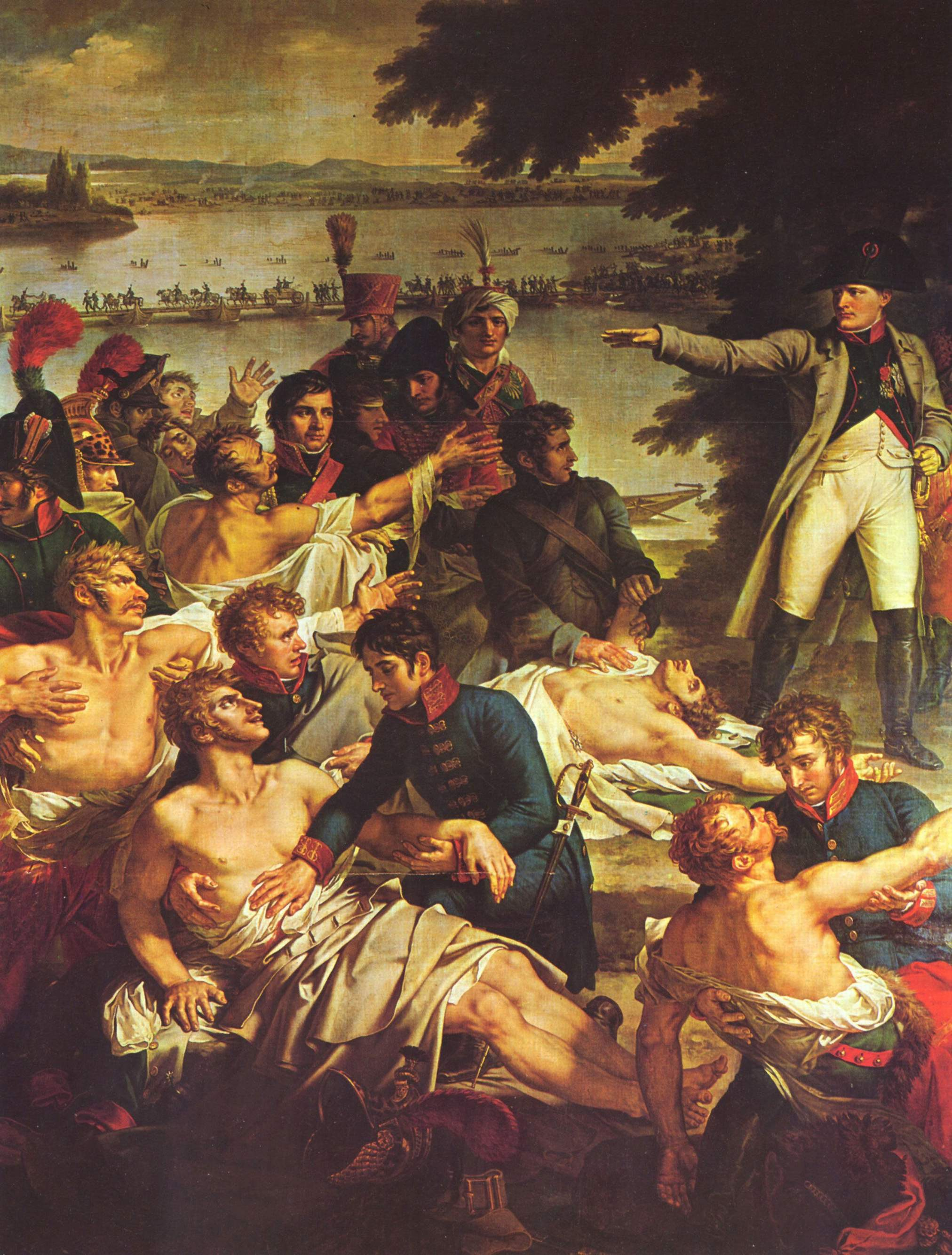
Detail: Napoleon on the Isle of Lobau

Meynier was the son of a tailor. Already at a young age he was trained by Pierre-Philippe Choffard. As a student of François-André Vincent, Meynier won the second prize in the 1789 prix de Rome competition; Girodet won. He became a member of the Académie de France à Rome. In 1793 he went back to Paris.

He made designs for the bas-reliefs and statues on the Arc de Triomphe du Carrousel and the Paris Bourse. From 1816 onward, he was a member of the Académie des Beaux-Arts. In 1819 Meynier was appointed teacher at the École des Beaux-Arts. Like his wife he died of cholera.

== Works ==
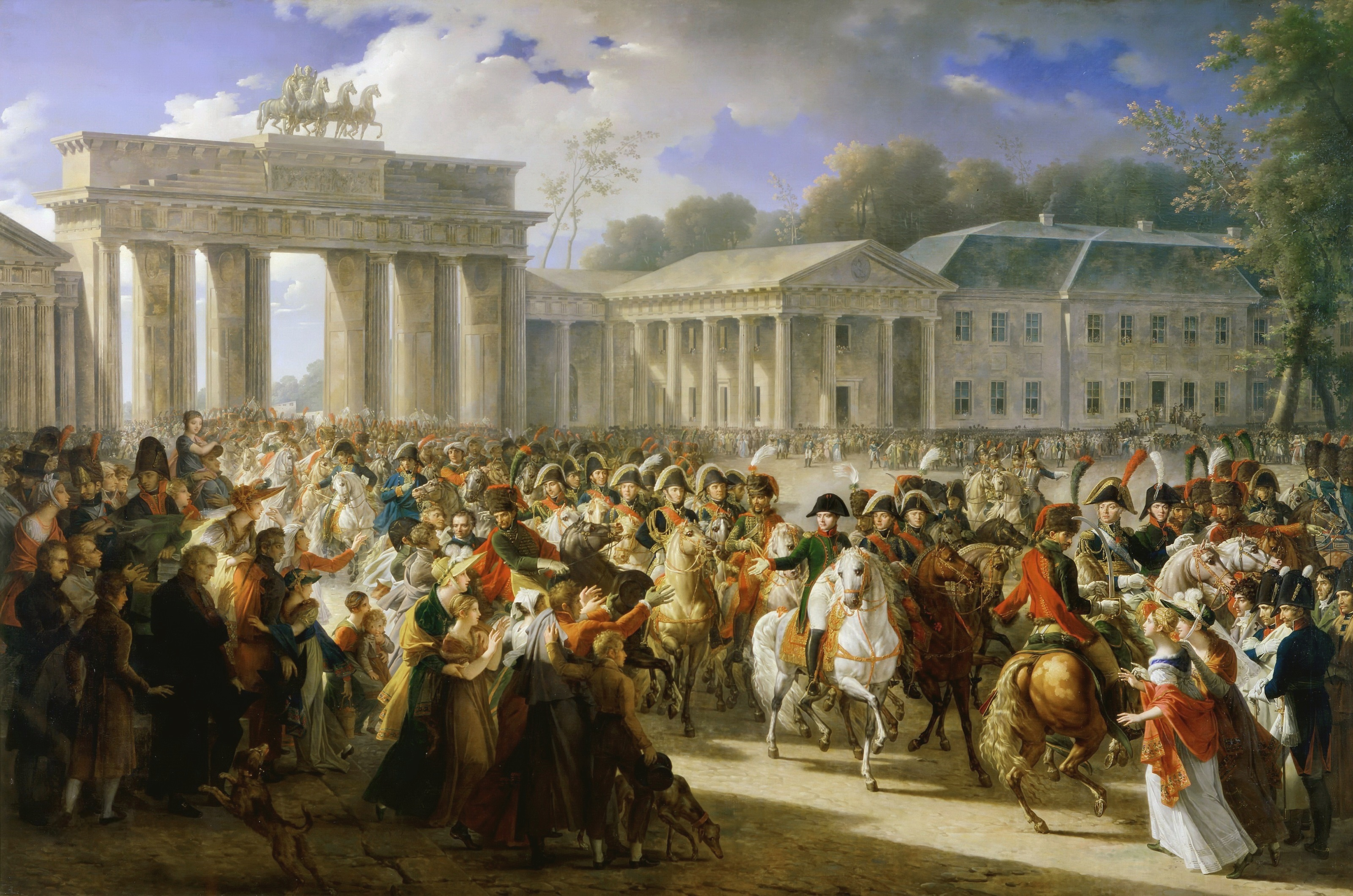
Entry of Napoleon into Berlin. Napoleon passing through the Brandenburg Gate after the Battle of Jena-Auerstedt (1806). Painted by Charles Meynier in 1810.

- "Milo of Croton", 1795 Oil on Canvas Montreal Museum of Fine Arts Montreal, Quebec
- Five canvases of the Muses, commissioned by François Boyer-Fonfrède, but after his bankruptcy they were purchased by General Nicolas Antoine Xavier Castella de Berlens and transferred to his château de Wallenried in Jura, Switzerland, where they remained for roughly 180 years. They were subsequently transferred to the Cleveland Museum of Art, where conservator Dean Yoder dedicated five years to cleaning and in-painting the damaged works. They are currently on public display in Cleveland.
  - Apollo, God of Light, Eloquence, Poetry and the Fine Arts with Urania, Muse of Astronomy, 1798, Cleveland Museum of Art, Cleveland, Ohio
  - Calliope, Muse of Epic Poetry, 1798, Cleveland Museum of Art, Cleveland, Ohio
  - Clio, Muse of History, 1800, Cleveland Museum of Art, Cleveland, Ohio
  - Erato, Muse of Lyrical Poetry, 1800, Cleveland Museum of Art, Cleveland, Ohio
  - Polyhymnia, Muse of Eloquence, 1800, Cleveland Museum of Art, Cleveland, Ohio
- Napoleon in Berlin, 1810, Palace of Versailles
- Wisdom Defending Youth from the Arrows of Love, 1810, National Gallery of Canada

== Gallery ==
Calliope, Muse of Epic Poetry, 1798

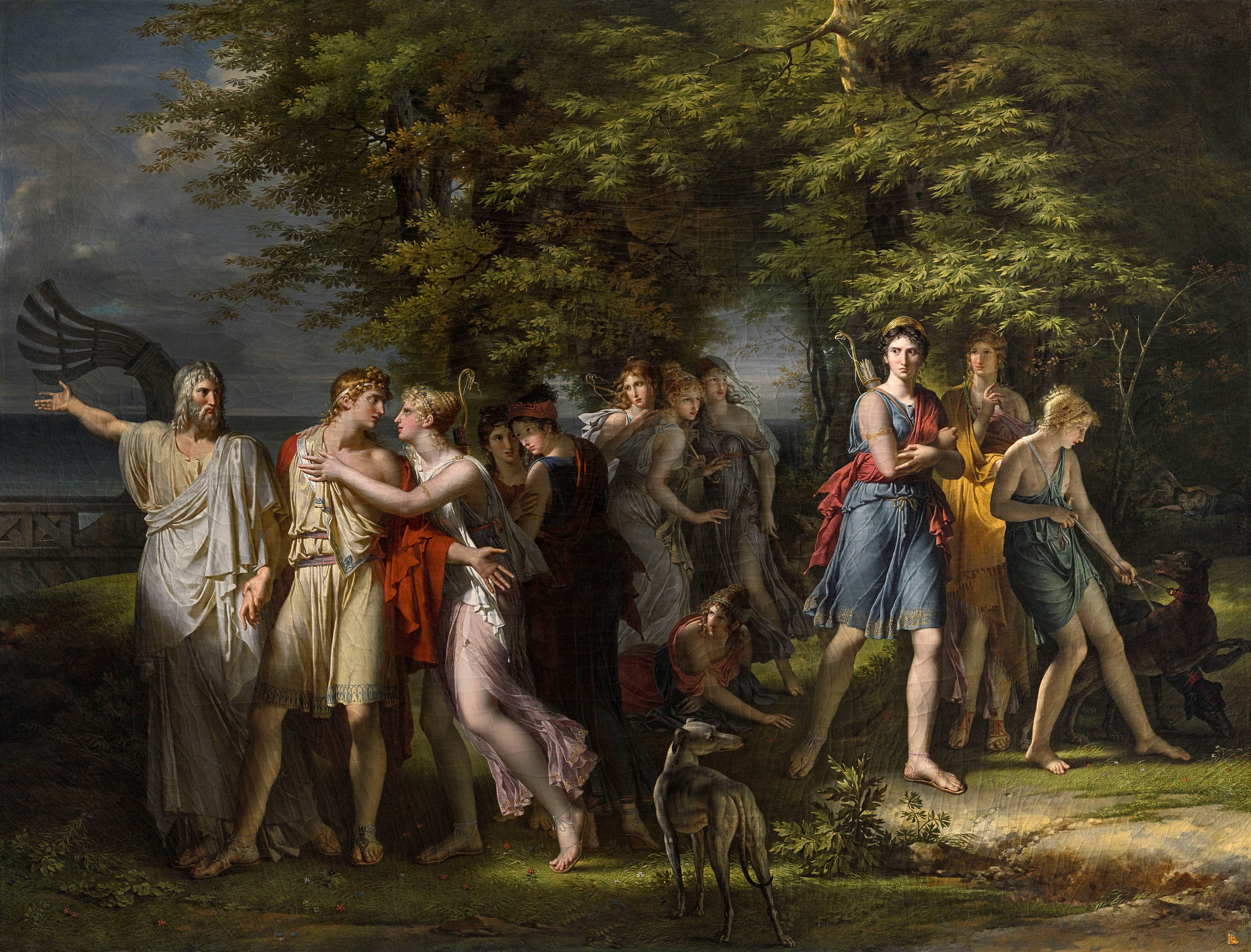
Telemachus, Urged by Mentor, Leaving the Island of Calypso, 1799-1800

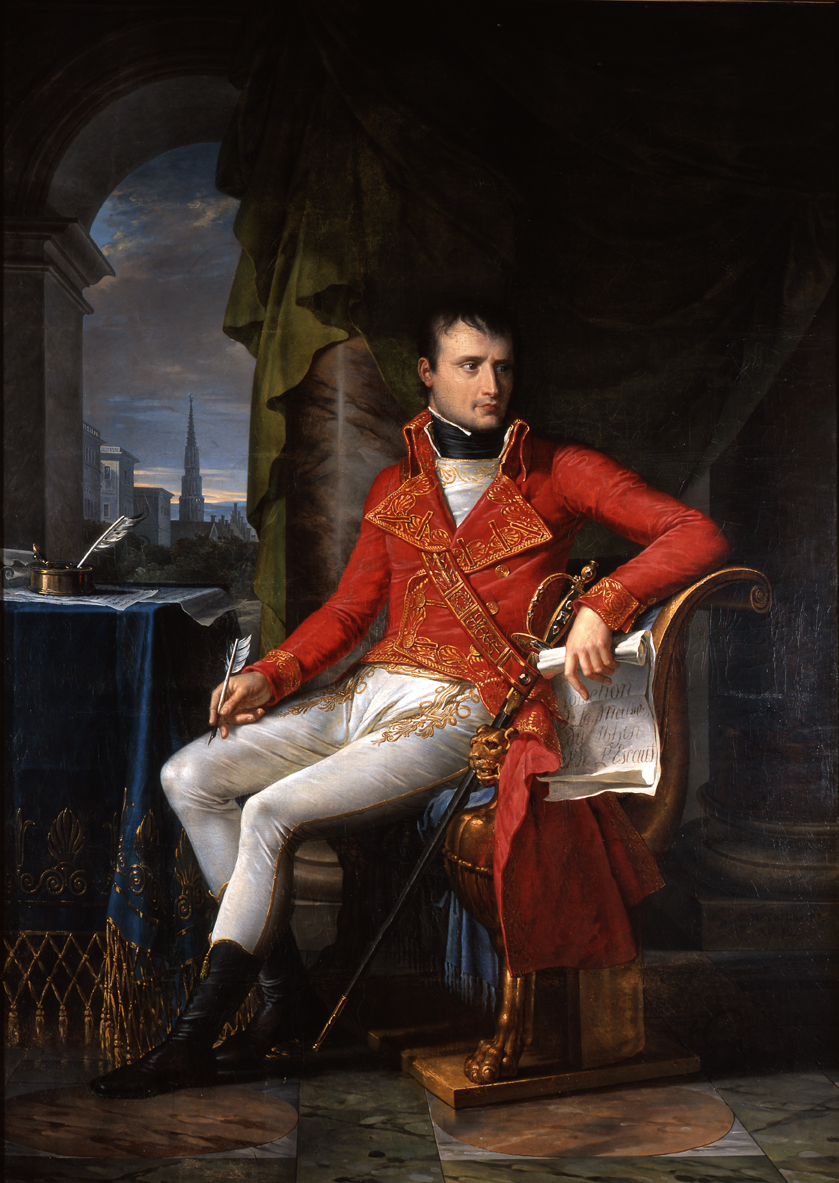
Napoleon as First Consul, 1804

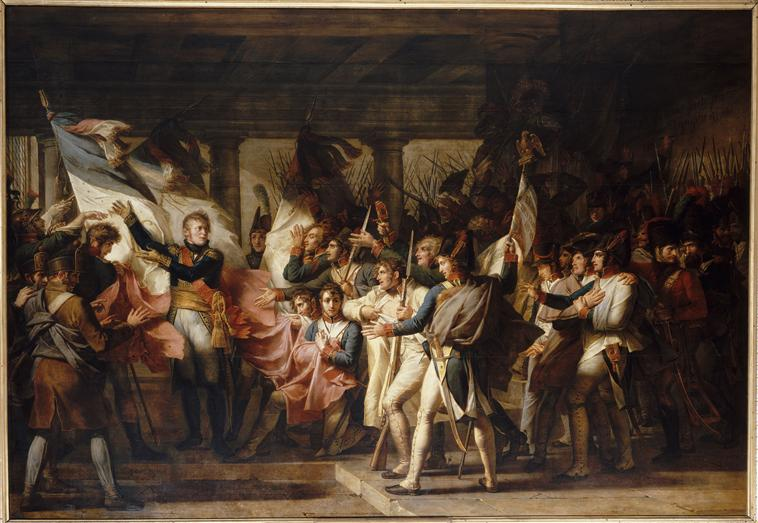
The soldiers of the 76th Ligne receive their banners from Marshal Ney, 1808

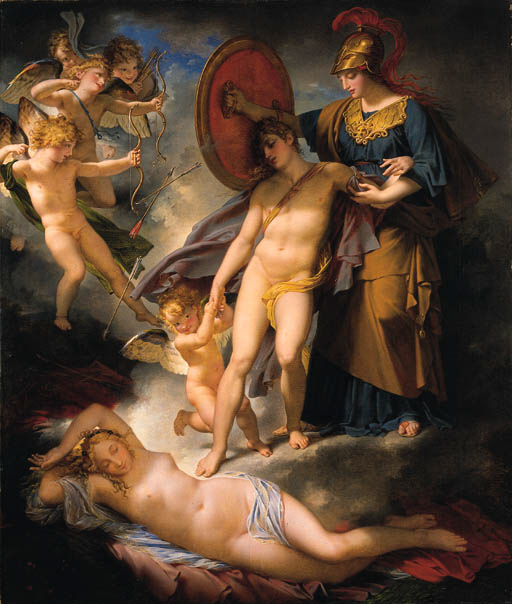
Wisdom Defending Youth Against Love, 1810

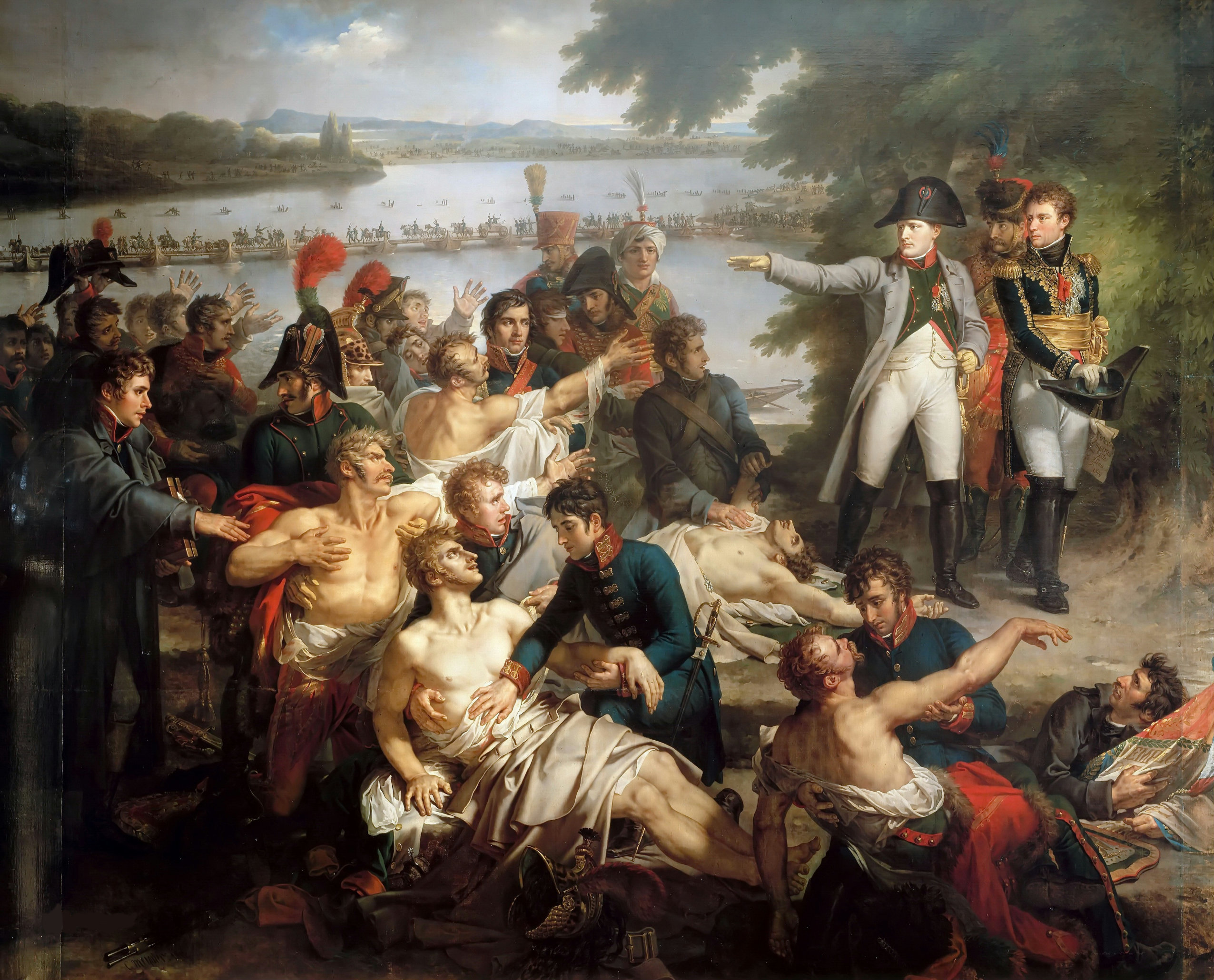
Napoleon's Return to the Island of Lobau After the Battle of Essling, 1812

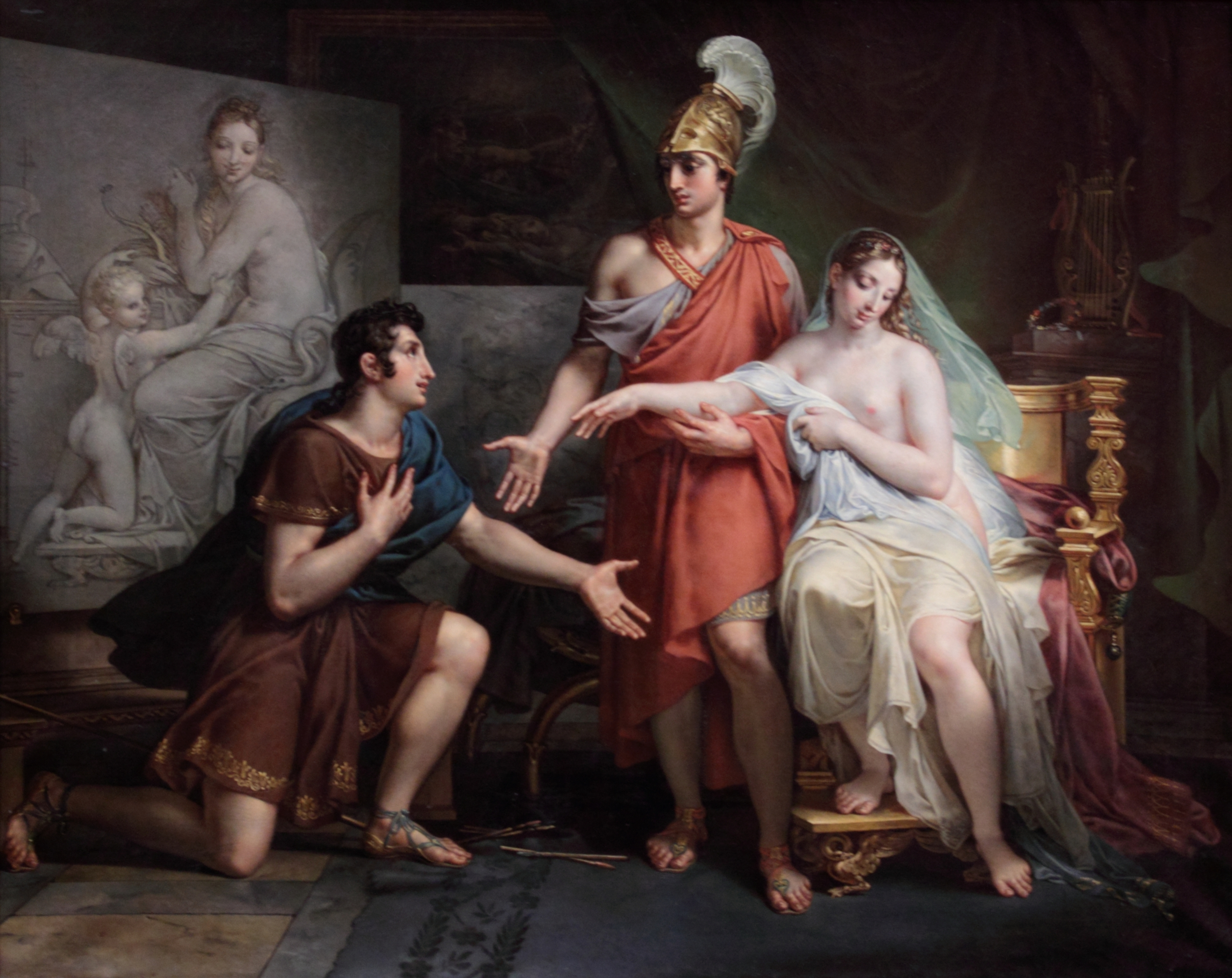
Alexander the Great Giving Campaspe to Apelles, 1822

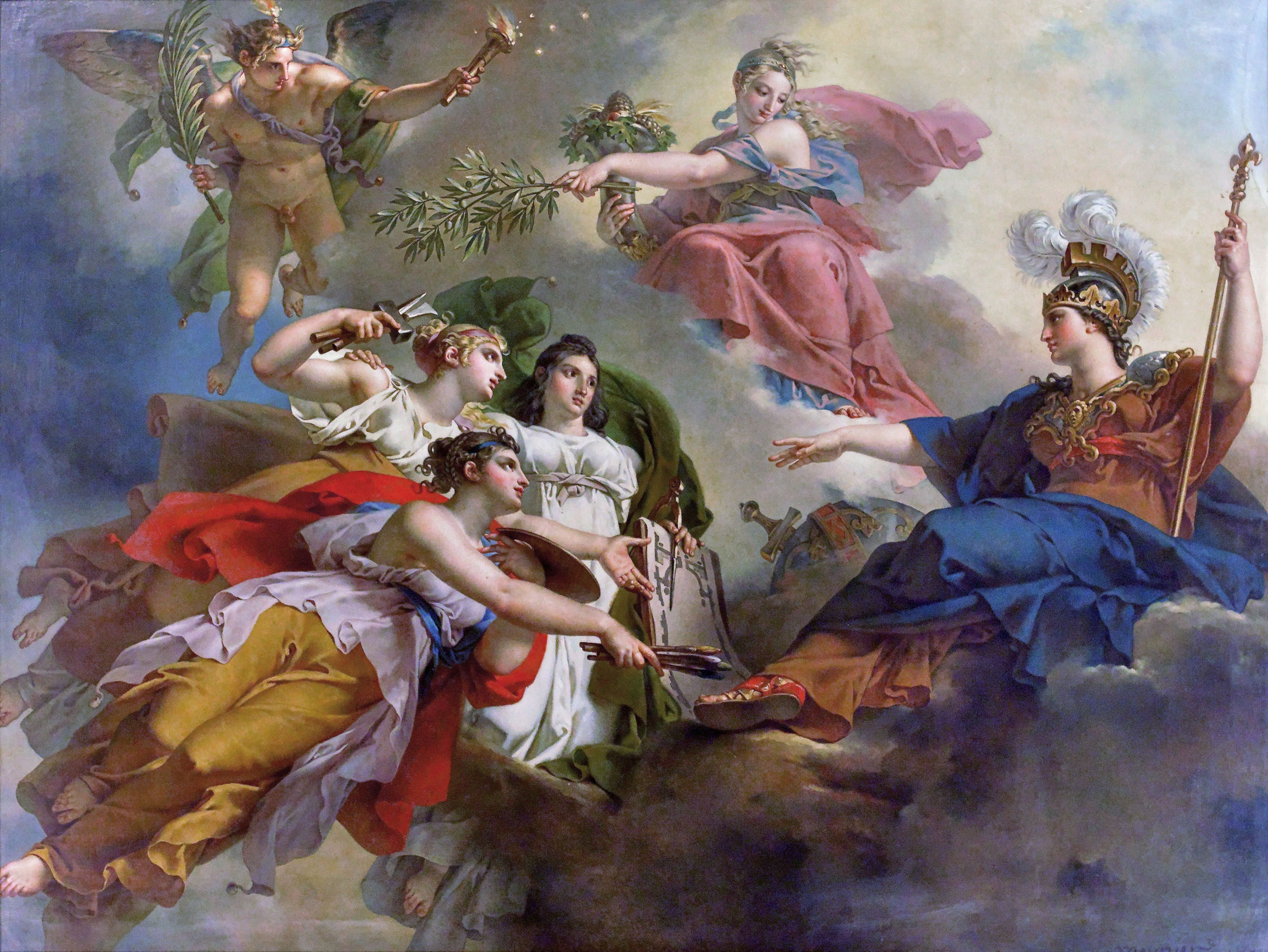
France in the guise of Minerva, 1819

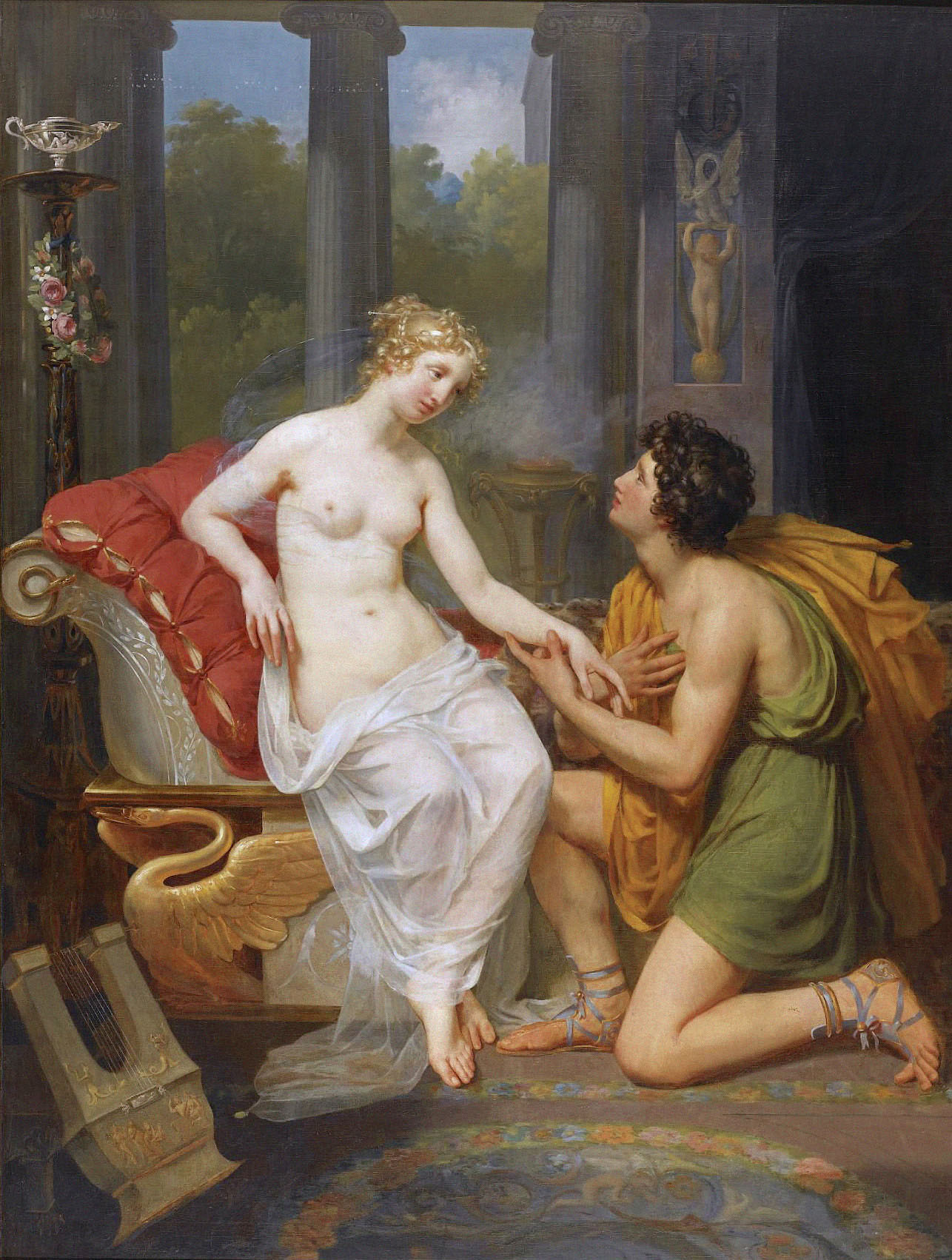
Helen and Paris
