= Sinking of HMS Avon =

Single-ship action in the War of 1812

- Part of the War of 1812
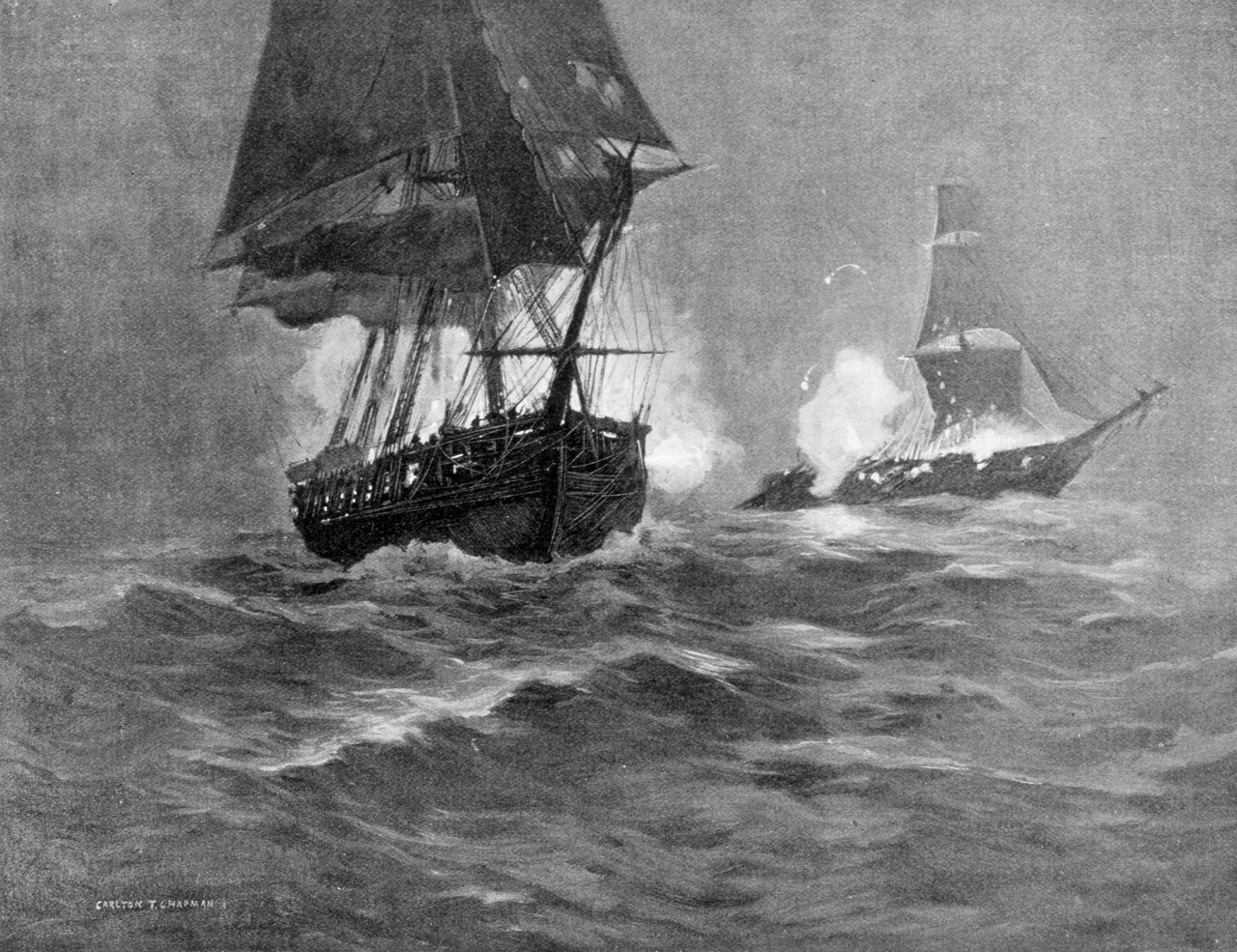
- The Wasp’s Engagement with the Avon on September 1, 1814; Carlton T. Chapman, 1896
Date	1 September 1814
Location	English Channel
Result	American victory

Belligerents
United States	(United Kingdom of Great Britain and Ireland) United Kingdom

Commanders and leaders
Johnston Blakeley	James Arbuthnot (surrendered)

Strength
Sloop-of-war Wasp	Brig-sloop Avon; Brig-sloop Castilian

Casualties and losses
3 wounded	10 killed 29 wounded Avon sunk

The sinking of HMS Avon was a single ship action fought during the War of 1812, and took place on 1 September 1814. In the battle, the ship-rigged sloop of war USS Wasp forced the Cruizer-class brig-sloop HMS Avon to surrender. The Americans could not take possession of the prize as other British brig-sloops appeared and prepared to engage. Avon sank shortly after the battle.

== Prelude ==
The heavy sloop of war USS Wasp had spent seven weeks in Lorient in France, making repairs after an earlier hard-fought action against HMS Reindeer, and replacing casualties from the crews of American privateers in the port. Wasp sortied on 27 August, and almost immediately was involved in action. Early on 1 September, a convoy of ten merchant ships escorted by the ship of the line HMS Armada was encountered. Wasp made repeated attacks and succeeded in capturing one ship loaded with iron, brass and arms.

Later that day, as night was falling, Master Commandant Johnston Blakeley, commanding Wasp, spotted four other unknown sail, and made for the nearest.

== Battle ==
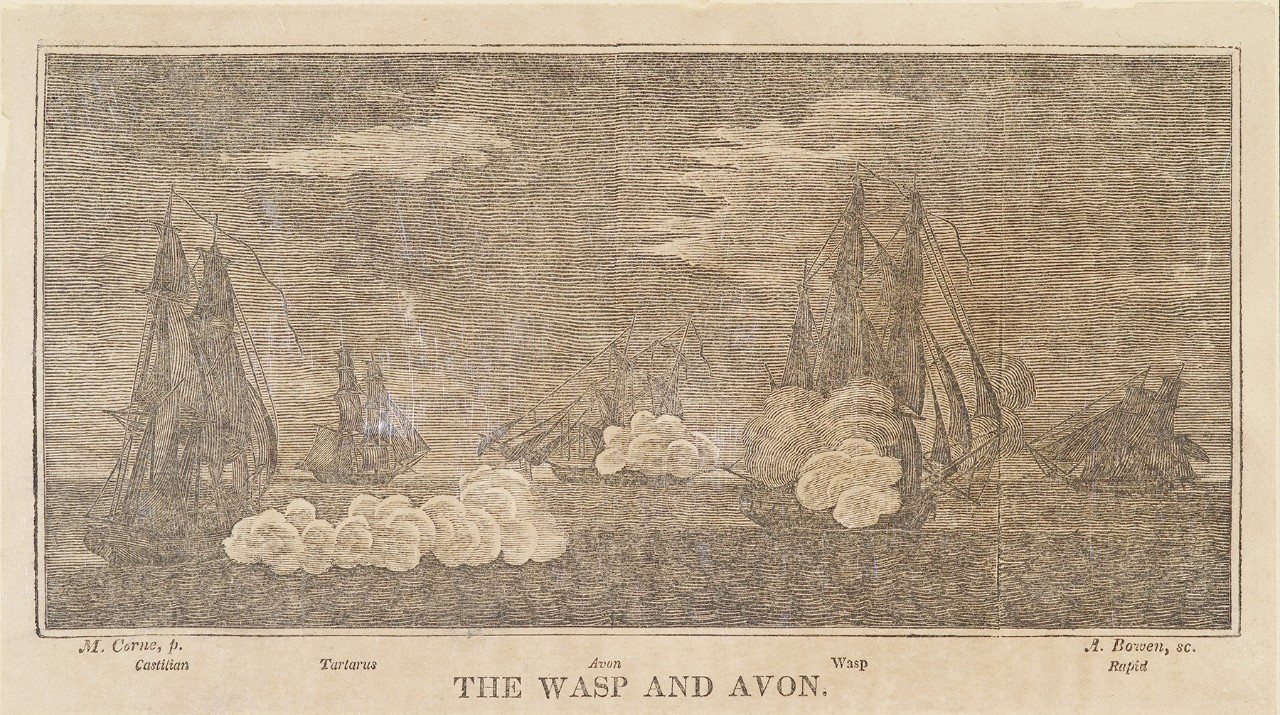
1815 engraving of Avon engaging Wasp by Abel Bowen after a Michele Felice Cornè painting

The unknown vessel was the Cruizer-class brig-sloop HMS Avon, mounting sixteen 32-pounder carronades and two 6-pounder long guns. Wasp carried twenty-two 32-pounder carronades, two 12-pounder chase guns and a 12-pounder boat carronade removed from Reindeer. As Wasp approached Avon's quarter, the two vessels exchanged several hails, in which the Americans demanded that the British vessel heave to, and also exchanged shots from their bow and stern chase guns. Blakeley eventually drew up alongside Avon, deliberately selecting the leeward position to prevent Avon escaping downwind.

It was fully dark by this time, the wind was fresh and the sea was fairly rough. Nevertheless, the American gunners were very accurate. After half an hour, Avon had been partly dismasted, one third of her crew were casualties and her guns had been silenced, many of the broadside carronades being dismounted. By contrast, although the battle took place at such short range that one American sailor was struck by wadding from a British carronade, only four shot struck the hull of Wasp and only three American sailors were wounded.

Three quarters of an hour after the start of the battle, Avon surrendered. While the crew of Wasp were lowering a boat to take possession, another unknown vessel was seen approaching, followed by two more. Wasp made away downwind while the braces which had been shot away were replaced. The nearest pursuer was the British brig-sloop HMS Castilian. The brig got close enough to fire an inaccurate broadside over Wasp's quarter, but Avon had been making repeated distress signals, and Castilian broke off to help. Avon's crew was taken off, and the shattered brig sank soon afterwards.

== Aftermath ==
Wasp continued to cruise west of the mouth of the English Channel. On 21 September, it met with a neutral Swedish merchant vessel, on board of which were two officers from the frigate USS Essex, which had been captured the previous year off the coast of Chile. Some of the officers from the prizes taken earlier by Wasp were put aboard the Swedish ship. After the two vessels parted, Wasp vanished, and was presumed lost to bad weather south of the Azores.

The released prisoners brought news of the one-sided nature of the action between Wasp and Avon to Britain. This caused calls to be made for larger, better-armed sloops and brigs to be built, without taking into consideration the far more effective American gunnery.
