= USS Blakely =

USS Blakely may refer to the following ships of the United States Navy:

- USS Blakely (TB-27), a torpedo boat commissioned in 1904 was named for Capt. Johnston Blakeley. The name was canceled in 1918 so that it could instead be assigned to Blakeley (DD-150).
- USS Blakeley (DD-150), a Wickes-class destroyer was named for Capt. Johnston Blakeley.
- USS Blakely (FF-1072) (originally DE-1072), a Knox-class frigate was named for Captain Johnston Blakeley and Charles Adams Blakely.

== See also ==
- USS J. R. Y. Blakely (DE-140)
