= Sinking of HMS Reindeer =

Naval action of the War of 1812

- Part of the War of 1812
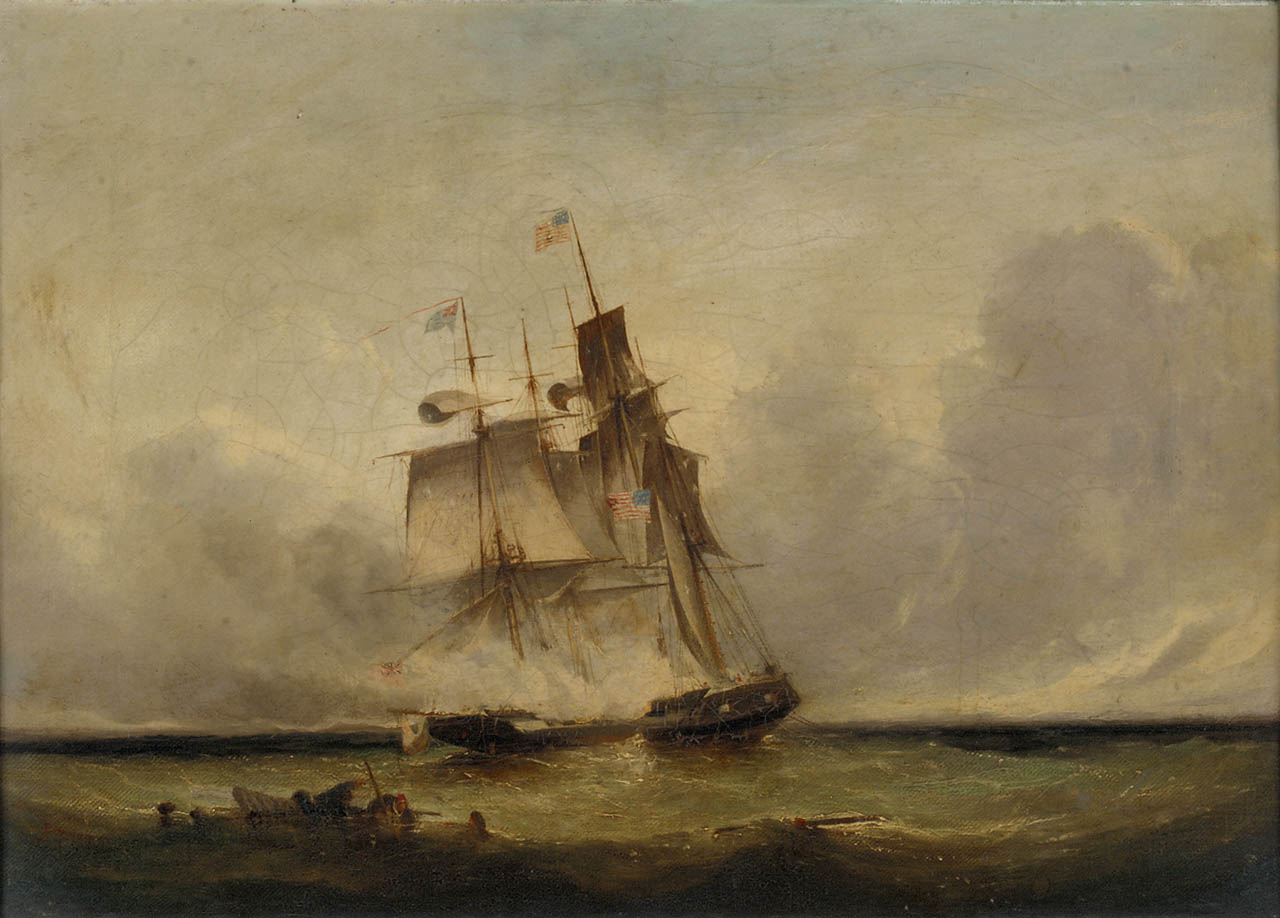
- Action between USS 'Wasp' and HMS 'Reindeer', 28 June 1814; Edwin Hayes
Date	28 June 1814
Location	English Channel
Result	American victory

Belligerents
United States	(United Kingdom of Great Britain and Ireland) United Kingdom

Commanders and leaders
Johnston Blakeley	William Manners †

Strength
Sloop-of-war Wasp	Brig-sloop Reindeer

Casualties and losses
9 killed 15 wounded	25 killed 42 wounded Reindeer captured

The sinking of HMS Reindeer was a naval action of the War of 1812 which took place on 28 June 1814. The ship-rigged sloop of war USS Wasp forced the Cruizer-class brig-sloop HMS Reindeer to strike her colours after far more than half the brig's crew, including her captain, Commander William Manners, were killed or wounded. Reindeer was too badly damaged in the action to be salvaged so the Americans burnt her.

== Background ==
USS Wasp was one of a class of three heavy sloops of war designed by William Doughty. The sloop was commissioned in Portsmouth, New Hampshire, and sortied on 1 May 1814. The commander was Master Commandant Johnston Blakeley, and the crew consisted of 173 hand-picked New Englanders. Blakeley's orders were to raid British commerce in the mouth of the English Channel, following in the brief successes of USS Argus in 1813. Over several weeks, Blakeley captured seven merchant vessels. At daybreak on 28 June, while Wasp was chasing two more merchantmen, the brig-sloop HMS Reindeer was seen bearing down from the windward. Reindeer had sailed from Plymouth a few days earlier with orders to hunt down Wasp.

== Battle ==
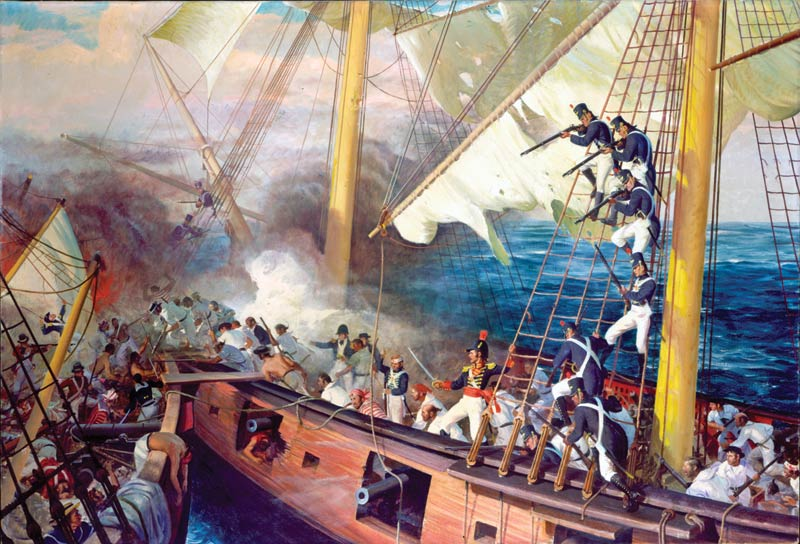
1945 painting of Wasp's crew boarding Reindeer by John Clymer

Wasp was the heavier of the two vessels, mounting twenty-two 32-pounder carronades and two 12-pounder chase guns. Reindeer carried only eighteen 24-pounder carronades, although 32-pounders were the standard armament for brigs of the Cruizer class to which Reindeer belonged. Reindeer also mounted two 6-pounder bow chase guns, but the brig's boat carried a 12-pounder carronade, which, her captain, Commander William Manners was to use effectively. Although the sky was overcast, the wind was very light and more than half the day was gone before the two vessels were within range. As both vessels shortened sail, Reindeer was within 60 yards (55 m) of Wasp's quarter, where neither vessel could bring its broadside to bear. Over ten minutes, Reindeer fired five deliberate shots from her shifting boat carronade from this position. Eventually, Blakeley turned downwind to bring his broadside to bear, and the two vessels exchanged broadsides while almost dead in the water.

After twenty minutes' firing, the two vessels came into contact, and some of the crew of Reindeer tried to board Wasp but were beaten back. Manners was mortally wounded but continued to urge on his crew until killed by a musket shot from Wasp's rigging. American boarding parties swarmed aboard Reindeer. Once they had driven Reindeer's remaining crew below, Manner's clerk, the only British serviceman of significant rank who was not killed or injured, surrendered. Reindeer had suffered 25 killed, including Manners, and 42 wounded out of a total complement of 98 men and 20 boys. Out of 173 men and two boys in her complement, Wasp had two midshipman and nine seamen and marines killed and mortally wounded, and fifteen petty officers, seamen, and marines wounded severely and slightly.

== Aftermath ==
The American victory could be ascribed almost entirely to superior weight of armament and numbers of crew. The casualties inflicted on both sides were almost in proportion to the odds. Reindeer had been reduced to a wreck, and Blakeley set it on fire before putting some of the wounded prisoners aboard a neutral ship and proceeding into Lorient. Following the Bourbon Restoration in France, the French remained officially neutral in the War of 1812, although their sympathies were decidedly with the Americans. Blakeley was forced to remain for seven weeks while making repairs, chiefly to the damaged masts, but British diplomatic protests that this violated French neutrality were ignored. When Wasp emerged from Lorient, she won further victories in the Channel before vanishing in the South Atlantic, most likely falling victim to bad weather.
