= HMS Reindeer (1804) =

Brig-sloop of the Royal Navy

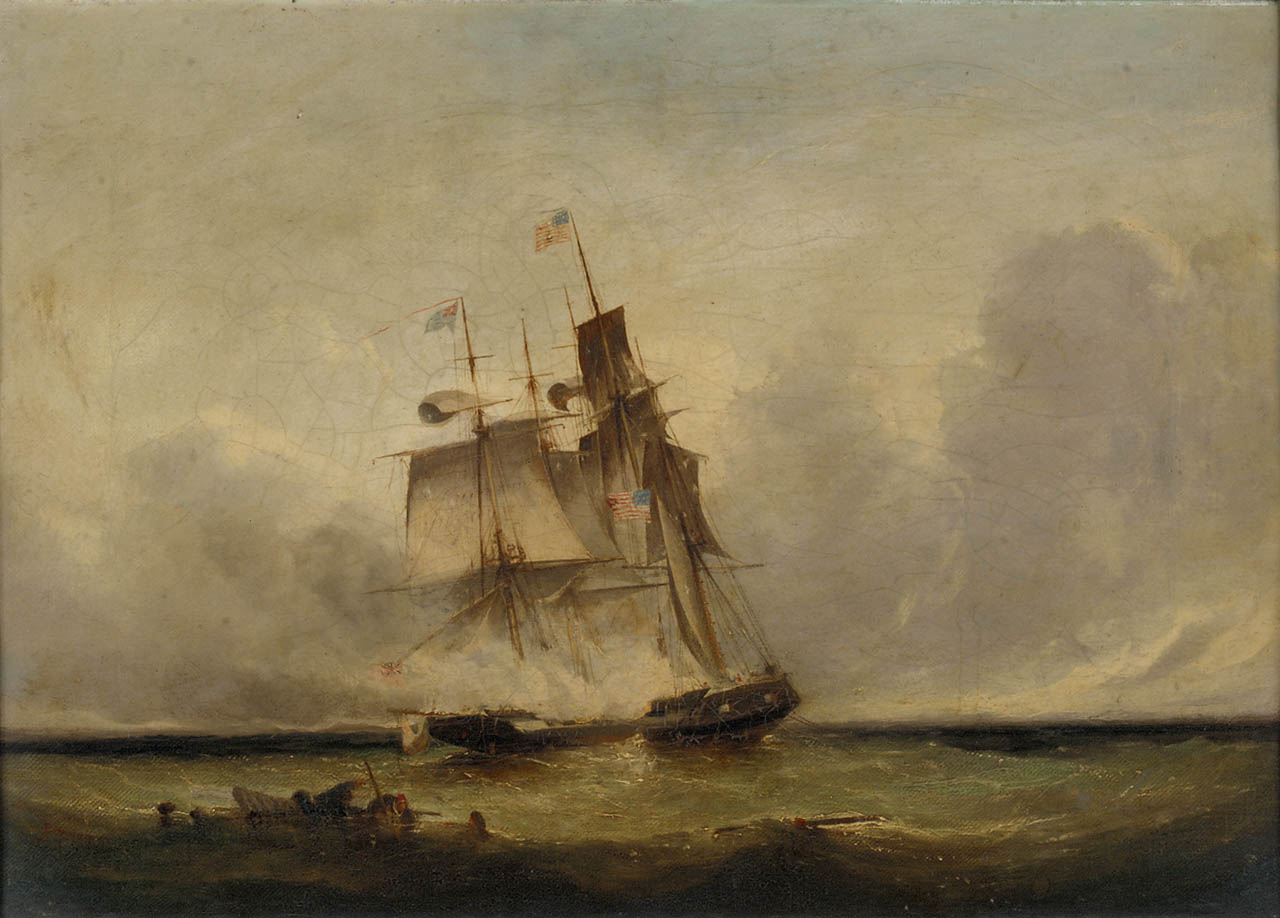
- Painting of USS Wasp capturing Reindeer (left) by Edwin Hayes

History

United Kingdom
- Name: HMS Reindeer
- Ordered: 23 May 1804
- Builder: S(amuel) & D(aniel) Brent, Rotherhithe
- Laid down: June 1804
- Launched: 15 August 1804
- Commissioned: September 1804
- Fate: Captured and burnt by USS Wasp on 28 June 1814

General characteristics
- Class & type: Cruizer-class brig-sloop
- Tons burthen: 385 bm
- Length: 100 ft 0 in (30.48 m)
- Beam: 30 ft 7 1/2 in (9.335 m)
- Draught: 5 ft 3 in (1.60 m) forward; 10 ft 6 in (3.20 m)aft
- Depth of hold: 12 ft 10 in (3.91 m)
- Propulsion: Sails
- Sail plan: two-masted brig-sloop
- Armament: Originally: 16 × 32-pounder carronades + 2 × 6-pounder bow-chasers; Later: 16 × 24-pounder carronades + 2 × 6-pounder guns + 1 × 12-pounder carronade boat gun

HMS Reindeer was an 18-gun Cruizer-class brig-sloop of the Royal Navy, built by Samuel & Daniel Brent at Rotherhithe and was launched in 1804. She was built of fir, which made for more rapid construction at the expense of durability. Reindeer fought in the Napoleonic Wars before succumbing in 1814 to the guns of USS Wasp during the War of 1812.

== Caribbean ==
In September 1804 Commander John Fyffe commissioned Reindeer and on 21 November sailed for the Jamaica station, of which Rear-Admiral Dacres was the C-in-C. On 7 March 1805 she and Hunter captured the Spanish privateer schooner Santa Rosalía Golondrina after a chase of over five hours. During the chase the Spaniard threw her three guns − one 8-pounder and two 4-pounders - overboard. She was under the command of Francisco de Naras and had a crew of 57 men. The privateer had left Caliodam in Cuba the previous day for a fourteen-day cruise but had taken no prizes. Fyffe sent her in to Port Royal with Hunter.

Then, on 13 September Reindeer captured the French privateer Renommée, of two 6-pounder guns. Reindeer's crew had had to labour at the sweeps for some six hours under a hot sun before they were able to reach their quarry. Renommée had a crew of 40 men and was most recently out of Baracoa. On this cruise she had taken no prizes.

Early in March 1805, Reindeer and Magicienne sent two boats each, under the command of Lieutenant John Kelly Tudor of Reindeer, to cut out a 4-gun schooner from under a battery in Aguadilla Bay, Puerto Rico. (Note: For more on John Kelly Tudor see: O'Byrne, William R. (1849). "Tudor, John Kelly" . A Naval Biographical Dictionary. London: John Murray.)

On 24 March 1806, off Puerto Rico, Reindeer encountered two French brigs, Phaéton and Voltigeur, each of sixteen 6-pounder guns. The vessels exchanged fire for some four hours. Reindeer succeeded in damaging the French brigs before they escaped; Reindeer too had some damage but no casualties. Two days later Pique captured the two French brigs. Phaéton, under the command of Lieutenant de vaisseau Saulces de Freycinet, was sailing to the Antilles when she was captured near Santo Domingo. The Admiralty took Phaeton into British service as Mignonne and Voltigeur as Pelican.

Then on 21 April, off Cape St. Nicholas in San Domingo, Reindeer captured the French privateer schooner Creole. She was pierced for 14 guns but only mounted six, not including swivel guns. She had a crew of 59 and had put another 16 men on prizes. Creole had a reputation for being the fastest vessel in those waters; Fyffe believed that he would not have caught her if Creole's captain had not been so confident that he could outrun Reindeer that he tried to cut in front of her bow to gain the wind. Reindeer also destroyed another small privateer of two guns. The crew, however, escaped.

In January 1807 Reindeer shared, with Latona, Fisgard and Morne Fortunee in the proceeds of a number of captures. On 18 January they captured Santa Cecilia. Two days later they captured the schooner Mary. Then on 4 February they captured Friends. Later that February Commander Peter John Douglas replaced Fyffe in command of Reindeer.

On 13 October as Reindeer was chasing a suspicious schooner when Bacchante came up and cut the quarry off, which then struck. The vessel turned out to be Amor de la Patria, under Captain Josse de Tournecy. She was armed with three guns and had a crew of 63 men. She was five days out of St. Jago (Santiago de Cuba) but had not taken any prizes.

On 21 December, after a 10-hour chase, Reindeer captured the French schooner privateer Experiment, under Captain Antoine Corocco, off Tiberon in the extreme south-west of Haiti. She was armed with two guns and carrying 40 men and had made no captures in the three weeks since she had left Baracoa in Cuba. Then on 25 January 1808, off Point Picolet in San Domingo, Reindeer chased and captured the French privateer schooner Lyonnaise, under Captain Jean Tessier. Lyonnaise was pierced for 12 guns but only mounted five; she had a crew of 85 men and was eight days out of Baracoa. Two days later, Douglas, learning of a privateer rendezvous, managed to run one of them ashore where her crew abandoned her. Reindeer brought the 3-gun vessel off the shore without much trouble. Douglas then sailed for Port Royal with her. As he had 90 prisoners on board and 30 men away in prizes Douglas apparently feared an uprising.

On 10 November 1808, Reindeer, Franchise, Aurora, Daedalus, and Pert met by chance. The captains got together and decided to capture the town and port of Samana in order to assist the Spanish patriots that had established a blockade of San Domingo. The town was also the last port of refuge for privateers to the windward of San Domingo and the enemy were in the act of erecting batteries for its protection. The British entered the following day and took possession of the harbour. Captain Charles Dashwood of Franchise handed Samana over to a Spanish officer, Don Diego de Lira, who guaranteed the safety of the French inhabitants on their plantations.

During the following week the British captured two French 5-gun privateer schooners. One was Guerrière, Louis Telin, master, with a crew of 110 men; the other was Exchange with a crew of 104. The British also took three merchant vessels, the schooner Diana and a brig, both laden with fish, and the sloop Brutus, laden with coffee.

On 1 November His Majesty's schooner Firefly escorted two schooners that Reindeer had cut out of a port at San Domingo.

On the morning of 16 November Reindeer and Pert re-captured the English ship Jeannet, R. Bradshaw, master, of 10 guns and 185 tons (bm). She had been bound from London to Havana with bale goods and was running for Samana harbour with a prize crew after being taken by a privateer. The two British sloops also captured another prize, the 350 ton (bm) Spanish ship St. Erasmo, A. Gerona, master, sailing from Malaga to Havana with wine and bale goods.

In 1809 Reindeer was in the North Sea. On 8 March she captured the French naval 1-gun schooner-aviso Mouche №13. Mouche №13 was under the command of enseigne de vaisseau Detcheverry and was carrying dispatches from Brest to San Domingo when Reindeer captured her west of the Azores. Then on 4 November Reindeer sailed for Jamaica again under Commander Christopher Crackenthorp Askew.

== Channel ==
In 1811 Reindeer came under the command of Commander Nicholas Lechmere Pateshall. In August she was in Plymouth, where Commander Daniel Ross took command. His successor, in 1813, was Commander William Manners.

During 1813 Reindeer captured several vessels, including some privateers. On 2 February Reindeer and Iris captured the Baltimore letter of marque schooner Cashier, which was armed with two 12-pounder guns and four 12-pounder carronades, and under the command of Captain George Wilson. The capture followed a chase during which the American vessel lost one man killed and several wounded out of her crew of 40.

Then on 19 March Reindeer captured the French brig Pandour. Next, on 6 April, Reindeer was in company with Helicon when they captured the American private schooner of war Shadow. On 15 July Reindeer was in company with Whiting when Whiting recaptured Friends. On 22 November, Reindeer captured the French 14-gun privateer lugger Spéculation. She was five days out of St Malo but had taken nothing. Lastly, Reindeer shared in the prize money arising from her sister ship Derwent's recapture of Racehorse on 13 December.

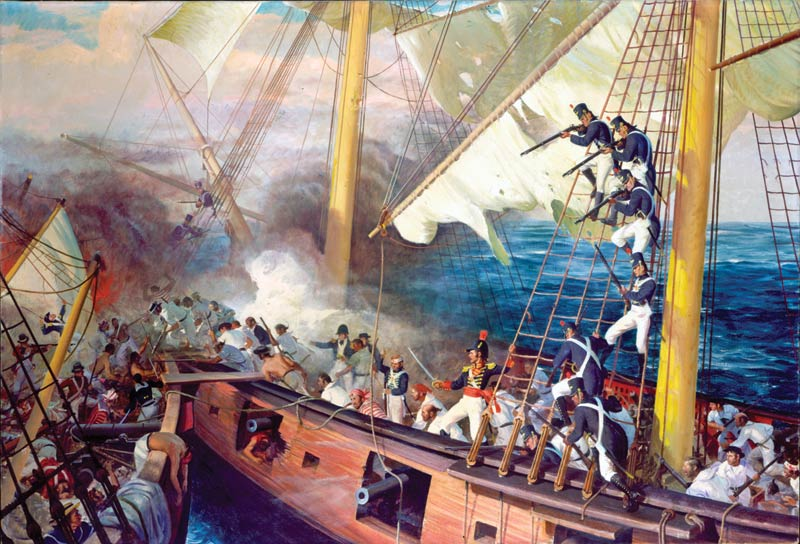
1945 painting of Wasp's crew boarding Reindeer by John Clymer

On 28 June 1814 Reindeer encountered the American sloop Wasp, under the command of Johnston Blakely about 500 miles west of Ushant. In the resulting action Reindeer suffered 25 killed, including her commander, and 42 men wounded, out of a total of 98 men and 20 boys, and she was forced to surrender. Key factors in the fight were that Wasp's crew greatly outnumbered Reindeer's, and Wasp's broadside was much heavier than Reindeer's. At the time of the battle, Reindeer had 24-pounder carronades instead of her original 32-pounder carronades because of her age and weakness.

== Fate ==
The following day, on 29 June 1814, Blakely decided Reindeer was too badly damaged and set fire to her.
