= John H. Hoover =

American four star Admiral

John Howard Hoover
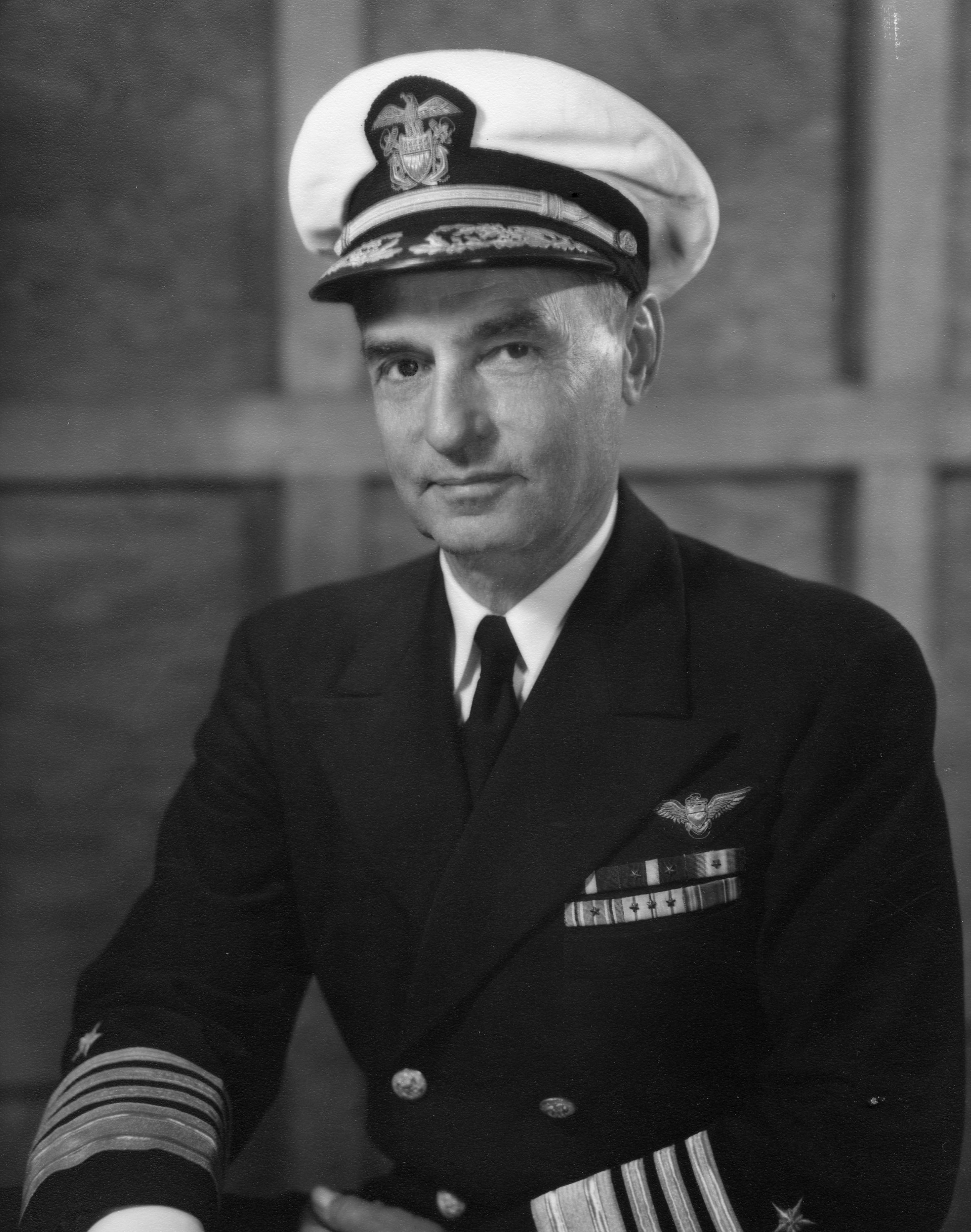
- Born: May 15, 1887; Seville, Ohio, US
- Died: December 2, 1970 (aged 83); Washington, D.C., US
- Military career
- Allegiance: United States
- Branch: United States Navy
- Service years: 1903–1948
- Rank: Admiral
- Nicknames: "Johnny", "Genial John"
- Commands: Forward Area Central Pacific; Carrier Division 4 Task Force 57 Pacific Feet; Marianas Pacific; Caribbean Sea Frontier; Tenth Naval District
- Conflicts: World War I World War II: Operation Neuland; Battle of Tarawa; Battle of Kwajalein; Battle of Eniwetok; Battle of Saipan; Battle of Guam; Battle of Peleliu; Battle of Iwo Jima
- Awards: Navy Cross; Distinguished Service Medal (3)

1945 interview
As Forward Area Commander, VADM Hoover discusses progress of the Iwo Jima invasion.

John Howard Hoover (May 15, 1887 – December 2, 1970) was a United States Navy admiral who held several flag commands during World War II most notably those in the Central Pacific under Chester W. Nimitz. Hoover became one of Nimitz's trusted if little known admirals of the Pacific war.

Vice Admiral Hoover served as Commander, Forward Area, Pacific Ocean Areas, during the buildup of Boeing B-29 Superfortress heavy bomber units in 1944–45 in the Mariana Islands.

== Early career ==
John H. Hoover was born on May 15, 1887, in Seville, Ohio as the son of Benjamin Franklin Hoover and Claudia Irene (Crawford) Brown. He grew up in Adel, Montana and following the graduation from the high school in summer 1903, he received an appointment to the United States Naval Academy at Annapolis, Maryland. While at the academy, he was nicknamed "Johnny" and was active in Coxswain team.

Hoover was in the same class as future admirals Augustin T. Beauregard, Patrick N. L. Bellinger, Harold M. Bemis, Richard S. Edwards, Robert C. Giffen, Felix Gygax, Henry K. Hewitt, Jonas H. Ingram, Randall Jacobs, Claud A. Jones, Ernest D. McWhorter, Albert C. Read, and Robert A. Theobald.

Upon graduation with Bachelor of Science degree on June 6, 1907, he was attached as passed midshipman to the protected cruiser USS Chicago and later was transferred to the light cruiser USS Chester, operating along the East Coast of the United States. While aboard that vessel, Hoover was appointed a commission to the rank of ensign on September 13, 1908.

He was transferred to the newly commissioned destroyer USS Paulding in September 1910 and served as her executive and engineer officer during the patrol cruises with the Atlantic Fleet until he was transferred to the battleship USS North Dakota. Hoover was promoted to lieutenant (junior grade) on September 13, 1911.

In April 1913, he was ordered to for duty in connection with fitting out of the destroyer USS Aylwin. Hoover participated in the cruise to Cuba and undertook aviation instruction at U.S. Aviation Camp at Guantanamo Bay. He then returned to Aylwin and took part in the exercise off the North Carolina coast. During the latter operation, the ship's boiler exploded and fire forced the crew to abandoned the ship. He was then transferred to the armored cruiser USS Tennessee and served with the Atlantic Fleet until August 1915, when was ordered to Washington Navy Yard. Hoover was promoted to lieutenant on March 22, 1915.

== World War I ==
Following the United States entry into World War I, Hoover was promoted to the temporary rank of lieutenant commander on August 31, 1917, and had duty at the Naval Gun Factory at Washington Navy Yard until early 1918.

Hoover assumed command of destroyer USS Cushing in July 1918. He commanded that vessel during the antisubmarine patrols off the coast of Brest, France and performed rescue work on the ships that were victims of U-boats.

He operated in the French waters until the Armistice and participated in the escorting and protecting vitally important convoys of troops and supplies through these waters. For his service during the War, Hoover was decorated with an award of the Navy Cross, the second-highest decoration awarded for valor in combat. Hoover was promoted to the temporary rank of commander on September 21, 1918.

== Interwar period ==
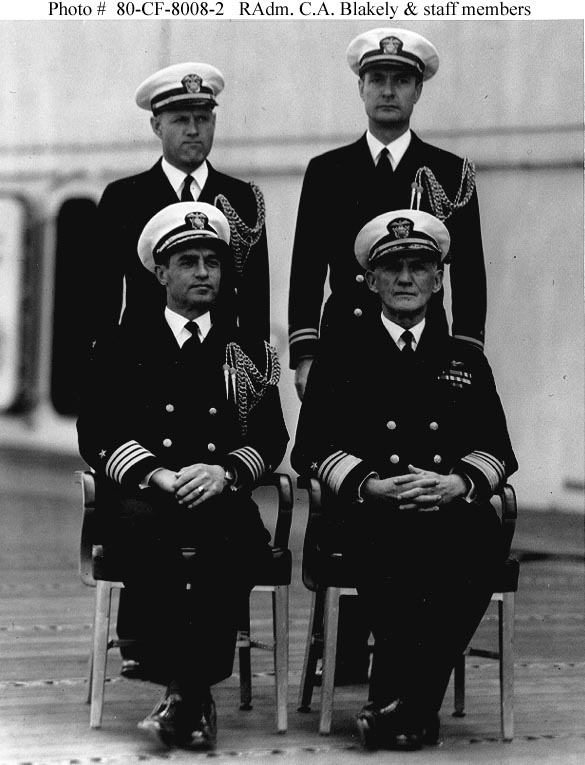
Hoover (seated left) as Chief of Staff to Vice Admiral Charles A. Blakely in March 1940.

Hoover returned to the United States in January 1919 and was detached from the command of Cushing two months later. He then commanded for brief period a destroyer USS Hogan and also served aboard armored cruiser USS Brooklyn and was reverted to the permanent rank of lieutenant commander on July 1, 1919, due to postwar demobilization of the Navy.

He was ordered to the Washington Navy Yard in summer 1922 and was promoted to the permanent rank of commander on June 3, 1922. Hoover was appointed Commander, Submarine Division 8 in November 1923 and participated in the patrols with the Atlantic Fleet until March 1924, when he assumed command of Submarine Division 19.

In June 1926, Hoover was ordered back to Washington, D.C. and joined the Office of the Chief of Naval Operations as aide to Assistant Chief of Naval Operations, Rear Admiral Thomas J. Senn. His work was later praised by Senn, and Hoover requested to be assigned to flight training. He left Washington in August 1928 and entered the instruction at Naval Air Station Pensacola, Florida one month later.

Following the completion of the flight training, Hoover was designated Naval Aviator in January 1929 and remained at headquarters of Pensacola Air Station until June that year, when he joined aircraft carrier USS Lexington. He served as executive officer under then-Captain Ernest J. King and participated in the defense of the west coast of Panama against a hypothetical invader during Fleet Problem XII in February 1931.

Hoover entered the senior course at the Naval War College in Newport, Rhode Island in May 1931 and graduated in June of the following year. He was subsequently appointed as the commanding officer of the Naval Air Station San Diego, California and was promoted to captain on June 30, 1933. Hoover remained in that assignment until June 1934, when he was appointed Chief of Staff, Commander Aircraft, Base Force under Rear Admiral Alfred W. Johnson.

Captain Hoover was appointed commanding officer of aircraft carrier USS Langley in mid-June 1935 and commanded his ship during the patrolling, fleet exercises off the coast of Hawaii.

He was detached from Langley in July 1936 and entered instruction at the Army War College in Washington, D.C. and graduated in July of the following year. Hoover then assumed command of Naval Air Station Norfolk, Virginia and served in this capacity until June 1938, when he assumed command of aircraft carrier USS Lexington. His tour of duty ended in June 1939, when he assumed duty as Chief of Staff and aide to Commander Aircraft, Battle Force under Vice Admiral Charles A. Blakely. Hoover later served in this capacity under new Rear Admiral William F. Halsey. Hoover was promoted to the rank of rear admiral on July 1, 1941.

== World War II ==
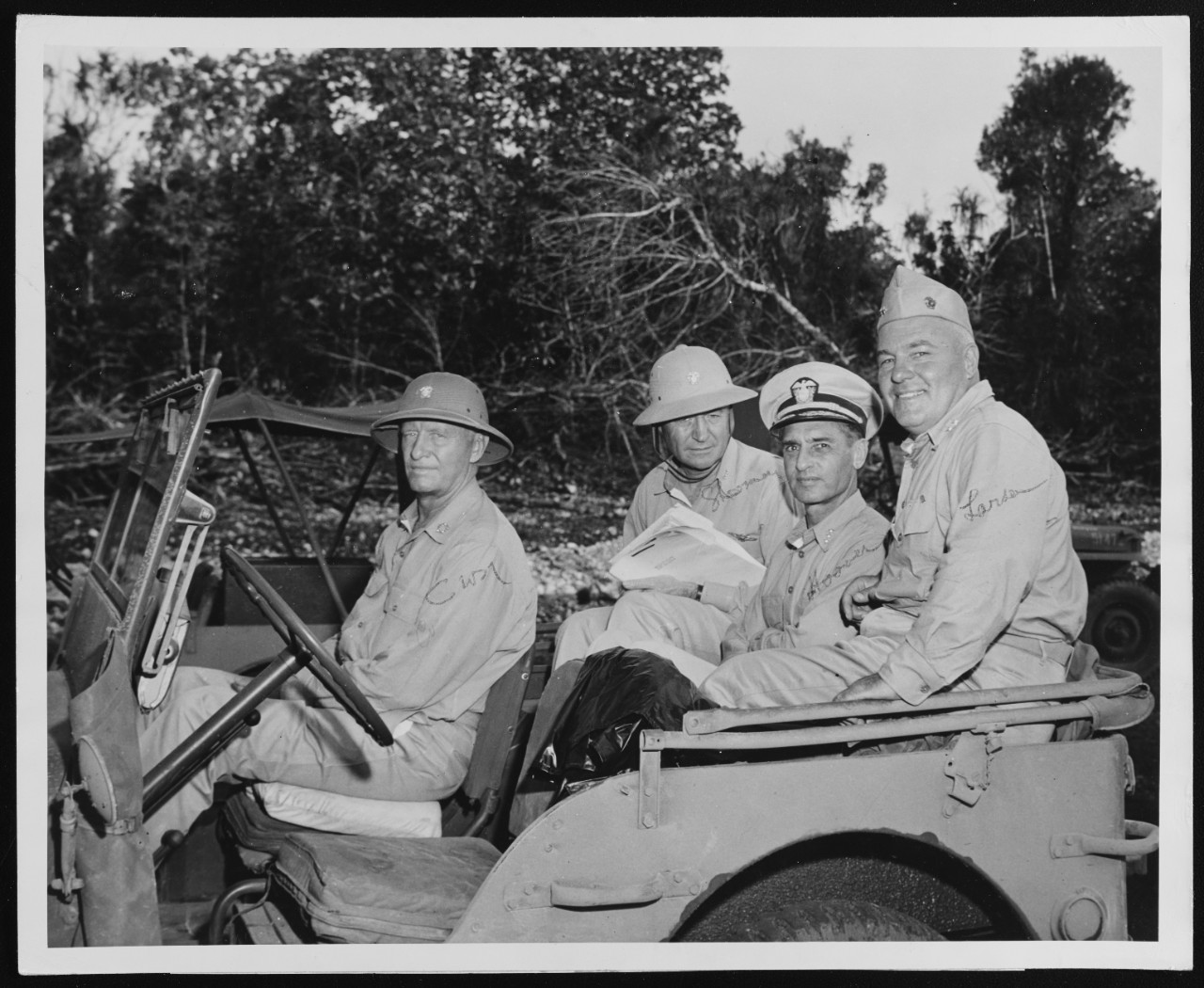
Fleet Admiral Chester Nimitz in a Jeep on Guam with some of his Staff Officers. L to R: Admiral Nimitz, Rear Admiral Forrest Sherman, Hoover, and Major General Henry L. Larsen, 1945.

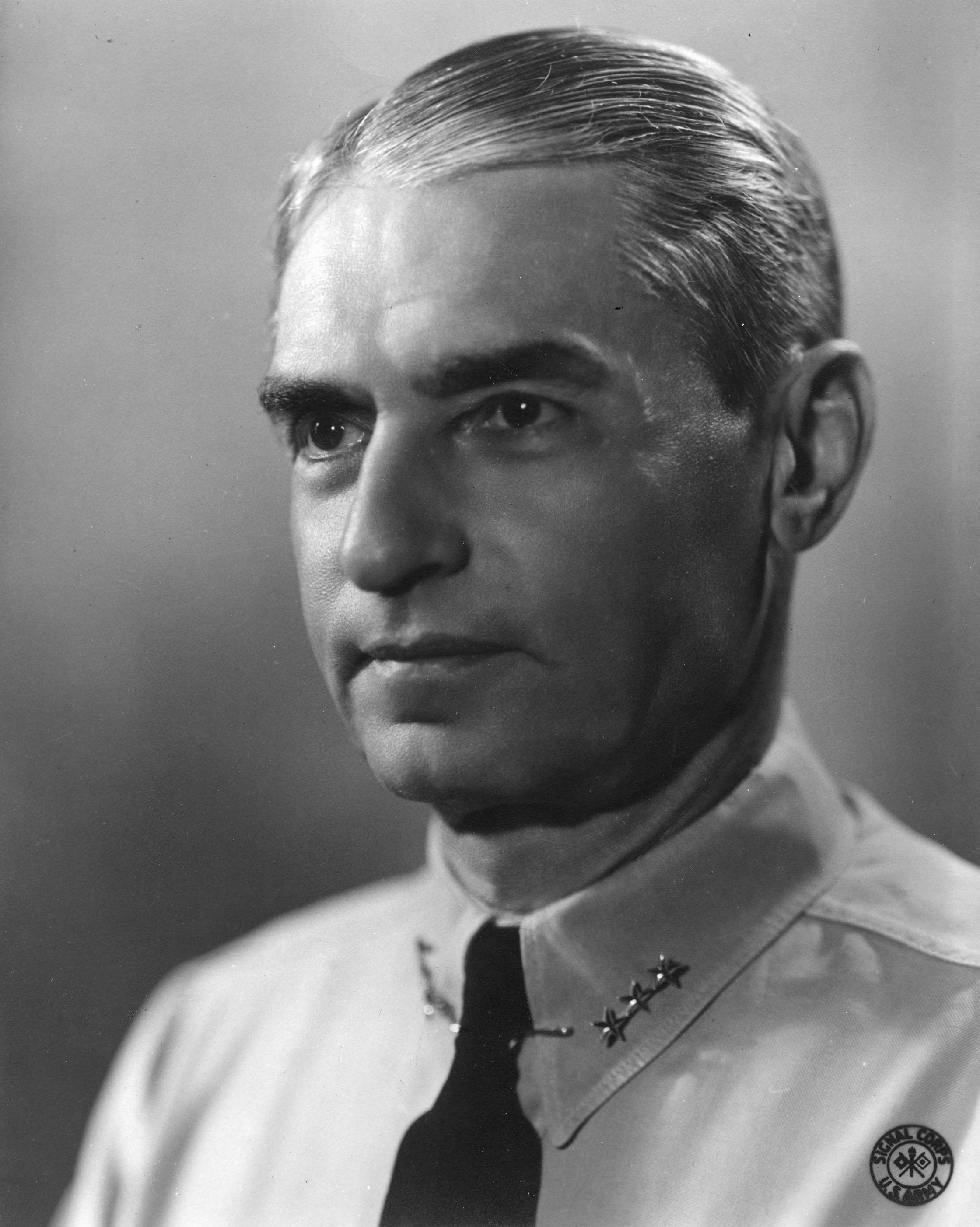
Commandant Tenth Naval District Caribbean Sea Frontier, San Juan, Puerto Rico (1941-1943)

Hoover was appointed Commandant, Tenth Naval District with headquarters in San Juan, Puerto Rico on December 7, 1941, the day the United States entered the World War II, and was responsible for the defense of Puerto Rico, Vieques, Culebra, Virgin Islands, and the Naval Reservation, Guantanamo, and US Naval shore activities at Jamaica, Trinidad, Bahamas, Antigua, St. Lucia, and British Guiana. He later assumed additional duty as Commander, Caribbean Sea Frontier and was promoted to temporary rank of Vice Admiral on May 25, 1942.

During his tenure, he was fighting German U-boats in the Caribbean and watching the Vichy force at Martinique with a force of just two destroyers, two ancient submarine chasers, three ancient submarines, and a wing of Catalinas. He was experienced with airfield construction and operations, was given command of the land-based naval air force that supported the Central Pacific campaign, and was tasked to develop the new air bases on the captured islands. Hoover remained in that capacity until August 1943 and received a Navy Distinguished Service Medal for his service in the Caribbean.

In August 1943, Hoover was appointed Commander, Land-based Air, Central Pacific and remained in that command until December that year, when his command was redesignated first to Commander, Aircraft, Central Pacific and then to Commander, Central Pacific Forward Area. He served in this capacities under Fleet Admiral Chester Nimitz during Tarawa, Kwajalein and Eniwetok in the Gilbert and Marshall Islands and Saipan, Guam in the Mariana and Palau Islands. Hoover organized the area of his command for most effective support of future fleet operations and led his powerful land-based strike group deep into hostile territory, bombing and strafing the enemy's formidable defenses in daring offensive operations which materially softened objectives for the amphibious attack forces advancing under cover of his search and reconnaissance planes. He received his second Navy Distinguished Service Medal for his service in these campaigns.

In December 1944, Admiral William F. Halsey Jr., Commander, U.S. Third Fleet underrated the upcoming Typhoon Cobra and lost three destroyers with 790 lives lost. Nine other warships were damaged, and over 100 aircraft were wrecked or washed overboard. Hoover was appointed President of the Court of Inquiry that ultimately recommended Halsey face court-martial for sailing Third Fleet into a typhoon. However, Hoover's recommendation was ignored by the Chief of Naval Operations Ernest J. King and President Franklin D. Roosevelt, who likely felt Halsey was too much of a popular hero to be subjected to public rebuke.

Hoover continued as Commander, Central Pacific Forward Area for the rest of the War and his forces participated in the Battle of Iwo Jima in February 1945. He served briefly as Deputy Commander-in-Chief, Pacific Ocean Area and Pacific Fleet under Fleet Admiral Nimitz in July and August 1945 and returned to the United States shortly thereafter. For his service in last year of the War, Hoover received his third Navy Distinguished Service Medal.

== Later career and retirement ==
Following his return stateside, Hoover was ordered to Naval Air Station San Diego, California and assumed duty as Commander, Fleet Air West Coast. He was later appointed President of the Naval Examining Board and Naval Retiring Board and served in this capacity until May 1947, when he was appointed a senior member, Army-Navy Petroleum Board, which was responsible for the effecting close co-operation between the two departments in procurement, shipment and distribution.

Hoover served in this capacity until July 1948, when he retired from the active duty after 41 years of service and was advanced to the rank of four-star admiral on the retired list for having been specially commended in combat. In December 1950, he was appointed Director of investigation for anti-inflation program within Economic Stabilization Agency. Hoover was responsible for the creating and directing of the enforcement machinery for any price and wage controls imposed by the stabilization agency.

Admiral Hoover died on December 1, 1970, aged 83, in Washington, D.C. and was buried with full military honors at Arlington National Cemetery, Virginia. His wife Helen Braconier Smith Hoover (1896–1981) is buried beside him. They had two daughters, Helen Marie Hoover (1917-1994) and Jeanne Patricia (Hoover) Mears (1927-2019) and a son, William Howard Hoover (1923-2005), who also served in the Navy and retired as captain.

== Awards and decorations ==
Here is the ribbon bar of Admiral Hoover:

Naval Aviator Badge
1st Row	Navy Cross		
2nd Row	Navy Distinguished Service Medal with two 5/16" Gold Stars	World War I Victory Medal with Escort Clasp	American Defense Service Medal with Destroyer Clasp
3rd Row	American Campaign Medal with Anti-Submarine Clasp	Asiatic-Pacific Campaign Medal with three 3/16 inch service stars	World War II Victory Medal

== Dates of rank ==
Midshipman (cadet rank)	Ensign (permanent rank)	Lieutenant Junior Grade (permanent rank)	Lieutenant (permanent rank)	Lieutenant Commander (temporary rank for War service)	Commander (temporary rank for War service)	Lieutenant Commander (permanent rank)
	O-1	O-2	O-3	O-4	O-5	O-4
June 12, 1903	September 13, 1908	September 13, 1911	March 22, 1915	August 31, 1917	September 21, 1918	July 1, 1919

Commander (permanent rank)	Captain (permanent rank)	Commodore	Rear Admiral (permanent rank)	Vice Admiral (temporary rank for War service)	Admiral (retirement rank)
O-5	O-6	O-7	O-8
June 3, 1922	June 30, 1933	never held	July 1, 1941	May 25, 1942	July 1948 (retired)
