= USS Blakeley =

Wickes-class destroyer

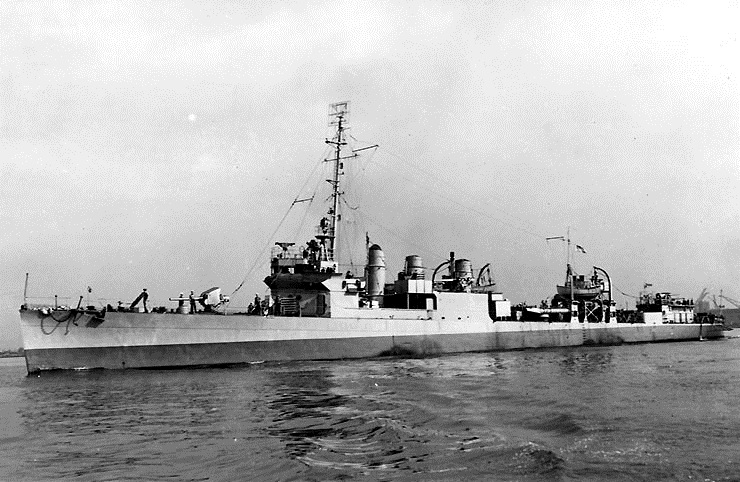
- USS Blakeley in September 1942, after modernization

History

United States
- Name: Blakeley
- Namesake: Johnston Blakeley
- Builder: William Cramp & Sons, Philadelphia
- Cost: $1,448,367.50 (hull & machinery)
- Yard number: 465
- Laid down: 26 March 1918
- Launched: 19 September 1918
- Commissioned: 8 May 1919
- Decommissioned: 29 June 1922
- Recommissioned: 1932
- Decommissioned: 1937
- Recommissioned: 16 October 1939
- Decommissioned: 21 July 1945
- Stricken: 13 August 1945
- Fate: Sold for scrapping 30 November 1945

General characteristics
- Class & type: Wickes-class destroyer
- Displacement: 1,154 tons
- Length: 314 ft 5 in (95.8 m)
- Beam: 31 ft 8 in (9.7 m)
- Draft: 9 ft 0 in (2.7 m)
- Speed: 35 knots (65 km/h)
- Complement: 122 officers and enlisted
- Armament: 4 × 4 in (102 mm) guns; 2 × 3 in (76 mm) gun; 12 × 21 in (533 mm) torpedo tubes

The second USS Blakeley (DD–150) was a Wickes-class destroyer in the United States Navy, named for Captain Johnston Blakeley.

Built in 1918, she saw patrol duty along the East Coast of the United States during the interwar era. Decommissioned for several years, she returned to duty at the outset of World War II. She spent much of the war on convoy patrol duty in the Caribbean Sea. On 25 May 1942, while on patrol, she was struck by a torpedo fired by the German submarine U-156, which blew off her forward 60 feet (18 m). Fitted with temporary measures, she steamed to Philadelphia Naval Yard where she was fitted with the forward section of sister ship USS Taylor. She spent much of the rest of the war on convoy patrol duty before being sold for scrap in 1945.

== Design and construction ==
Blakeley was one of 111 Wickes-class destroyers built by the United States Navy between 1917 and 1919. She, along with 20 of her sisters, were constructed at William Cramp & Sons shipyards in Philadelphia using specifications and detail designs drawn up by Bath Iron Works.

She had a standard displacement of 1,154 tonnes (1,136 long tons; 1,272 short tons) an overall length of 314 feet 5 inches (95.8 m), a beam of 31 feet 8 inches (9.7 m) and a draft of 9 feet 0 inches (2.7 m). On trials, Blakeley reached a speed of 35 knots (65 km/h). She was armed with four 4"/50 caliber guns, two 3"/23 caliber guns, and twelve torpedo tubes for 21-inch (533 mm) torpedoes. She had a regular crew complement of 122 officers and enlisted men. She was driven by two Curtis steam turbines powered by four Yarrow boilers.

Specifics on Blakeley's performance are not known, but she was one of the group of Wickes-class destroyers known unofficially as the 'Liberty Type' to differentiate them from the destroyers constructed from detail designs drawn up by Bethlehem Steel, which used Parsons or Westinghouse turbines. The 'Liberty' type destroyers deteriorated badly in service, and in 1929 all 60 of this group were retired by the Navy. Actual performance of these ships was far below intended specifications especially in fuel economy, with most only able to make 2,300 nautical miles (4,260 km) at 15 knots (28 km/h) instead of the design standard of 3,100 nautical miles (5,741 km) at 20 knots (37 km/h). The class also suffered problems with turning and weight.

Blakeley was launched on 19 September 1918 by William Cramp & Sons Ship and Engine Building Company in Philadelphia and sponsored by the wife of Charles Adams Blakeley. The ship was commissioned on 8 May 1919. She was the second ship to be named for Johnston Blakeley, the first was a torpedo boat commissioned in 1904. A subsequent USS Blakely would be commissioned, this one a Knox-class frigate. This third ship would also be named for Charles Adams Blakely.

== History ==
Upon commissioning, Blakeley immediately joined the Atlantic Fleet. Blakeley patrolled along the East Coast of the United States until she was decommissioned on 29 June 1922, and returned to Philadelphia. She was recommissioned from 1932 to 1937 to serve with the Scouting Fleet, and then was again decommissioned at Philadelphia. Low military budgets were the cause of these periods of inactivity, as the Navy did not have the funds or manpower to maintain a number of ships, including Blakeley.

Blakeley was again commissioned on 16 October 1939. She then joined the Neutrality Patrol until the Japanese attack on Pearl Harbor and the U.S. entrance into World War II. She then began convoy duty in the Caribbean Sea, including a February 1942 mission to guard a convoy carrying troops to garrison Curaçao in the Netherlands West Indies.

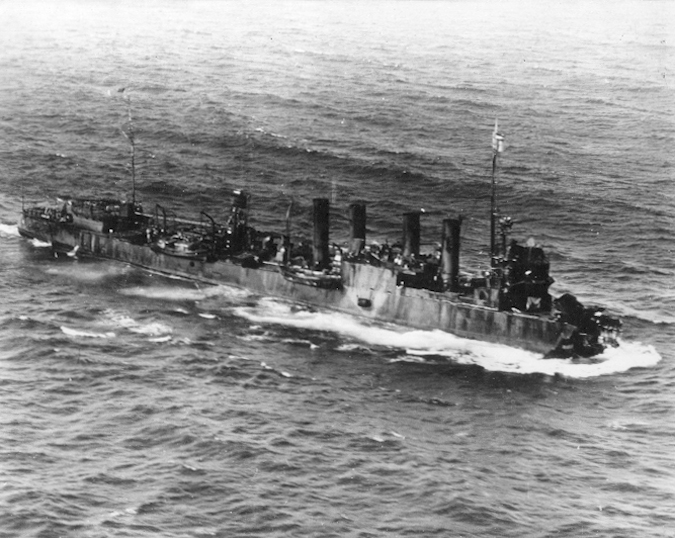
The heavily damaged USS Blakeley after the attack by U-156

On 25 May 1942, Blakeley was on a patrol off Martinique, inspecting all incoming ships for evidence of activities by Vichy French collaborators alongside her sister ship USS Ellis. At 08:30 a.m., she altered course to pursue a sound ping on her sonar. Nothing was found at the site of the ping, and the crew assumed it was caused by a school of blackfish. As the ship turned to resume its course, it was struck by a torpedo fired by the unnoticed German submarine U-156 under the command of Werner Hartenstein. The torpedo struck between frames 18 and 24 at about 4 feet (1 m) below her water line. The force of the impact blew off 60 feet (18 m) of her forward bow and forecastle. After several minutes, the crew determined they could still operate the ship, and it was brought back under control and sailed for Fort-de-France. The ship was steered with a combination of rudder and varying shaft speeds, and four hours after the attack, she was moored in Fort-de-France. Six men died and twenty one were wounded during the attack. Hartstein radioed a U-boat headquarters in Lorient requesting permission to finish Blakeley off, but permission was denied. Destroyers Breckinridge, Greer, Tarbell and two PBY Catalina planes from VP-53 were scrambled to assist the stricken Blakeley.

At Fort-de-France, she was fitted with a wooden bulkhead to cover the area blown off by the torpedo, and an anchor was improvised out of a truck's axle and differential housing. She then sailed under her own power to San Juan, Puerto Rico where a steel stub bow was attached. From there, the steamed for Philadelphia Naval Yard for permanent repairs. During mid-1942, Blakeley was fitted with the forward section of her decommissioned sister ship, Taylor. She was also fitted with newer weapons and electronics systems, such as updated radar. Repairs were completed in September 1942 and she resumed her convoy duties in the Caribbean.

Blakeley spent most of the rest of the war on convoy escort duty in the Caribbean Sea Frontier, except for two short deployments in the Atlantic Ocean. On 1 January to 23 February 1943 she was assigned to hunter-killer duty with Task Group 21.13 in the North Atlantic, and from 24 March to 11 May 1943, she escorted a convoy to Bizerte, Tunisia. From 18 March to 13 June 1945, she was stationed at New London, Connecticut, training U.S. submariners in Long Island Sound to avoid destroyers.

Following this duty, Blakeley was decommissioned at Philadelphia Naval Yard on 21 July 1945 and sold for scrap on 30 November 1945. She received one battle star for her wartime convoy duty.
