= Blakely, Pennsylvania =

Borough in Pennsylvania, US

- Borough
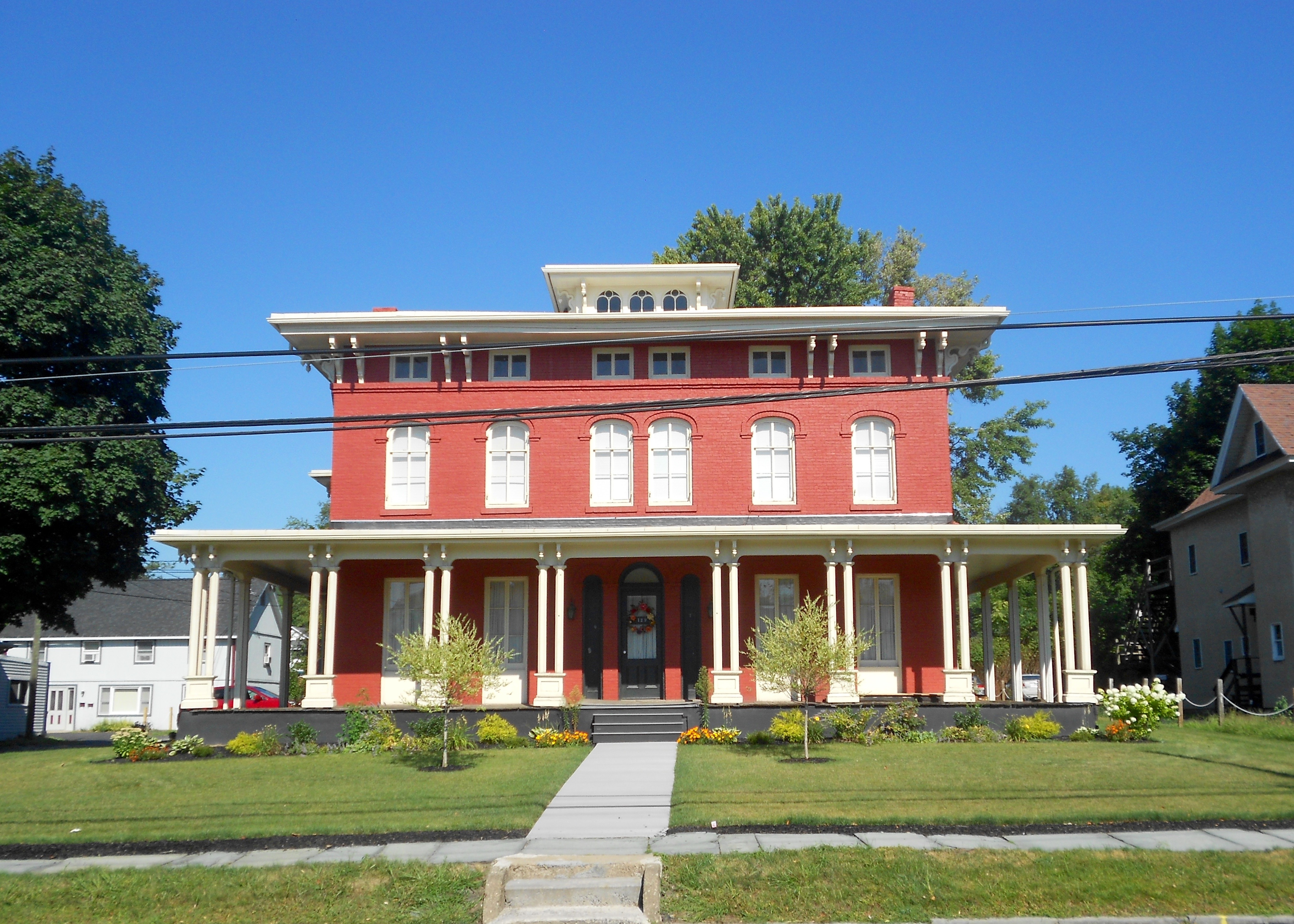
- House on Main Street

- Location in Lackawanna County, Pennsylvania

- Location in Pennsylvania Location in the United States
- Coordinates: 41°29′N 75°36′W
- Country: United States
- State: Pennsylvania
- County: Lackawanna
- Established: 27 August 1867

Government
  - Mayor: Jeanette Acciare-Mariani

Area
  - Total: 3.81 sq mi (9.88 km^{2})
  - Land: 3.81 sq mi (9.88 km^{2})
  - Water: 0 sq mi (0.00 km^{2})
- Elevation: 856 ft (261 m)

Population (2020)
  - Total: 6,657
  - Density: 1,746.0/sq mi (674.12/km^{2})
- Time zone: UTC-5 (EST)
  - Summer (DST): UTC-4 (EDT)
- ZIP Code: 18452
- Area code: 570
- FIPS code: 42-06928
- Website: blakelyborough.com

Blakely is a borough in Lackawanna County, Pennsylvania, United States. It is part of Northeastern Pennsylvania. The population was 6,657 at the 2020 census.

The Lackawanna River flows through Blakely, and within the borough is the village of Peckville.

== History ==
Blakely Township was formed in 1818 from portions of old Providence Township and recently formed Greenfield Township, and named after War of 1812 naval hero Johnston Blakely, who captained the sloop Wasp in battle against the British Cruizer-class brig-sloop Avon in 1814. As the first borough established from a portion of old Blakely Township, the Borough of Blakely as created on 27 August 1867 is also named after Capt. Johnston Blakely, one of the most successful naval officers of his era. The "Johnston Blakeley Memorial" in Blakely is a large anchor from the aircraft carrier USS Wasp, decommissioned in the 1960s.

In the 1970s, Blakely was home to Masterpiece Inc., the seventh largest manufacturer of artificial Christmas trees.

== Geography ==
According to the U.S. Census Bureau, the borough has a total area of 3.8 square miles (9.8 km^{2}), all land.

== Demographics ==
Historical population
| Census | Pop. | Note | %± |
|---|---|---|---|
| 1870 | 659 | | — |
| 1880 | 871 | | 32.2% |
| 1890 | 2,452 | | 181.5% |
| 1900 | 3,915 | | 59.7% |
| 1910 | 5,345 | | 36.5% |
| 1920 | 6,564 | | 22.8% |
| 1930 | 8,260 | | 25.8% |
| 1940 | 8,106 | | −1.9% |
| 1950 | 6,828 | | −15.8% |
| 1960 | 6,374 | | −6.6% |
| 1970 | 6,391 | | 0.3% |
| 1980 | 7,438 | | 16.4% |
| 1990 | 7,222 | | −2.9% |
| 2000 | 7,027 | | −2.7% |
| 2010 | 6,564 | | −6.6% |
| 2020 | 6,657 | | 1.4% |
| 2021 (est.) | 6,660 | ▲ | 0.0% |

As of the census of 2010, there were 6,564 people, 2,816 households, and 1,742 families in the borough. The population density was 1,727.4 inhabitants per square mile (667.0/km^{2}). There were 3,024 housing units at an average density of 795.8 units per square mile (307.3 units/km^{2}). The racial makeup of the borough was 96.6% White, 1% African American, 0.1% Native American, 0.1% Pacific Islander, 0.7% Asian, 0.6% from other races, and 0.9% from two or more races. Hispanic or Latino of any race were 1.8% of the population.

There were 2,816 households, out of which 23% had children under the age of 18 living with them, 45.1% were married couples living together, 12.2% had a female householder with no husband present, and 38.1% were non-families. 33.2% of all households were made up of individuals, and 17.9% had someone living alone who was 65 years of age or older. The average household size was 2.23 and the average family size was 2.85.

In the borough the population was spread out, with 18.3% under the age of 18, 56.6% from 18 to 64, and 25.1% who were 65 years of age or older. The median age was 47.2 years.

The median income for a household in the borough was $38,153, and the median income for a family was $60,341. Males had a median income of $48,170 versus $32,158 for females. The per capita income for the borough was $23,063. About 6.6% of families and 12.4% of the population were below the poverty line, including 14.2% of those under age 18 and 5.3% of those age 65 or over.

== Parks and recreation ==
The "Blakely Borough Recreation Complex" is public sports complex located on the bank of the Lackawanna River.

== Notable people ==
- Gino J. Merli, Medal of Honor recipient
- Stan Palys, professional baseball player
- Joe Shaute, professional baseball player
- Bill Sienkiewicz, comic book artist
