= West Branch Tinklepaugh Creek =

River in Pennsylvania, USA

Physical characteristics
- Source
  - location: Hibbard Mountain in Scott Township, Lackawanna County, Pennsylvania
  - elevation: between 1,920 and 1,940 feet (590 and 590 m)
- Mouth
  - location: Wildcat Creek in Blakely, Lackawanna County, Pennsylvania
  - coordinates: 41°29′12″N 75°35′12″W
  - elevation: 843 ft (257 m)
- Length: 2.2 mi (3.5 km)
- Basin size: 1.490 sq mi (3.86 km^{2})

Basin features
- Progression: Wildcat Creek → Lackawanna River → Susquehanna River → Chesapeake Bay
- Tributaries
  - right: two unnamed tributaries

West Branch Tinklepaugh Creek is a tributary of Wildcat Creek in Lackawanna County, Pennsylvania, in the United States. It is approximately 2.2 miles (3.5 km) long and flows through Scott Township, Archbald, and Blakely. The watershed of the creek has an area of 1.490 square miles (3.86 km^{2}). A reach of the creek is considered to be impaired by abandoned mine drainage. A portion of the creek and its watershed is on coal measures.

== Course ==
West Branch Tinklepaugh Creek begins on Hibbard Mountain in Scott Township. It flows south-southeast for a few tenths of a mile and almost immediately enters Archbald. The creek then turns south for several tenths of a mile, entering Blakely and receiving an unnamed tributary from the right. It eventually receives another unnamed tributary from the right and turns east. Several hundred feet further downstream, it reaches its confluence with Wildcat Creek.

=== Tributaries ===
West Branch Tinklepaugh Creek has no named tributaries. However, it has an unnamed tributary with an ID of 65629761.

== Hydrology ==
A reach of 2.28 miles (3.67 km) of West Branch Tinklepaugh Creek is impaired. The source of the impairment is abandoned mine drainage and the cause is flow alterations. The creek was listed as impaired in 2002. Its unnamed tributary is also impaired for the same reason and was listed as such in 2002. A total maximum daily load is not required.

West Branch Tinklepaugh Creek is an intermittent stream. In a 2013 study, it was found to have a low discharge and was dry for most of the summer. It was dry between July and October 2013. A mid-20th-century report estimated that the rate of seepage of water from the surface into mine workings was 8.11 gallons per minute per inch of rain. The report estimated that the rate of seepage of water from the streambed into mine workings was 15.20 gallons per minute per inch of rain.

In a 2013 study, the electrical conductivity of West Branch Tinklepaugh Creek ranged from 14.00 to 49.50 micro-Siemens per centimeter. The average electrical conductivity was 28.69 micro-siemens per centimeter. All three of these values were outside of the ideal range. The concentration of total dissolved solids ranged from 7.00 to 20.00 milligrams per liter, with an average of 13.86 milligrams per liter. All three of these values were outside of the ideal range.

In the 2013 study, West Branch Tinklepaugh Creek ranged from slightly acidic to slightly alkaline. The minimum pH of the creek was 6.38, the average was 7.25 and the 7.95. The minimum value was outside of the ideal range, but the other two values were within it. The concentration of dissolved oxygen ranged from 83.06 percent to 172.40 percent, with an average of 133.70 percent. The minimum value was within the ideal range, but the other two values were outside of it. The concentration of salinity was once measured to be 10.00 parts per million. This value was within the ideal range.

== Geography, geology, and climate ==
The elevation near the mouth of West Branch Tinklepaugh Creek is 843 feet (257 m) above sea level. The elevation near the source of the creek is between 1,920 and 1,940 feet (590 and 590 m) above sea level.

A total of 0.861 square miles (2.23 km^{2}) of the watershed of West Branch Tinklepaugh Creek are in coal measures. A total of 11,400 feet (3,500 m) of the creek's length is on coal measures.

In 2013, the average water temperature of West Branch Tinklepaugh Creek ranged from 3.28 to 18.08 °C (37.90 to 64.54 °F). The average temperature was 8.75 °C (47.75 °F).

== Watershed ==
The watershed of West Branch Tinklepaugh Creek as an area of approximately 1.490 square miles (3.86 km^{2}). The mouth of the creek is in the United States Geological Survey quadrangle of Olyphant. However, its source is in the quadrangle of Carbondale.

In 2013, the habitat assessment score of West Branch Tinklepaugh Creek was an "optimal" 192 on a scale of 0 to 200. The creek's designated use is for aquatic life.

== History ==
West Branch Tinklepaugh Creek was entered into the Geographic Names Information System on January 1, 1990. Its identifier in the Geographic Names Information System is 1202419. The creek was added due to its presence in Patton's Philadelphia and Suburbs Street and Road Map, which was published in 1984.

== See also ==
- List of rivers of Pennsylvania
- List of tributaries of the Lackawanna River
