= USS Taylor (DD-94) =

American Wickes-class destroyer

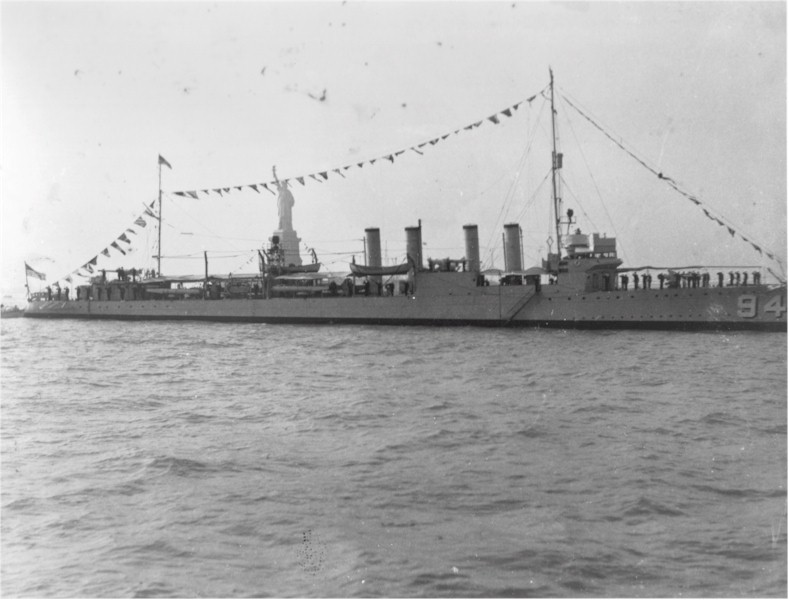
- USS Taylor in New York Harbor

History

United States
- Name: USS Taylor
- Namesake: Henry Taylor
- Builder: Mare Island Navy Yard, California
- Laid down: 15 October 1917
- Launched: 14 February 1918
- Commissioned: 1 June 1918
- Decommissioned: 21 June 1922
- Identification: DD-94
- Recommissioned: 1 May 1930
- Decommissioned: 23 September 1938
- Stricken: 6 December 1938
- Fate: Sold for scrap, August 1945

General characteristics
- Class & type: Wickes-class destroyer
- Displacement: 1,090 tonnes (1,073 long tons; 1,202 short tons)
- Length: 314 ft 1/2 in (95.7 m)
- Beam: 30 ft 11 3/4 in (9.4 m)
- Draft: 9 ft 0 in (2.7 m)
- Propulsion: 2 × Curtis steam turbines; 4 × Yarrow boilers; 24,200 shp (18,046 kW)
- Speed: 35 knots (65 km/h; 40 mph)
- Range: 2,300 nmi (4,260 km; 2,647 mi) at 15 knots (28 km/h; 17 mph)
- Complement: 122 officers and enlisted
- Armament: 4 × 4"/50 caliber guns; 1 × 3"/23 caliber gun; 12 × 21 in (533 mm) torpedo tubes

USS Taylor (DD-94) was a Wickes-class destroyer built in 1918 for the United States Navy, which saw service in World War I and the years following. She was named for Rear Admiral Henry Taylor.

One of 111 ships of her class, Taylor was commissioned near the end of World War I and patrolled in the Atlantic Ocean during and immediately following the war, though she saw no service supporting the war. After eight years out of commission, she returned to service in 1930 patrolling along the East Coast of the United States and in Latin America. Decommissioned in 1938, she then became a training hulk. During World War II her forward section was removed and grafted onto USS Blakeley after the latter ship was damaged in a submarine attack. Taylor continued to serve as a training hulk until she was sold for scrap in 1945.

== Design and construction ==
Taylor was one of 111 Wickes-class destroyers built by the United States Navy between 1917 and 1919. She, along with seven of her sisters, were constructed at Mare Island Navy Yard in San Francisco, California, using detailed designs drawn up by Bath Iron Works.

She had a standard displacement of 1,090 tonnes (1,070 long tons; 1,200 short tons) an overall length of 314 feet .5 inches (95.7 m), a beam of 30 feet 11.75 inches (9.4 m) and a draught of 9 feet 0 inches (2.7 m). On trials, Taylor reached a speed of 35 knots (65 km/h; 40 mph). She was armed with four 4"/50 caliber guns, one 3"/23 caliber gun, and twelve torpedo tubes for 21 in (533 mm) torpedoes. She had a regular crew complement of 122 officers and enlisted men. She was coal-powered, and driven by two Curtis steam turbines powered by four Yarrow boilers with an indicated horsepower of 24,200 shaft horsepower (18,000 kW).

Specifics on Taylor's performance are not known, but she was one of the group of Wickes-class destroyers known unofficially as the 'Liberty Type' to differentiate them from the destroyers constructed from detail designs drawn up by Bethlehem Steel, which used Parsons or Westinghouse turbines. The 'Liberty' type destroyers deteriorated badly in service, and in 1929 all 60 of this group were retired by the Navy. Actual performance of these ships was far below intended specifications especially in fuel economy, with most only able to make 2,300 nautical miles (4,300 km; 2,600 mi) at 15 knots (28 km/h; 17 mph) instead of the design standard of 3,100 nautical miles (5,700 km; 3,600 mi) at 20 knots (37 km/h; 23 mph). The class also suffered from poor maneuverability and were overweight.

She was the first U.S. Navy ship to be named USS Taylor, commemorating Navy admiral Henry Clay Taylor. A second Taylor would be commissioned in 1942, a Fletcher-class destroyer named for William Rogers Taylor. That ship saw extensive service in World War II, the Korean War, and the Vietnam War.

== History ==
Taylor was laid down as Destroyer No. 94 on 15 October 1917 by the Mare Island Navy Yard, and launched on 14 February 1918. She was commissioned on 1 June 1918, sponsored by Ms. Mary Gorgas.

Upon commissioning, Taylor joined Destroyer Division 12 of the Atlantic Fleet. She cruised with that fleet during World War I but saw no action. Following the war on 1 April 1919, she was assigned to Destroyer Division 8. In 1920, Taylor was placed in reduced commission though still operating on the Atlantic coast. That summer, on 17 July, the Navy adopted the alpha-numeric hull designation system, and Taylor became DD-94. In October, she was placed back in full commission and, until the summer of 1922, operated with Destroyer Division 8, Flotilla 8, Squadron 3. On 21 June 1922, the ship was placed out of commission at Philadelphia, Pennsylvania.

Taylor remained inactive there until 1 May 1930, when she was placed back in commission under the command of Commander George B. Keester. She was assigned to Destroyer Division 33, Squadron 7, which was part of the Scouting Fleet. During this time, she operated from Charleston, South Carolina, until November when she was placed in reduced commission once again. At the same time, Taylor was detached from the Scouting Fleet and transferred to Destroyer Division 47, Squadron 16 of the Training Squadron. She was assigned to the 6th and 7th Naval Districts to train reservists and to carry Reserve Officer Training Corps midshipmen on summer cruises. By 1 April 1931, Scouting Fleet became Scouting Force, and the destroyer was reassigned as an element of Division 28 of the Training Squadron. She operated with that unit until early in 1934 when she joined Squadron 19 of the rotating reserve with which she remained until late 1931.

On 1 September, she relieved the destroyer J. Fred Talbott on duty with the Special Service Squadron. She patrolled the West Indies and the Gulf of Mexico with that force for one year due to instability in Latin America. By 1 October 1935, Taylor was back with the Training Squadron as a unit of the newly established Division 30. She trained reservists until early in 1937 when she returned to the Special Service Squadron in relief of the destroyer Manley. She returned to patrols in the Caribbean area. Returning to the United States in 1938, Taylor was moored at Philadelphia to prepare for inactivation. The destroyer was placed out of commission on 23 September 1938. Her name was struck from the Naval Vessel Register on 6 December 1938, and she was offered for sale in July 1939. However, on 11 July 1940, she was redesignated Damage Control Hulk No. 40 and tasked to train damage control parties.

On 25 May 1942, sister ship Blakeley was struck by a torpedo fired from German submarine U-156 while patrolling off Martinique. The torpedo struck between frames 18 and 24 at about 4 feet (1.2 m) below Blakeley's water line, and the force of the impact blew off 60 feet (18 m) of her bow and forecastle. Sailing under her own power to Philadelphia Naval Yard, Blakeley had the forward 60 feet of Taylor's hull grafted onto her throughout the summer of 1942. This was completed in September 1942, and Blakeley, with Taylor's forward hull, served through the remainder of the war. The remaining 255 feet (78 m) of Taylor spent the remainder of World War II in her duties as a training hulk. She was sold for scrap in 1945, and delivered on 8 August.

== Sources ==
- Bonner, Kermit H. (1996), Final Voyages, Paducah, Kentucky: Turner Publishing Company, ISBN 978-1-56311-289-8
- Dictionary of American naval fighting ships / Vol.7, Historical sketches: letters T through V, Washington, D.C.: Department of the Navy, 1981, OCLC 551573855
- Friedman, Norman (2003), United States Destroyers: An Illustrated Design History, Annapolis, Maryland: Naval Institute Press, ISBN 978-1-55750-442-5
- Gardiner, Robert; Gray, Randal (1985), Conway's All the World's Fighting Ships 1906–1921, Volume 2, Annapolis, Maryland: Naval Institute Press, ISBN 978-0-87021-907-8
