= Peckville, Pennsylvania =

Village in Pennsylvania, U.S.

Coordinates: 41°28′35″N 75°34′24″W

Peckville is a village in Lackawanna County, Pennsylvania, United States, roughly 8 miles (13 km) northwest of Scranton. The governing borough of Peckville is Blakely.

Peckville was named for Samuel Peck, who moved to northeastern Pennsylvania from Massachusetts in 1831, and built a saw and grist mill at the site of the current village. His son John D. Peck was a bank president in Peckville. In the early 1900s, Peckville had a weekly newspaper, The Peckville Journal, a public school, and the Peckville National Bank.

== See also ==
- Blakely, Pennsylvania
