= Johnston Blakeley =

United States Navy officer (1781–1814)

- Blakeley in 1846 lithograph, entitled Naval Heroes of the United States
- Born: October 1781; Seaforde, County Down, Ireland
- Died: October 1814 (aged 32–33); Atlantic Ocean
- Burial place: Lost at sea
- Relatives: Charles Adams Blakely (great-grandnephew)
- Military career
- Allegiance: United States
- Branch: United States Navy
- Service years: 1800–1814
- Rank: Captain (posthumous)
- Commands: Enterprise; Wasp
- Conflicts: Quasi-War; War of 1812
- Awards: Thanks of Congress; Congressional Gold Medal

Johnston Blakeley (October 1781 – October 1814) was a United States Navy officer who served during the Quasi-War and the War of 1812. He is considered to be one of the most successful American naval officers of the period.

== Early life ==
Blakeley was born near Seaforde, County Down, Ireland. Brought to the United States as a child in 1783, he graduated from the University of North Carolina at Chapel Hill, where he was a member of the Dialectic and Philanthropic Societies, in 1800, then joined the Navy and was appointed a Midshipman in 1800.

After service on President during the Quasi-War with France and command of Enterprise early in the War of 1812, Master Commandant Blakeley was appointed to command of the newly built sloop-of-war Wasp.

In 1814, he made a very successful cruise which in June included the sinking of HMS Reindeer. In September, in a similar action, Blakeley sunk HMS Avon. That month he also captured the mercantile brig Atalanta. Wasp was last heard of 9 October 1814 and is believed to have foundered in a gale. Blakeley received the Thanks of Congress, a gold medal, and posthumous advancement to the rank of Captain for his last cruise.

Captain Blakeley was married, in December, 1813, to Miss Jane Hoope, the daughter of his father's old friend, Mr. Hoope, of New York; and has left an only daughter, who received one of the most noble and substantial and affecting tributes of national gratitude which has occurred in the history of this country. The legislature of North Carolina, on 27 December 1816, after prescribing the destination of the sword they had voted to Captain Blakeley, "Resolved, unanimously, That Captain Blakeley's child be educated at the expense of this State; and that Mrs. Jane Blakeley be requested to draw on the Treasurer of this State, from time to time, for such sums of money as shall be required for the education of the said child."

== Honors ==
=== Ships ===
Three ships have been named USS Blakely in Captain Blakeley's honor:

- USS Blakely (TB-27), a new class of torpedo boat in 1904 for the United States Navy
- USS Blakeley (DD-150), a Wickes-class destroyer during World War II
- USS Blakely (FF-1072) Knox-class destroyer escort, later to be reclassified as a frigate, named for both Captain Johnston Blakely and Vice Admiral Charles Adams Blakely

=== Places ===
- Blakely, Georgia, county seat of Early County
- Blakely Borough, Pennsylvania, established 27 August 1867
- Blakely Township, Pennsylvania (est. 1818)
- Port Blakely, named by Charles Wilkes during the Wilkes Expedition of 1838-1842
- Blakely Island, part of the San Juan Islands in Washington state

Also part of the San Juan Islands chain are a group of islands to which Wilkes bestowed the name "Wasp Islands" after the Wasp. Their namesake, however, was not the same vessel commanded by Blakely, but an earlier Wasp, also a sloop-of-war, which was commissioned in 1807 and captured by the British in the early months of the War of 1812.

=== Other ===
- Capt. Johnston Blakely Elementary School in Bainbridge Island, Washington

== See also ==
- List of people who disappeared mysteriously at sea
