= USS Wasp (1814) =

Sloop-of-war of the United States Navy

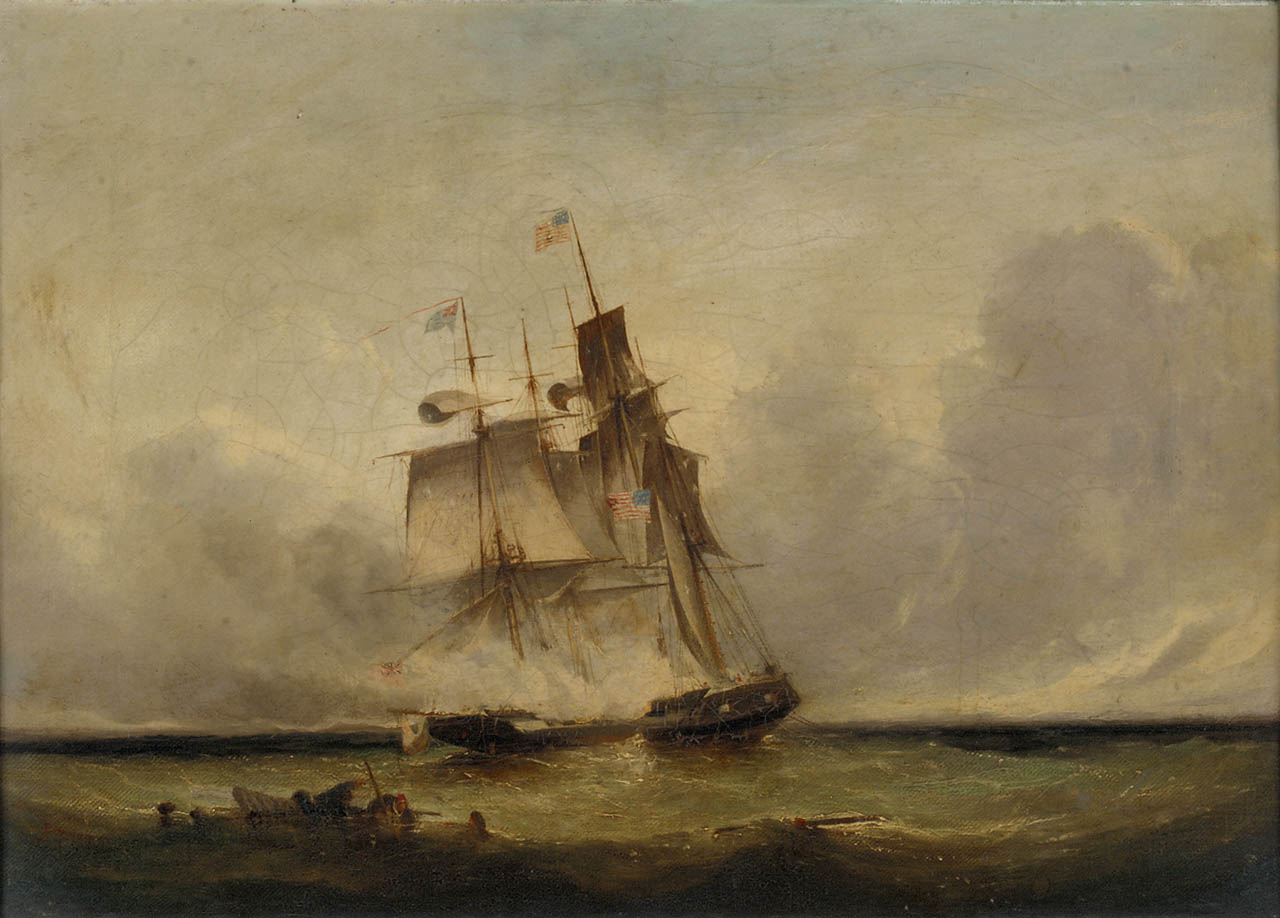
- Painting of Wasp (right) capturing HMS Reindeer by Edwin Hayes

History

United States
- Name: USS Wasp
- Namesake: Wasp
- Builder: Cross & Merrill, Newburyport, Massachusetts
- Launched: September 18, 1813
- Commissioned: February 1814
- Fate: Disappeared October 1814

General characteristics
- Type: Sloop-of-war
- Tonnage: 509
- Length: 117 ft 0 in (35.66 m)
- Beam: 31 ft 6 in (9.60 m)
- Draft: 14 ft 6 in (4.42 m)
- Sail plan: Ship-rigged
- Complement: 173 officers and enlisted men
- Armament: 2 × long 12-pounder guns; 20 × 32-pounder carronades

USS Wasp was a sloop-of-war that served in the United States Navy in 1814 during the War of 1812. She was the fifth United States Navy ship to carry that name. She carried out two successful raiding voyages against British trade during the summer of 1814, in the course of which she captured two brig-sloops of the Royal Navy. Wasp was lost, cause unknown, in the Atlantic in early autumn, 1814.

== Service history ==
Wasp was a ship-rigged sloop-of-war constructed in 1813 at Newburyport, Massachusetts, by Cross & Merrill. She was commissioned in February of 1814, with Master Commandant Johnston Blakeley in command. She remained at Portsmouth, New Hampshire, until late spring awaiting sailing orders and, upon receipt of them, put to sea on 1 May 1814 for a war cruise to the western approaches to the English Channel.

=== First raiding voyage ===
Wasp captured her first vessel, the 207-ton barque Neptune, on 2 June 1814, embarked her crew as prisoners, and burned the prize at sea. On 13 June 1814, she took William, a 91-ton brig, and burned her as well. Wasp encountered the 131-ton armed brig Pallas on 18 June 1814, captured her, apparently without resistance, and scuttled her. Her fourth victim, 171-ton galiot Henrietta, which she took on 23 June 1814, was given up to the prisoners Wasp had thus far taken. On 26 June 1814, Wasp captured and scuttled the 325-ton ship Orange Boven.

=== Capture of HMS Reindeer ===
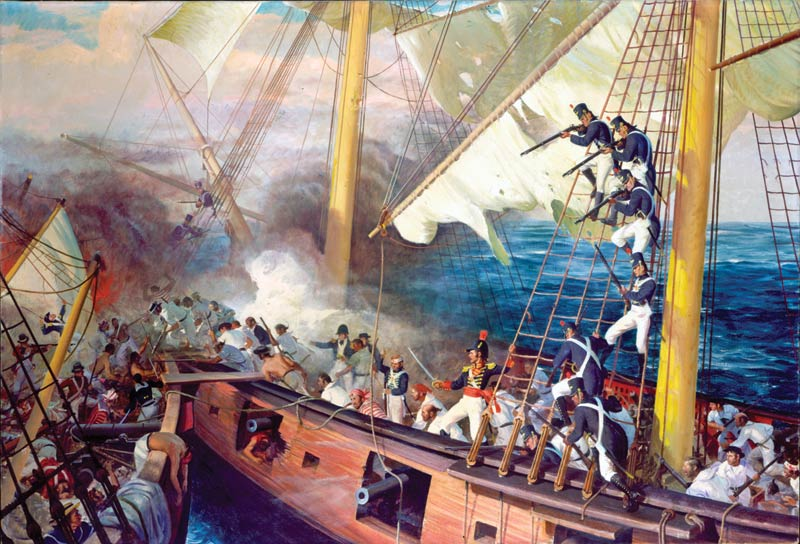
1945 painting of Wasp's crew boarding Reindeer by John Clymer

On 28 June 1814, Wasp came upon the 18-gun Cruizer-class brig-sloop HMS Reindeer some 225 miles west of Plymouth, England, and brought her to battle. The fight lasted only 19 minutes, but during that brief span of time the two ships traded a murderous fire of grape and solid shot. Several times, Reindeer's crew tried to board Wasp, but the American crew repulsed them on each occasion. In the end, Wasp's own ship's company boarded Reindeer and captured the ship. Wasp suffered six hits in her hull, and some of her rigging was shot away, but she remained capable of sailing. Reindeer had suffered 25 men killed, including her captain, Commander William Manners, and 42 wounded.

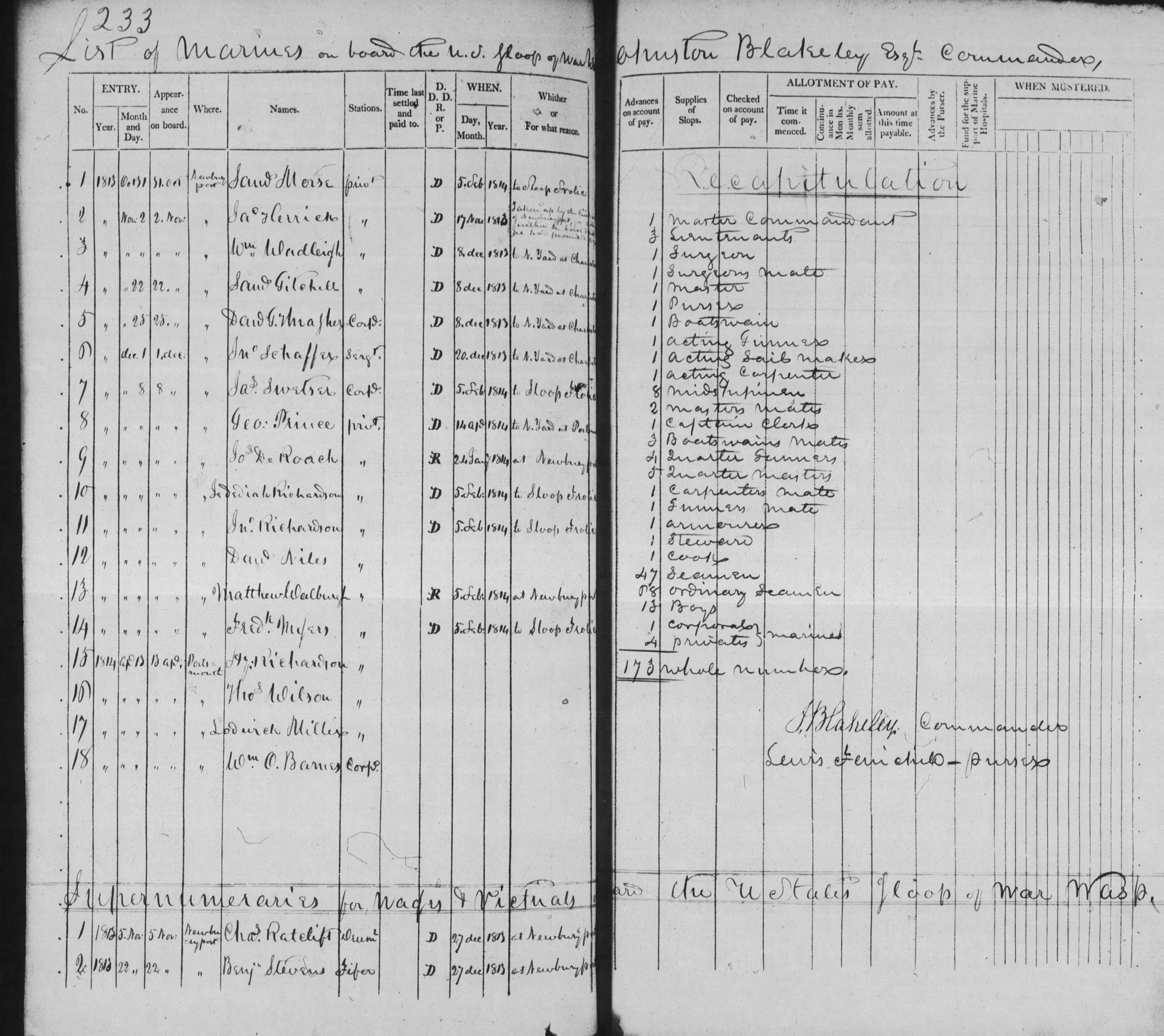
Muster USS Wasp, 1813 -1814, recap signed Johnston Blakeley & Lewis Fairchild

After taking prisoners on board, setting fire to Reindeer, and watching her explode, Wasp set course for Lorient, France. En route, she took two more prizes, the 112-ton brig Regulator on 4 July 1814 and the 151-ton schooner Jenny on 6 July 1814. Jenny had been sailing from Leghorn to St Petersburg when Wasp captured her. On 7 July another vessel came across Jenny and reported that her masts were cut away and she was full of water. Not long thereafter, Wasp entered Lorient for repairs, provisions, and care for her wounded. Wasp brought Jenny's crew with her and put them on a cartel for Britain.

=== Second raiding voyage ===
Wasp remained in Lorient until she again put to sea on 27 August 1814. On 30 August 1814, she captured the brig Lettice and, on 31 August 1814, took another, Bon Accord. Early in the morning of 1 September 1814, she encountered a convoy of 10 ships escorted by the 74-gun ship-of-the-line HMS Armada. Wasp made for the convoy and singled out the brig Mary, which she quickly took as a prize, carrying off Mary's crew as prisoners and burning her. The American sloop then attempted to take another ship in the convoy, but Armada chased her off.

=== Sinking of HMS Avon ===
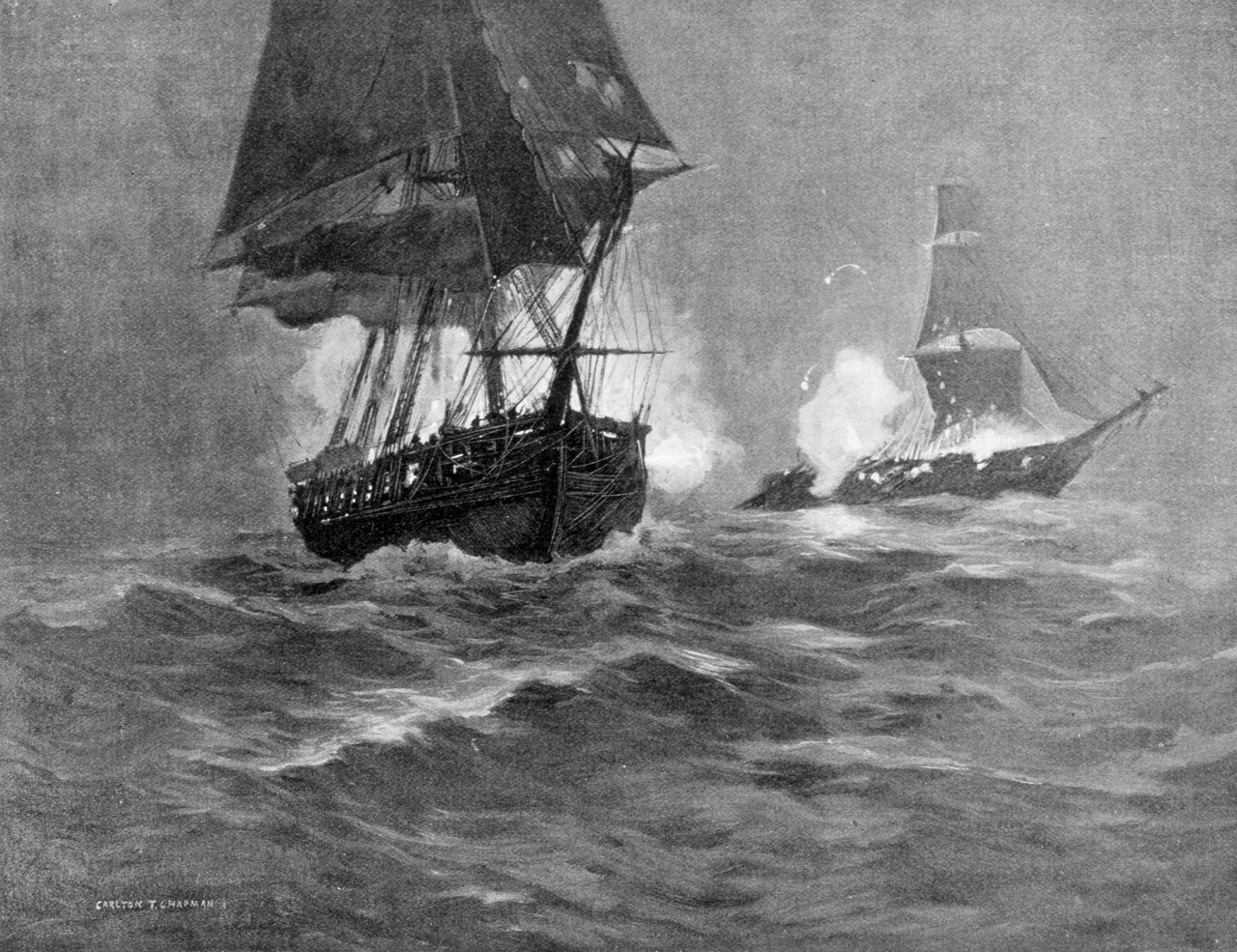
1896 illustration of Wasp engaging Avon by Carlton T. Chapman

That evening, she spied another sail on the horizon and gave chase. By 2130, she had the brig under her lee bow and opened fire. The enemy returned fire until 2200 at which time her battery seemed to cease fire. When Wasp did the same and called for the stranger's surrender, the British ship answered with another cannonade. Wasp again opened fire on the ship, now known to have been the 18-gun, 391-ton brig HMS Avon. Some broadsides later, Avon's guns fell silent once more, and Wasp repeated the call for surrender. Avon, at this point a battered hulk, had no choice but to comply.

However, just as Wasp began to lower the boat for the prize crew, the lookout sighted another enemy brig standing toward the two adversaries. Wasp's crew manned their battle stations immediately in hope of taking the newcomer as well. Just then, two more British ships appeared on the horizon and Wasp was forced to abandon Avon and see to her own salvation. The lead British ship, however, failed to engage Wasp; instead, she hauled in close to Wasp's stern and loosed a broadside into the American's rigging which damaged sails, sheets, and braces considerably and then came about to rendezvous with the other two ships following her and the sinking Avon. Although the Americans did not know it at the time, Avon sank soon after Wasp left her. Avon had suffered 10 killed and 32 wounded. Avon's primary rescuer was her sister ship, Castilian.

Wasp continued to target British merchant shipping. On 12 September 1814, she encountered Three Brothers, a brig, and scuttled her. On 14 September 1814, she sank the brig Bacchus. On 21 September 1814, an eight-gun brig, Atalanta (or Atlanta), ran afoul of Wasp, and she, too, suffered the ignominy of capture. Deeming Atalanta too valuable to destroy, Blakeley placed her under the command of Midshipman David Geisinger and sent her to the United States. She entered Savannah, Georgia, safely on 4 November 1814.

== Fate ==
After Wasp and Atalanta parted company, on 9 October 1814 she communicated with the Swedish brig Adonis, bound from Rio de Janeiro to Falmouth, England, about three weeks after the Atalanta capture. Wasp reported that she was headed for the Caribbean. After departing from Adonis, Wasp was never seen or heard from again and is believed to have been lost with all hands in a hurricane storm at Bermuda October 15-19 1814.

== Tables ==
=== First raiding cruise ===
First raiding cruise
Date	Ship name	Burthen	Ship Type	Location	Disposition of ship
2 June 1814	Neptune	207	Barque	English Channel	Burned
13	William	91	Brig	"	Burned
18	Pallas	131	Brig	"	Scuttled
23	Henrietta	171	Galiot	"	Prize; used as a cartel to transport prisoners
26	Orange Boven	325	Ship	"	scuttled
28	HMS Reindeer	385	18-gun Sloop	"	scuttled
4 July	Regulator	112	Brig	"	Prize
6	Jenny	151	Schooner	"	Prize

=== Second raiding cruise ===
Second raiding cruise
Date	Ship name	Burthen	Ship Type	Location	Disposition of ship
30 August 1814	Lettice		Brig	English Channel	Captured
31	Bon Accord		Brig	"	Captured
1 September	Mary		Brig	"	Captured
1	HMS Avon	391	18-gun Brig	"	Wrecked
12	Three Brothers		Brig	SW Approaches	Scuttled
14	Bacchus		Brig	"	Sank
21	Atalanta	252	8 gun Brig	Mid-Atlantic	Captured
