= USS Blakely (FF-1072) =

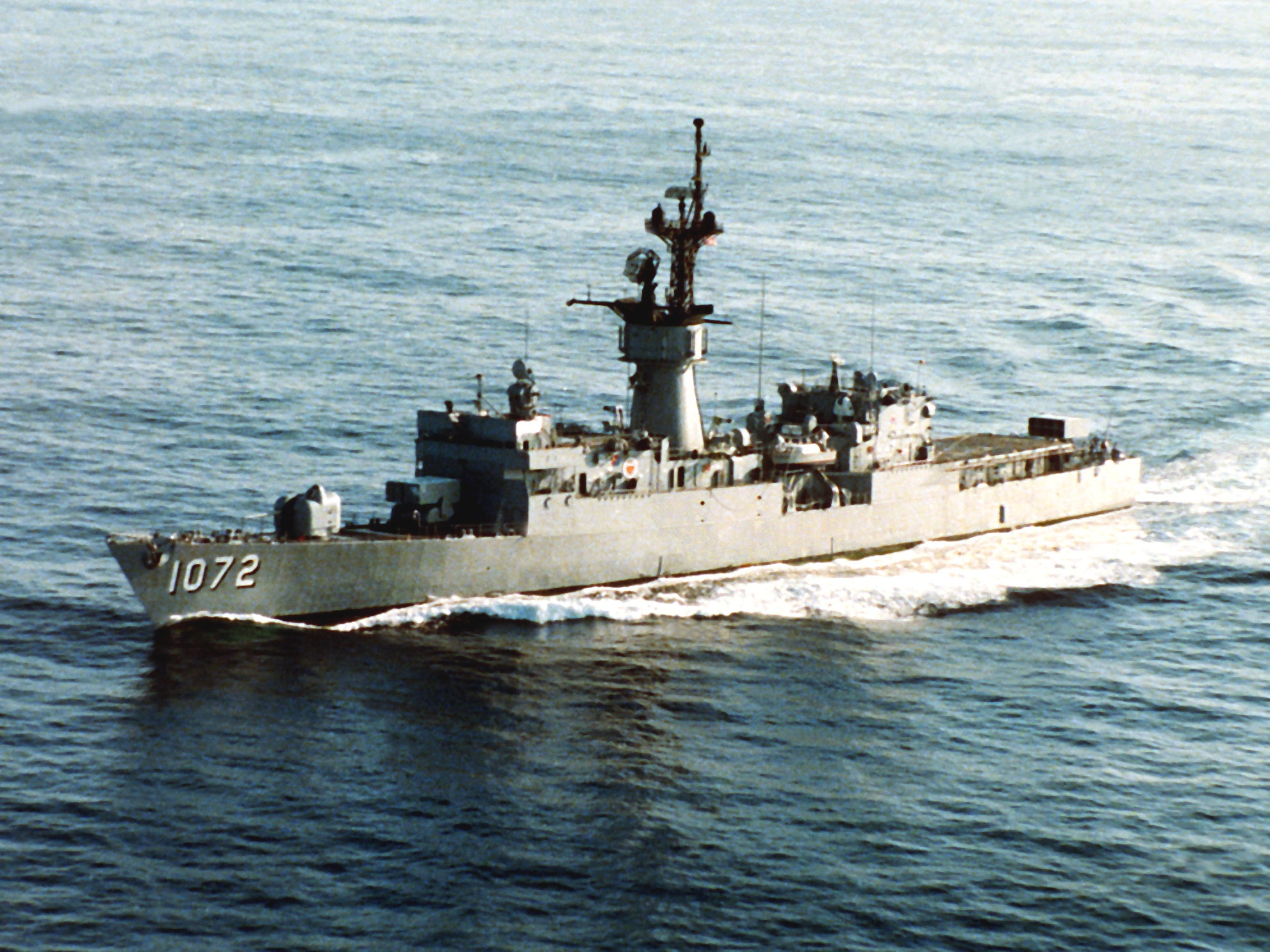
- USS Blakely (FF-1072)

History

United States
- Name: Blakely
- Ordered: 22 July 1964
- Builder: Avondale Shipyard, Westwego, Louisiana
- Laid down: 3 June 1968
- Launched: 23 August 1969
- Acquired: 2 July 1970
- Commissioned: 18 July 1970
- Decommissioned: 15 November 1991
- Stricken: 11 January 1995
- Motto: Nunquam Non Paratus; Never Unprepared
- Fate: Disposed of by scrapping, dismantling, 30 September 2000

General characteristics
- Class & type: Knox-class frigate
- Displacement: 3,243 tons (4,181 full load)
- Length: 438 ft (134 m)
- Beam: 46 ft 9 in (14.25 m)
- Draft: 24 ft 9 in (7.54 m)
- Propulsion: 2 × CE 1200psi boilers; 1 Westinghouse geared turbine; 1 shaft, 35,000 shp (26,000 kW)
- Speed: over 27 knots (50 km/h)
- Range: 4,500 nmi (8,300 km) at 20 knots (37 km/h)
- Complement: 18 officers, 267 enlisted
- Sensors & processing systems: AN/SPS-40 Air Search Radar; AN/SPS-67 Surface Search Radar; AN/SQS-26 Sonar; AN/SQR-18 Towed array sonar system; Mk68 Gun Fire Control System
- Electronic warfare & decoys: AN/SLQ-32 Electronics Warfare System
- Armament: one Mk-16 8 cell missile launcher for RUR-5 ASROC and Harpoon missiles; one Mk-42 5-inch/54 caliber gun; Mark 46 torpedoes from four single tube launchers); one Mk-25 BPDMS launcher for Sea Sparrow missiles, replaced by Phalanx CIWS
- Aircraft carried: one SH-2 Seasprite (LAMPS I) helicopter

The third USS Blakely (DE-1072/FF-1072) was a Knox-class destroyer escort in the United States Navy. She was reclassified as a frigate in 1975 along with her entire class. Her primary mission of ASW remained unchanged. She was named for Captain Johnston Blakeley and Vice Admiral Charles Adams Blakely. She was primarily stationed out of Charleston, South Carolina.

Blakely was laid down on 8 June 1968 at Westwego, Louisiana by Avondale Shipyards. She was launched on 23 August 1969; sponsored by Mrs. Lila Blakely Morgan, daughter of the late Vice Admiral Blakely, and delivered to the Navy on 1 July at the Charleston Naval Shipyard. She was commissioned there on 18 July 1970.

== Operational history ==
=== 1970s ===
Blakely spent the remainder of the year fitting out, conducting post-commissioning trials, and making her shakedown cruise. After a leave and upkeep period lasting from 12 December 1970 to 21 February 1971, she entered the Charleston Naval Shipyard on 22 February for post-shakedown availability. During that extended repair period, her Sea Sparrow basic point defense surface missile system launcher was installed. She completed post-shakedown repairs and modifications as well as final contract trials on 4 August.

Between 4 and 11 August, the ocean escort made a round-trip voyage to the Atlantic Fleet Weapons Range for missile and gunfire qualification. The warship returned to Charleston on 11 August and, on the 23d got underway for a voyage—via Newfoundland—to northern Europe. During that cruise, she visited ports in Norway, Denmark, Germany, and France.

She returned to Charleston on 3 October and began normal duty as a unit of the 2d Fleet. Her 2d Fleet service occupied her during the remainder of 1971 and 11 months of 1972. During that time, Blakely conducted type training, individual ship's drills, and fleet exercises along the eastern seaboard and in the West Indies.

==== Service during the Vietnam War (1972–1973) ====
On 1 December 1972, the ocean escort got underway from Charleston bound for the western Pacific. Steaming via the Panama Canal and Pearl Harbor in Hawaii, she arrived at Subic Bay in the Philippines on 7 January 1973. Five days later, the warship departed Subic Bay for the Vietnamese combat zone. Her tour of duty in the Far East came at the very end of American participation in the Vietnam War; and, as a consequence, she served only once in the combat zone. That service took place on the northern sea-air rescue station in the Gulf of Tonkin. Blakely concluded that assignment and arrived at Kaohsiung, Talwan, on 5 February.

==== Return to Charleston and modification (1973) ====
Following a fortnight there, she got underway on the 19th to return to Charleston. After calls at Hong Kong, Yokosuka in Japan, San Diego, and Panama, she arrived back at Charleston on 23 March. After post-deployment standdown, the warship resumed normal operations out of Charleston. That duty continued until 27 June when she entered the Charleston Naval Shipyard for a restricted availability.

Over the next five months, she underwent two major modifications. Her main propulsion plant was converted to use Navy distillate fuel, and the light airborne multipurpose system (LAMPS) was installed. She completed the restricted availability on 28 November and spent the remainder of the year preparing for refresher training.

==== West Indies, 2d Fleet duty (1974) ====
On 12 January 1974, Blakely departed Charleston for refresher training in the West Indies. That training—including missile shoots, torpedo launchings, and gunfire support drills—lasted until 7 March at which time she returned to Charleston.

After a series of inspections and examinations, both in port and underway, the warship resumed normal 2d Fleet duty on 29 April when she got underway to participate in LantReadEx (Atlantic Fleet Readiness Exercise) 3-74. Blakely returned to Charleston from the readiness exercise on 8 May and began preparations for her first tour of duty with the 6th Fleet in the Mediterranean Sea.

==== Mediterranean, 6th Fleet duty (1974) ====
On 14 June, the ocean escort stood out of Charleston on her way to the Mediterranean. She arrived in Rota, Spain, on the 24th and relieved USS Davis.

On the 26th, she began operations with the 6th Fleet. In addition to the usual exercises and port visits, she took part in evacuation operations conducted at Cyprus in July after strife broke out between the Turkish and Greek factions on that island. In August, she resumed the usual 6th Fleet duty and remained so occupied until relieved by USS Blandy at Gibraltar on 23 November.

Two days later, the warship shaped a course back to the United States. Blakely arrived back in Charleston on 5 December and began a combination post deployment and holiday standdown.

==== Redesignation and overhaul (1975–1976) ====
She remained in port through the end of the first month of 1975. The warship got underway for the first time in 1975 on 18 February to conduct independent ship's exercises, to take part in carrier qualifications with John F. Kennedy, and to undergo an operational readiness inspection. The ocean escort returned to Charleston on 25 February and, thereafter, resumed normal operations from that base.

Blakely remained so occupied until 2 June, when she entered the Charleston Naval Shipyard for a restricted availability followed immediately by a regular overhaul. On 30 June 1975, Blakely was redesignated a frigate, and her hull number became FF 1072. The repair period lasted until the third month of 1976. She completed overhaul on 30 March 1976.

==== Post Redesignation and Europe (1976–1977) ====
Blakely next embarked upon post-overhaul trials and refresher training. Those tasks took her on an extended cruise in the West Indies, and she did not return to Charleston until 7 July. Operations out of Charleston-including a series of inspections and examinations-carried her through the year. In December, she also began preparations for another Mediterranean deployment.

On the morning of 15 January 1977, Blakely left Charleston and began her voyage to Europe. On 24 January, she arrived in Leixoes, Portugal, where she relieved USS Barney. For the next six months, she ranged the length and breadth of the "middle sea." In addition to the customary port calls, she participated in a series of national and multinational training exercises. She ended her tour of duty with the 6th Fleet on 20 July at Rota, Spain, where she was relieved by USS Connole.

Blakely departed Rota on the 22d and arrived in Charleston on 1 August. After a month of leave and upkeep and a tender availability, the frigate resumed 2d Fleet operations on 11 September. For the remainder of 1977, she performed normal duty along the east coast and in the West Indies.

==== Mediterranean (1978) ====
In mid-February 1978, the warship began preparations for another assignment to the Mediterranean. On 4 April, Blakely stood out of Charleston to join a Europe-bound task force built around USS Forrestal. She arrived in Rota on 14 April and relieved Blandy. On the 17th, she entered the Mediterranean proper and began her actual duty with the 6th Fleet. That service—which included a number of multinational training exercises as well as the usual port visits—took up her time for the next six months.

On 11 October, Blakely returned to Rota where she was relieved by Conyngham. Four days later, the frigate put to sea for the return voyage to Charleston where she arrived on the 26th. Post-deployment leave and upkeep as well as two Destroyer Squadron (DesRon) 4 inspections kept her in port until the beginning of December. She got underway on the 4th and conducted training missions along the southeastern coast of the United States until the 15th. On that day, she returned to Charleston and commenced holiday standdown.

==== 2d Fleet, Boston home port, and repairs (1979) ====
She opened 1979 moored at pierside in her home port. Late in January, Blakely resumed operations with the 2d Fleet. For the next five months, she put to sea repeatedly—usually to participate in helicopter deck landing qualifications, but also to conduct naval gunfire support training and other single-ship exercises.

On 29 May, the frigate departed Charleston for Boston, Massachusetts. She arrived at her destination on 31 May. The following day, Boston became her new home port. On 4 June, the warship entered the drydock for a repair and modification period. On 4 October, she came out of the dock, but remained in Boston well into 1980 completing repairs.

=== 1980s ===
==== Return to Charleston (1980) ====
She completed the overhaul on 21 April 1980 and departed Boston to return to Charleston. That same day also brought an official change of home port, from Boston back to Charleston. She arrived at her familiar old base on the 24th and resumed operations along the east coast and in the West Indies. She remained so occupied for the rest of the year.

==== Middle East Force (1981) ====
The beginning of 1981 found her in port in Charleston preparing for an overseas movement. On 12 January 1981, Blakely got underway in company with Tattnall bound ultimately for duty with the Middle East Force in the Indian Ocean. She arrived in Rota on 23 January and, the next day, began crossing the Mediterranean. On the 31st, the warship transited the Suez Canal and joined the Middle East Force. For almost four months, she cruised the waters of the Indian Ocean, the Gulf of Aden, and the Persian Gulf helping to display the keen interest of the United States in establishing peace and order in that perennially troubled area of the world.

==== Return home, 2d Fleet (1981) ====
On 18 May, Bigelow relieved her, and Blakely began the long voyage back to Charleston. She retransited the Suez Canal on 26 May and proceeded to Málaga, Spain, where she stopped over from 1 to 7 June. After additional stops at Ponta Delgada in the Azores and at Bermuda, the frigate arrived in Charleston on 18 June. Following the normal leave and upkeep period, she resumed 2d Fleet operations on 21 July.

== Decommission and Fate ==
The ship was decommissioned on 15 November 1991 and struck from the Navy list on 11 January 1995.

She was disposed of by scrapping on 30 September 2000.
