= HMS Avon (1805) =

Brig-sloop of the Royal Navy

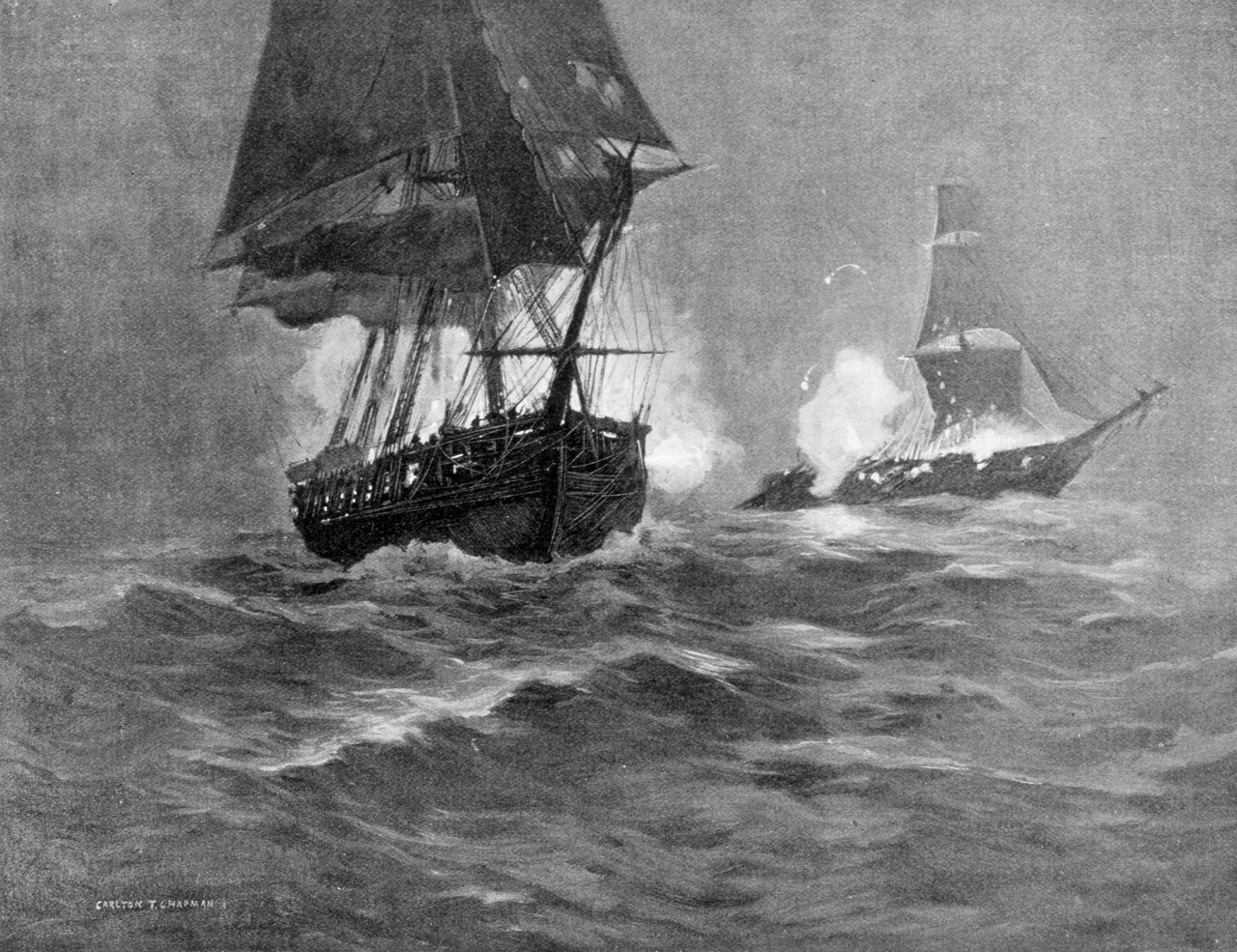
- 1896 illustration of Avon (right) engaging USS Wasp by Carlton T. Chapman

History

United Kingdom
- Name: HMS Avon
- Ordered: 9 December 1803
- Builder: Symons of Falmouth
- Launched: 31 January 1805
- Fate: Captured, abandoned and sunk 27 August 1814

General characteristics
- Class & type: Cruizer-class brig-sloop
- Tons burthen: 38241/94 bm
- Length: 100 ft 0 in (30.5 m) (gundeck); 77 ft 3 1/2 in (23.6 m) (keel)
- Beam: 30 ft 6 in (9.3 m)
- Depth of hold: 12 ft 9 in (3.9 m)
- Sail plan: Brig rigged
- Complement: 121
- Armament: 16 × 32-pounder carronades + 2 × 6-pounder bow guns

HMS Avon was an 18-gun Cruizer-class brig-sloop of the Royal Navy built at Falmouth, Cornwall and launched in 1805. In the War of 1812 she fought a desperate action with USS Wasp that resulted in Avon sinking on 27 August 1814.

== Service ==
Avon entered service at Spithead under the command of Commander Francis J. Snell and sailed for the Mediterranean on 18 April 1805. On 7 May she captured Frisken. By 9 May Avon was off Lisbon, where the schooner Milbrook reported to Snell her capture of the Spanish privateer lugger Travella, of three guns and 40 men, off the Bayona Islands (Baiona), and the recapture of the British brig Stork. Then on 20 January 1806, Avon was present when Pomone recaptured Maid of the Mill.

In March 1806 Avon briefly came under the command of Commander James Stewart and was tasked with convoying and cruising duties. In May, Commander Mauritius Adolphus Newton De Stark assumed command and sailed Avon in the Channel. Shortly thereafter, he was assigned the responsibility of escorting the Russian vessel Neva to the Baltic, as it was returning from a voyage of discovery. Given the onset of hostilities between Napoleon and Russia, the British government deemed an escort to be a prudent precaution. In recognition of his services, the Tsar presented de Stark with a breakfast service of plate and a purse containing 100 guineas.

Avon sailed for North America on 28 August. She was carrying Mr Erskine, HM Minister to the United States. On the way to the United States, Avon encountered the French 74-gun Regulus, which gave chase for eight hours, firing constantly, before de Stark was able to lose her in a squall. Avon arrived at Annapolis Royal on 30 October. On his return voyage he met up with a Royal Navy 74-gun ship with orders to go to Bermuda and then to take to Britain despatches from French Admiral Willaumez that Avon had taken from an American vessel she had examined on her way out of the Chesapeake. Avon arrived at Spithead on 7 January 1807.

In January 1807 Commander Thomas Thrush took command and sailed Avon to Jamaica on 16 April. (He had been appointed to her in September 1806 but had had to await her return.) During her time on the Jamaica station lightning struck Avon, damaging her badly, but fortunately causing no deaths. Thrush also had the opportunity to take Avon to Cartagena to pick up a freight of dollars; his commission on the transport when he delivered it to Britain was £2,056. (Note: At the time, Royal Navy captains were authorized to carry specie for merchants. For this safe-keeping service the consignor paid them a commission of about half a per cent, a commission the captain did not share with his officers or crew.) On 1 May 1809 he was promoted to post-captain and removed to Garland.

In June 1809 Commander Henry Fraser took command. On 15 March 1810, the 28-gun Rainbow, under James Woolbridge, and Avon encountered the French frigate Néréide, under the command of Jean-François Lemaresquier. Lemaresquier fled to separate the two British ships, but stopped to engage Rainbow after Avon had fallen back. He soon had reduced Rainbow to a battered state, but Avon resolutely came in support and put a 30-minute fight against the much stronger Néréide before herself retreating. Damage on Néréide prevented her from giving chase. Lemaresquier therefore continued on his course, reaching Brest on 30 March. By 1812 Avon was back at Portsmouth.

Commander George Sartorious took command on 22 July 1813 and Avon served on the Cork Station. She underwent repairs at Portsmouth in November. Sartorious left her in June 1814 on his promotion to post-captain, and Commander the Honourable James Arbuthnot recommissioned her in July.

== Sinking by USS Wasp ==
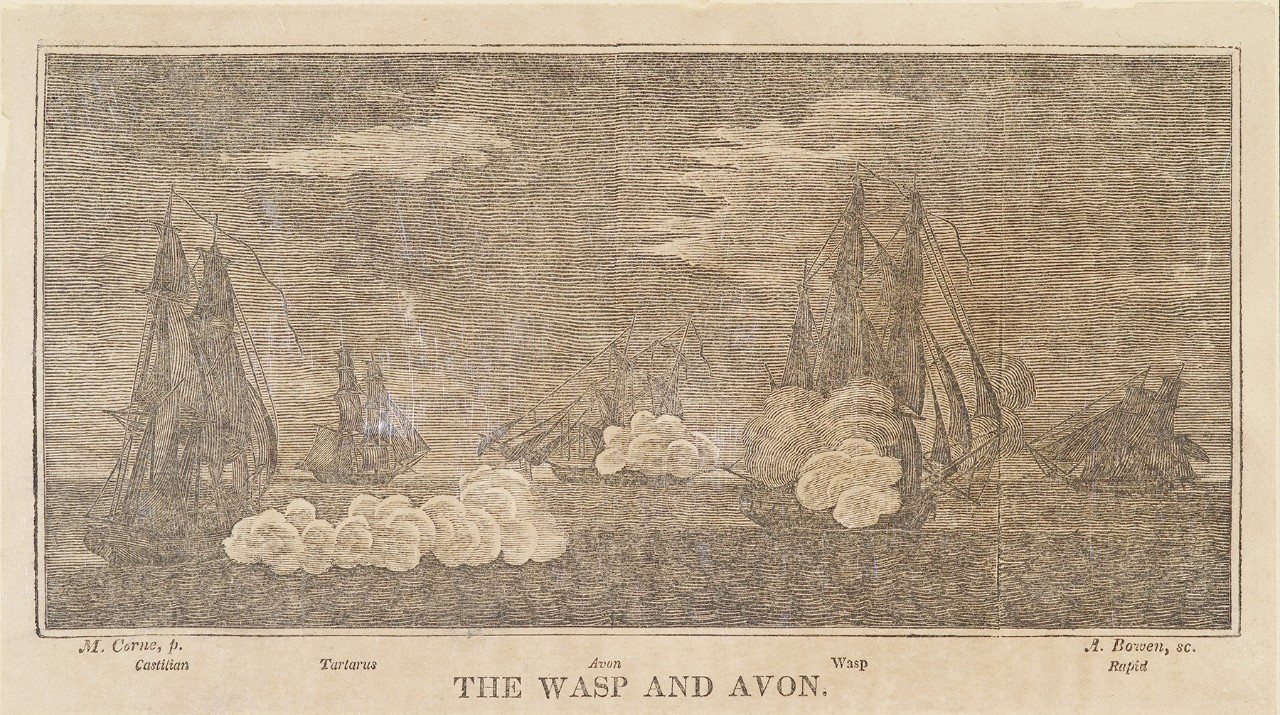
1815 engraving of Avon engaging Wasp by Abel Bowen after a Michele Felice Cornè painting

On 1 September 1814, Tartarus, Castilian, and Avon recaptured Atlantic. (Note: The salvage money for each of the British captains was £125 1s; for an ordinary seaman it was £2 16s 9¼, an amount about equal to their wages for a month and a half.)

That evening Avon encountered the United States Navy ship-rigged sloop of war Wasp in the English Channel. Wasp spotted Avon's sail on the horizon and gave chase. By 9:30pm, Wasp had Avon under her lee bow and opened fire. Avon returned fire until 10pm, at which time her guns, according to the crew of Wasp, fell silent. Wasp then ceased fire and called for Avon to surrender, but Avon answered with another cannonade. Wasp returned fire. Some broadsides later, Avon's guns fell silent once more and Wasp again called for surrender. Avon, by now a battered hulk, had no choice but to concede.

Just as Wasp began to lower the boat for the prize crew to go aboard Avon, Wasp's lookout sighted another British brig sailing toward Wasp and Avon. Wasp's crew manned their battle stations immediately in hope of taking the newcomer, the 18-gun Castilian, as well. Just then, two more British ships appeared on the horizon. Wasp therefore sailed away, abandoning Avon.

Although the Americans didn't know it at the time, Avon sank at 1am, soon after Wasp left her. She had lost ten men killed and 29 wounded in the action. Castillian rescued the survivors from Avon.
