= Edwin Hayes =

English painter (1819–1904)

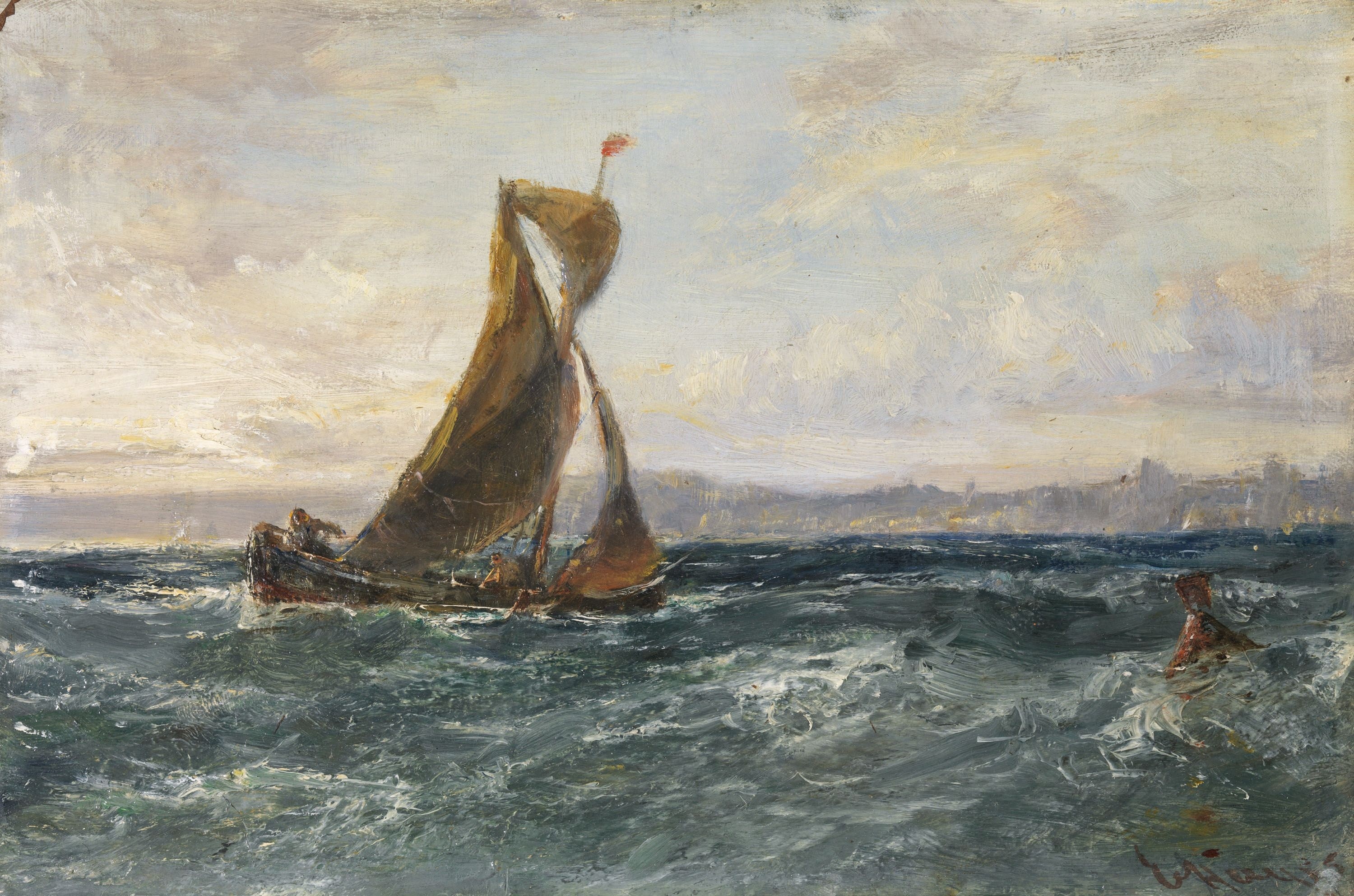
Edwin Hayes, A view of Dublin Bay, National Gallery of Ireland, a typical subject

Edwin Hayes, RI (7 June 1819 – 7 November 1904) was an English painter who specialised in marine art.

== Life and works ==
Hayes was born in Bristol, England, but brought up in Dublin, Ireland, where his father was a hotelier. He studied art at the Dublin Society Art School and first exhibited his work at the RHA (Royal Hibernian Academy) in 1842. After serving as a seaman on a ship sailing to America, he remained in Dublin for ten years before moving to London in 1852. He painted scenery at the Adelphi Theatre and other London theatres, a common employment for young artists. He also exhibited at the Royal Academy of Arts, British Institution, Society of British Artists and the Royal Institute of Painters in Watercolours, becoming a full member of the latter in 1863.

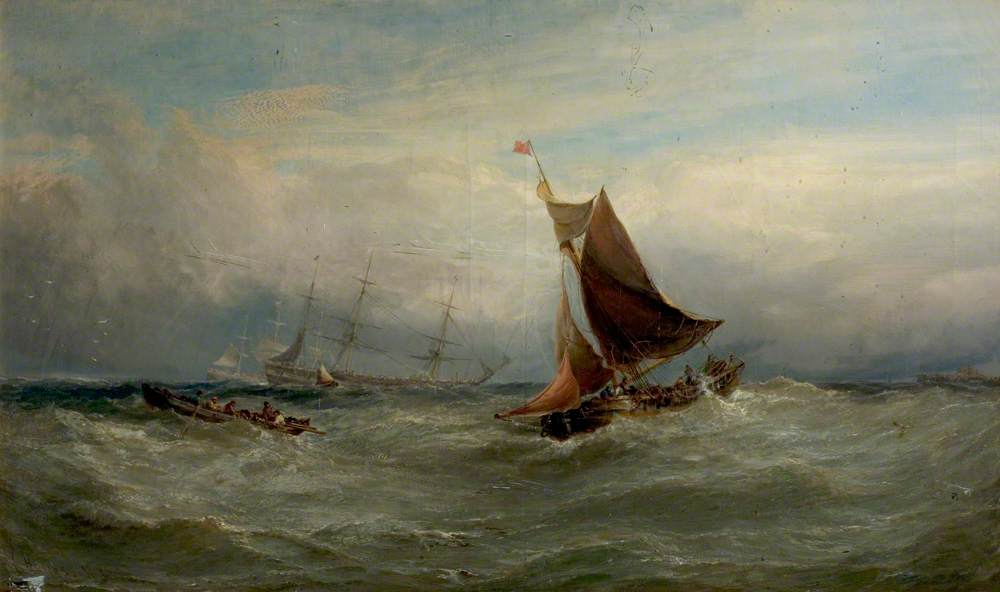
Boats in a Gale off Ostend, Belgium, 1875, Nottingham Museums

Hayes painted seascapes in Ireland, England, Belgium, Holland, France, Spain and Italy, his work almost invariably featuring ships and boats in high seas, harbour scenes or beach or shoreline subjects, all most often from the south coast of England. Huon Mallalieu says he "has an accurate eye for detail, and is traditional in manner". Hayes died on 7 November 1904 in London.

His son Claude Hayes, R.I., ROI, (1852–1922) was also a notable landscapist, latterly mostly in watercolour.

A painting by Hayes was featured and restored in a 2021 episode of the BBC Television programme The Repair Shop.
