= John Clymer =

American painter (1907–1989)

- Born: John Ford Clymer; January 29, 1907; Ellensburg, Washington, U.S.
- Died: November 2, 1989 (aged 82); Bellevue, Washington, U.S.
- Education: Art Instruction School
- Occupation: Artist

John Ford Clymer RCA (January 29, 1907 – November 2, 1989) was an American painter and illustrator known for his paintings and illustrations, often featuring the American West.

== Early life and education ==
Born in Ellensburg, Washington, Clymer first studied art through an Art Instruction School correspondence course.

== Career ==
Clymer continued to study art in Canada, where he attended the Vancouver School of Art (now Emily Carr University) and the Ontario College of Art and Design's summer school. He spent eight years illustrating for Canadian magazines.

In Westport, Connecticut, Clymer continued his studies under N.C. Wyeth and the painter and teacher Harvey Dunn and established his career as an illustrator for American magazines, including Argosy, The Saturday Evening Post, Woman's Day and Field and Stream. Clymer created over eighty covers for The Saturday Evening Post.

While in the Marine Corps, he illustrated for Leatherneck Magazine and the Marine Corps Gazette. His work in advertising included paintings for White Horse Scotch Whisky, the Pennsylvania Railroad and the Chrysler Corporation.

John Clymer cover for Woman's Day (December 1942)

He also made easel paintings of cowboy life and portrayed the history of the American West.

== Awards ==
In 1976, Clymer received the Prix de West from the Academy of Western Art. His oils and charcoal drawings earned him awards from the Cowboy Artists of America. He was named Western Artist of the Year by the National Wildlife Art Collectors Society. In 1988, he was awarded the Rungius Medal from the National Museum of Wildlife Art for his painting Late Arrivals, Green River Rendezvous. He was made a member of the Royal Canadian Academy of Arts.

His work is on permanent exhibit at the Clymer Museum of Art, located at 416 North Pearl Street in Ellensburg, Washington.

== Personal life ==
In 1932, he married his childhood sweetheart, and in the fall of 1937, the couple moved to Westport, Connecticut. Clymer died on November 2, 1989, in Bellevue, Washington.
