= Charles Adams Blakely =

United States Navy officer

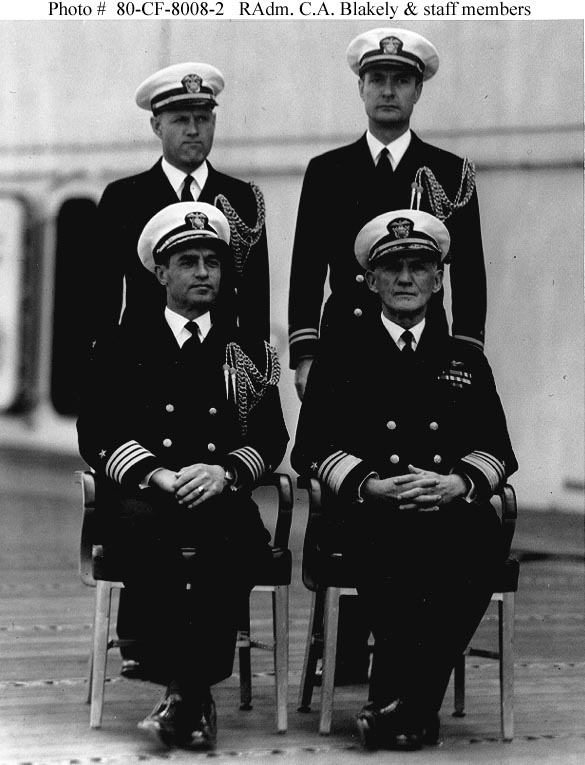
- Born: October 1, 1879; Williamsburg, Kentucky, U.S.
- Died: September 12, 1950 (aged 70); San Diego, California, U.S.
- Military career
- Allegiance: United States
- Branch: United States Navy
- Service years: 1899–1942
- Rank: Vice Admiral
- Commands: USS Thornton; USS Macdonough; USS Atlanta; USS Rowan; USS O'Brien; USS Texas; USS Lexington; Carrier Division 2
- Conflicts: Spanish–American War; World War I World War II
- Awards: Distinguished Service Medal

Vice Admiral Charles Adams Blakely (1 October 1879 – 12 September 1950) was an officer in the United States Navy during World War I and the interwar period.

== Biography ==
Born on October 1, 1879, at Williamsburg, Kentucky, Blakely graduated from Williamsburg Academy in 1897 and, in the summer of 1898, served with the 2d Kentucky Volunteer Infantry during the Spanish–American War. Appointed a naval cadet in September 1899, Blakely graduated from the Naval Academy on February 2, 1903, and, after serving two years at sea as a passed naval cadet, was commissioned ensign in 1905 to date from February 3.

== Career in surface ships ==
Between 1903 and 1907, he served successively in the frigate Santee, Baltimore (Cruiser No. 3), Cleveland (Cruiser No. 19), Denver (Cruiser No. 14), and the yacht Mayflower. Command of Thornton (Torpedo Boat No. 33) and Macdonough (Torpedo-boat Destroyer No. 9) followed. In December 1910, he became officer in charge of the machinist school at the Charleston Navy Yard. Between June 1911 and October 1914, Blakely commanded the Reserve Torpedo Flotillas and the protected cruiser Atlanta. From October 1914 to September 1916, he served ashore at the New York Navy Yard. At the end of that assignment, he assumed command of Rowan (Destroyer No. 64).

During World War I, Blakely commanded O'Brien (Destroyer No. 51), serving in the waters surrounding the British Isles.

At the end of the war, he went to Washington where he served in the Office of the Chief of Naval Operations. In December 1920, Blakely became the engineering officer on the staff of the Commander, Destroyer Squadrons, Atlantic Fleet. He concluded that assignment in October 1922 and moved to duty as inspector of ordnance at the Naval Ammunition Depot, Lake Denmark, New Jersey. In 1925, he began a year as commanding officer of the battleship Texas (BB-35). Leaving that billet in August 1926, Blakely embarked upon a two-year tour of duty commanding the Destroyer Squadron, Asiatic Fleet. In July 1928, he returned to the United States to take up duty in the Bureau of Navigation as president of the Naval Reserve Inspection Board.

== Belated aviation career ==
Blakely remained at the Bureau of Navigation for more than three years. He was relieved in December 1931 and, in January 1932, reported for duty at the Naval Air Station Pensacola, Florida, as a student. Upon completion of the observer course in May 1932, he was designated an aviation observer. During that same month, Blakely assumed command of the aircraft carrier Lexington (CV-2), a unit of the Battle Force based on the west coast. In June 1934, he relinquished command of the aircraft carrier and proceeded to Newport, Rhode Island, where he spent the next 12 months completing the senior course at the Naval War College. Blakely returned to Pensacola in June 1935 to take additional flight training. On March 10, 1936, at the age of 54, he received his designation as a naval aviator. Two months later, he became commanding officer of the Pensacola facility.

Rear Admiral Blakely was detached from duty at Pensacola late in the summer of 1937. In August of that year, he became Commander, Carrier Division 2, and presided over that organization until the end of the year, ultimately flying his flag in Yorktown (CV-5). In January 1938, he fleeted up to Commander Aircraft, Scouting Force, a post he held for the next 18 months. In June 1939, Blakely moved back to the west coast assuming concurrent command of Aircraft, Battle Force, and of CarDiv 2 with the rank of Vice Admiral. Once again he wore his flag in Yorktown. Blakely's last active assignment was Commandant, 11th Naval District, with additional duty as the Commanding Officer, Naval Operating Base, San Diego.

== Retirement and passing ==
Ill health brought his relief from active duty on December 9, 1941, and, on October 1, 1942, his transfer to the retired list.

He died on 12 September 1950, in San Diego.

== Namesake ==
USS Blakely (DE-1072/FF-1072) was named in honor of both him and Capt. Johnston Blakeley. Unfortunately Admiral Blakely claimed to be a nephew of Johnston Blakeley. However, Johnston Blakeley had no siblings who survived to adulthood. Therefore, it is not possible for anyone to be a nephew or grandnephew of Johnston Blakeley.
