= Naval warfare during the War of 1812 =

Naval warfare during the War of 1812 in North America proved decisive not because the United States rivalled the United Kingdom of Great Britain and Ireland global sea power, but because control of specific maritime and inland waters shaped military campaigns, territorial security and diplomacy. Great Britain retained overwhelming naval supremacy on the world's oceans; however, American success in selected local theatres, most notably on the Great Lakes, directly influenced the outcome of the War of 1812 on land and constrained British negotiating leverage at the peace table. Historians increasingly emphasize that the war's naval dimension must be understood regionally rather than globally.

== Ships of the War of 1812 ==
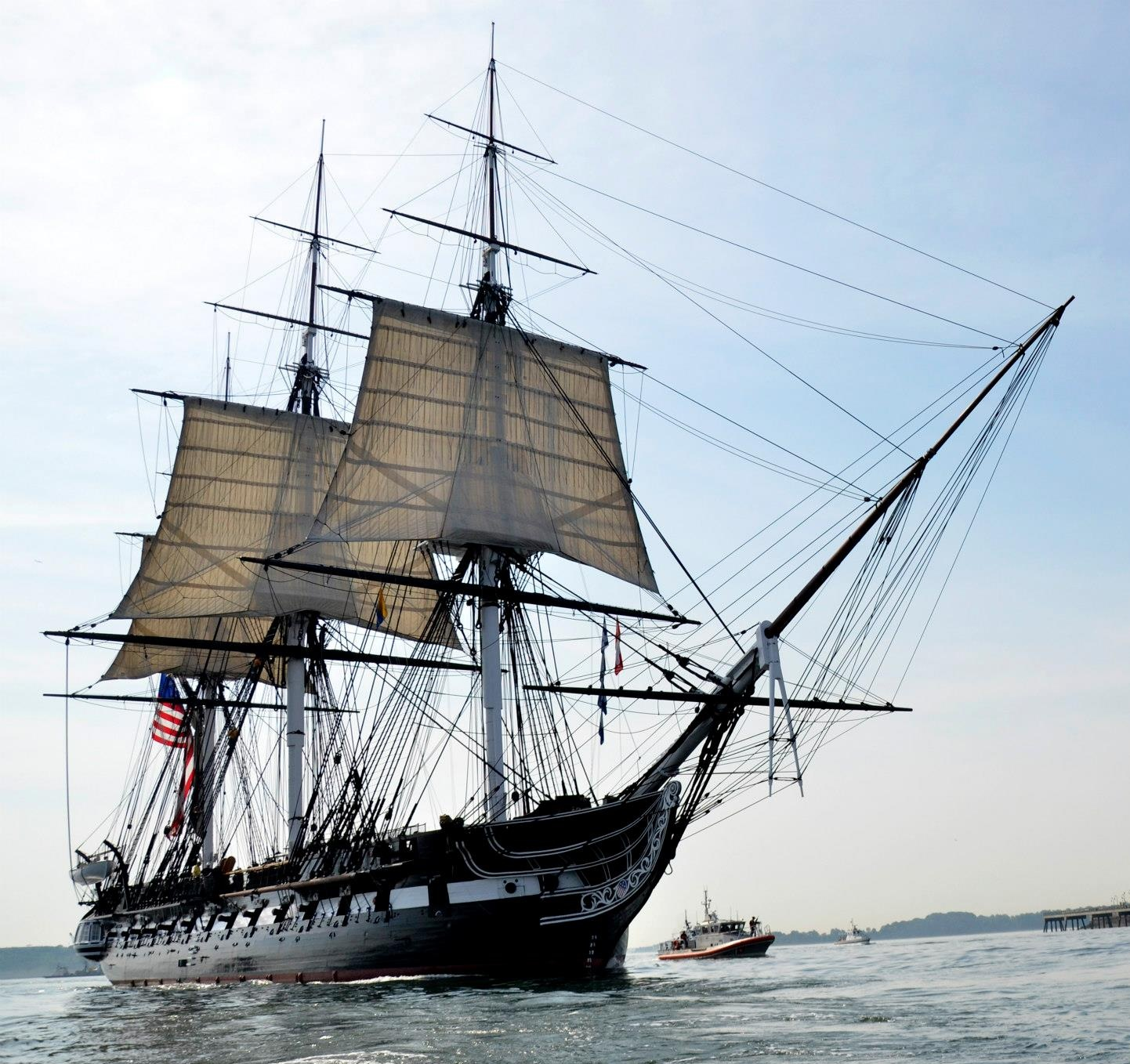
USS Constitution a super-heavy frigate

During the War of 1812, several distinct types of sailing warships played vital roles in naval operations on the oceans, rivers and Great Lakes, each suited to specific strategic and tactical purposes. Brigs were two-masted, square-rigged vessels carrying roughly 10–20 guns. Fast and manoeuvrable, they served as couriers, patrol vessels, and training ships, and proved especially effective on the Great Lakes, where American brigs gained notable success. Ships of the line were the largest and most powerful warships of the era, mounting between 60 and 110 guns and designed to fight in formal battle lines. While dominant on the high seas, they were too large for most inland waters and played little direct role on the Great Lakes during the war. Schooners were among the most versatile vessels, prized for their ability to sail close to the wind. Common on Lake Ontario, they were widely used as transports, supply vessels and privateers. Their shallow draft and handling made them ideal for inland waterways. Frigates were large, fast, three-masted ships carrying lighter armament than ships of the line, typically around 28 guns. They were central to Atlantic warfare, used for patrolling, commerce raiding and escort, which became symbols of naval prestige. Sloop-of-war, smaller than frigates but often heavily armed, were employed to counter privateers and perform independent duties. Their adaptability made them effective on both coastal waters and the Great Lakes, where they frequently served as flagships or escorts.

== Atlantic Ocean theatre of operations ==
On the Atlantic Ocean, early American victories in single ship frigate actions had an outsized psychological impact. The battle of USS Constitution vs HMS Guerriere in August 1812, followed by victories of USS United States vs HMS Macedonian and HMS Java, demonstrated that American heavy frigates larger, more heavily armed and better crewed than standard British frigates could defeat isolated Royal Navy opponents. These encounters challenged British naval prestige and boosted American morale at a moment when land campaigns were going poorly. Strategically, these victories did not alter British naval doctrine nor prevent the Royal Navy from tightening its blockade of the American coastline.

=== Atlantic naval actions ===
The naval battle of USS Essex vs HMS Alert occurred on 13 August 1812, with the American frigate USS Essex, commanded by Captain David Porter, encountered the British sloop HMS Alert in the Atlantic Ocean. After a brief engagement lasting only minutes, Alert struck her colours and was captured. This first American naval victory of the war provided an early morale boost and demonstrated United States offensive intent at sea.

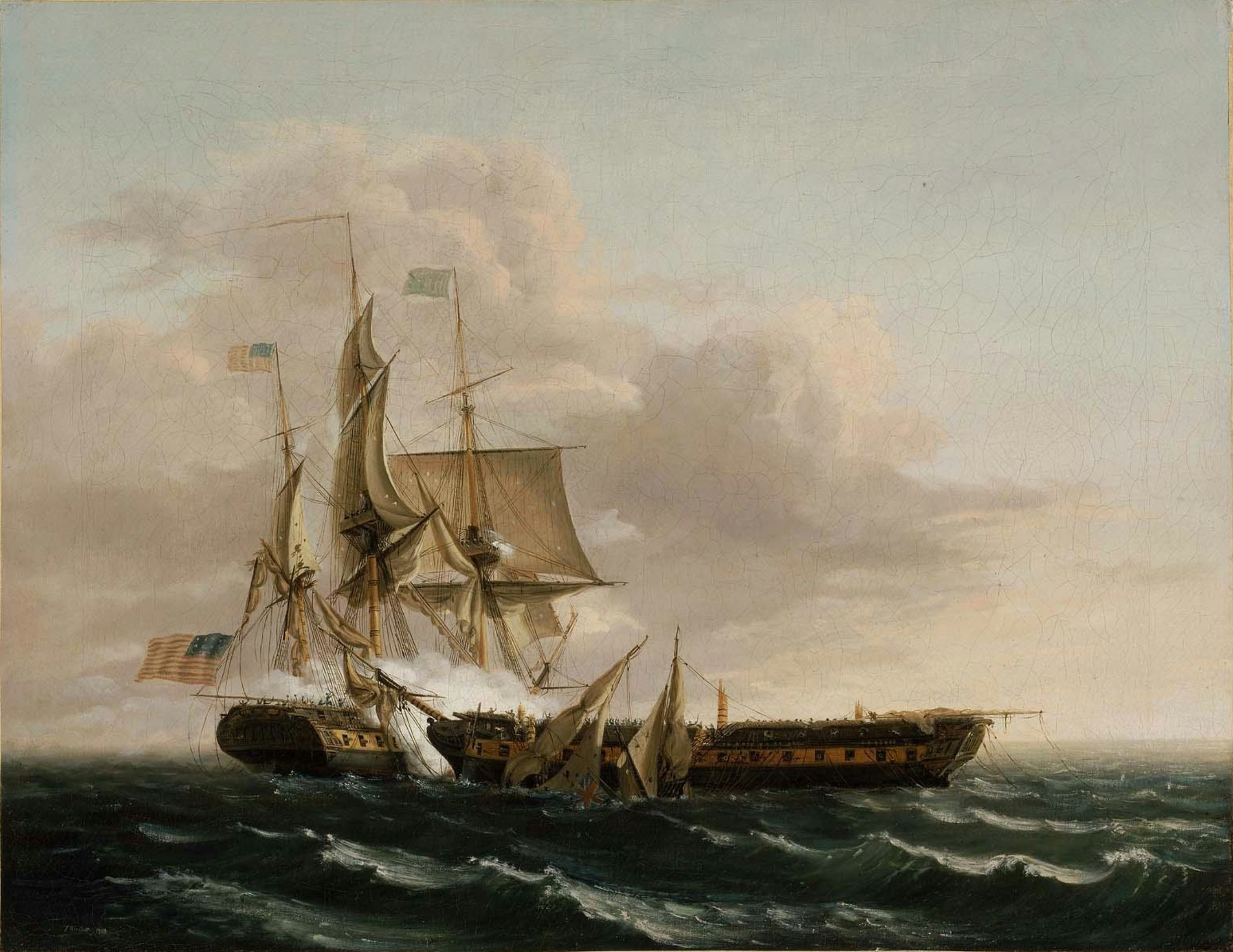
Engagement between Constitution and Guerrière, 1812

The battle of the USS Constitution vs HMS Guerriere on 19 August 1812, had USS Constitution under Captain Isaac Hull defeating HMS Guerriere in a dramatic frigate duel southeast of Halifax, Nova Scotia. Guerriere was dismasted and later burned. The victory gave rise to the nickname "Old Ironsides" for Constitution and shattered assumptions about British naval invincibility.

The capture of HMS Frolic on 18 October 1812, had USS Wasp, commanded by Jacob Jones, fought and captured HMS Frolic after a fierce close-range battle. Although both vessels were later captured by a larger British ship, the action highlighted American gunnery skill and further strengthened United States confidence during the war's opening months.

The battle of USS United States vs HMS Macedonian on 25 October 1812, had USS United States, commanded by Stephen Decatur, capturing HMS Macedonian after a long-range engagement near Madeira. The British frigate was badly damaged and taken into American service. This marked the first time a British warship was brought into a United States port.

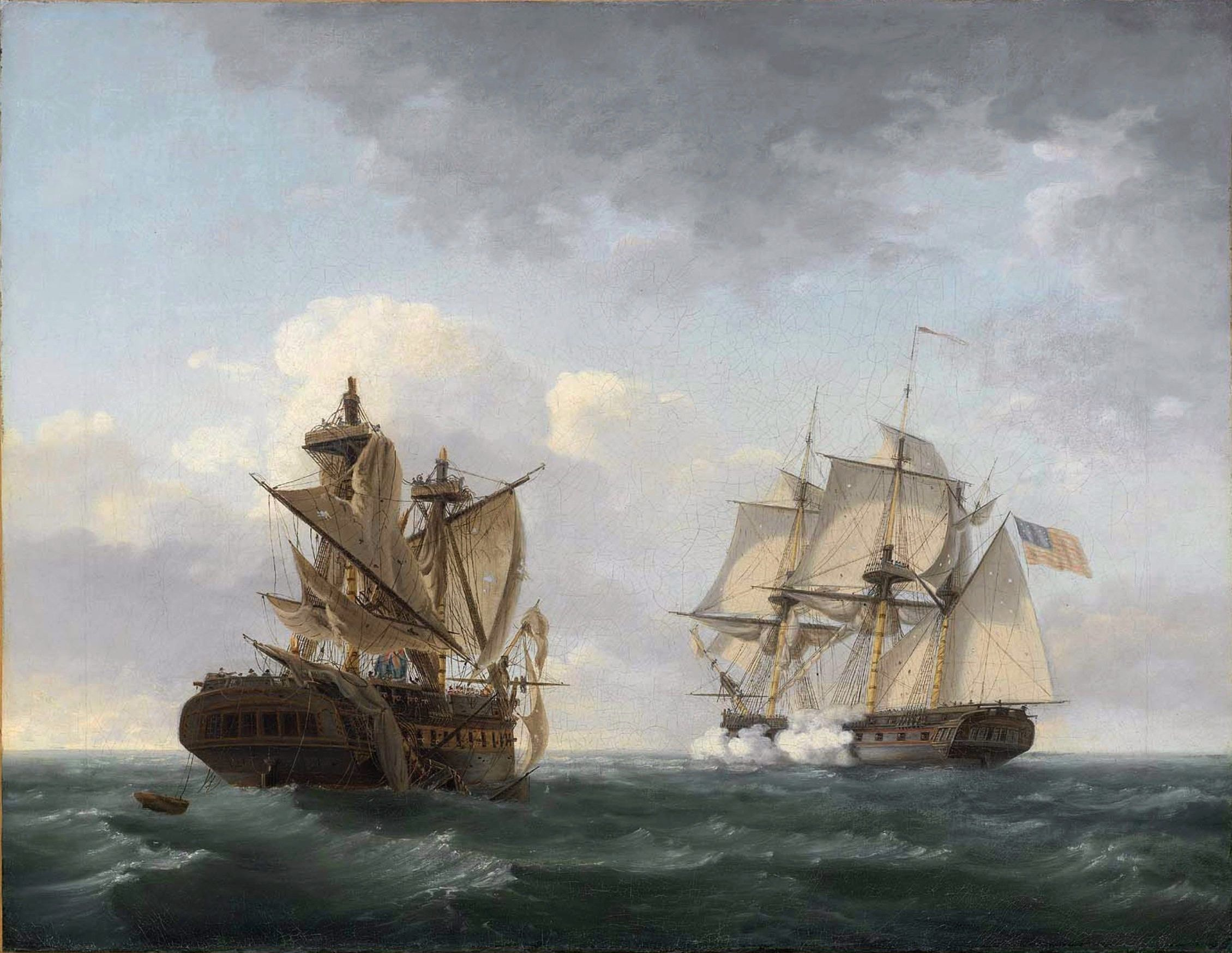
Engagement between USS United States and HMS Macedonian, 1812

The battle of USS Constitution vs HMS Java on 29 December 1812, had USS Constitution under William Bainbridge defeating the HMS Java off the coast of Brazil. After a hard-fought action, Java was rendered unsalvageable and destroyed. The loss prompted the Royal Navy to restrict single-ship frigate engagements with American vessels.

The sinking of HMS Peacock on 24 February 1813, had USS Hornet, commanded by James Lawrence, engaging HMS Peacock off the coast of South America. The British vessel was sunk shortly after surrendering, killing her captain. Despite the controversy over the sinking, the action reinforced American naval prestige.

The Battle of Rappahannock River on 3 April 1813, had British naval forces conducting a successful cutting-out expedition up the Rappahannock River in Virginia. Using boats, they captured or destroyed several American schooners and privateers, eliminating a local threat and reinforcing British control during the Chesapeake campaign.

The capture of USS Chesapeake on 1 June 1813, had HMS Shannon, commanded by Philip Broke, defeating and capturing USS Chesapeake outside Boston Harbour. The engagement was brief but brutal, resulting in the death of American captain James Lawrence. The loss ended the streak of American frigate victories.

Shannon and Chesapeake, 1813

The capture of Young Teazer on 27 June 1813, had the American privateer schooner Young Teazer intercepted by a British warship in Mahone Bay, Nova Scotia. Rather than surrender, an explosion destroyed the vessel, killing most of her crew. The incident became one of the war's most tragic privateering episodes.

The capture of HMS Dominica on 5 August 1813, had the American privateer Decatur capturing HMS Dominica after a fierce engagement near Bermuda. Despite being smaller, the privateer boarded and overwhelmed the British vessel, demonstrating the continued effectiveness of American privateering operations.

The capture of USS Argus on 14 August 1813, had HMS Pelican capturing USS Argus near the British coast after a prolonged chase. The American commander was mortally wounded during the fight. The loss underscored the risks faced by United States commerce raiders operating close to Britain.

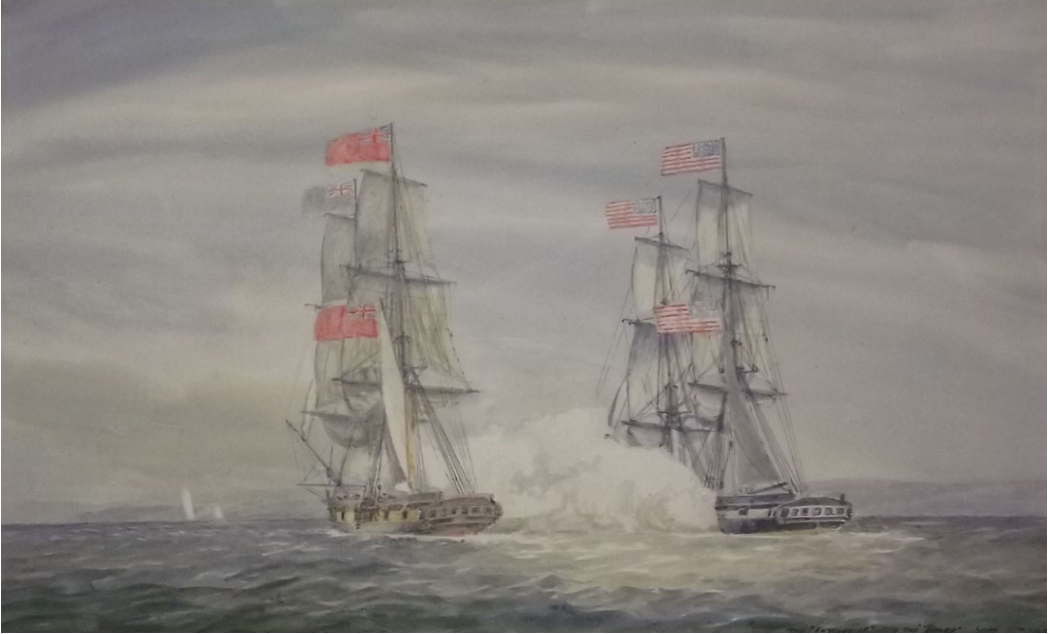
Enterprise and Boxer, 1813

The capture of HMS Boxer on 5 September 1813, had USS Enterprise defeating HMS Boxer off the coast of Maine. Both commanding officers were killed in the engagement. The battle ended with Boxer's capture and was notable for the mutual respect shown during the burial of both captains.

The capture of HMS Epervier on 29 April 1814, had USS Peacock capturing HMS Epervier off the Florida coast after a short but intense engagement. The British vessel was heavily damaged, and the prize included a valuable cargo of specie, making the victory financially and militarily significant.

The sinking of HMS Reindeer on 28 June 1814, had USS Wasp defeating HMS Reindeer in the English Channel. After heavy casualties on both sides, Reindeer surrendered and was later destroyed due to extensive damage. The action demonstrated American reach into European waters.

The sinking of HMS Avon on 1 September 1814, had USS Wasp engaging HMS Avon during a night action in the Atlantic Ocean. After sustained fire, Avon surrendered but later sank. The arrival of additional British ships forced Wasp to withdraw, preserving her own survival.

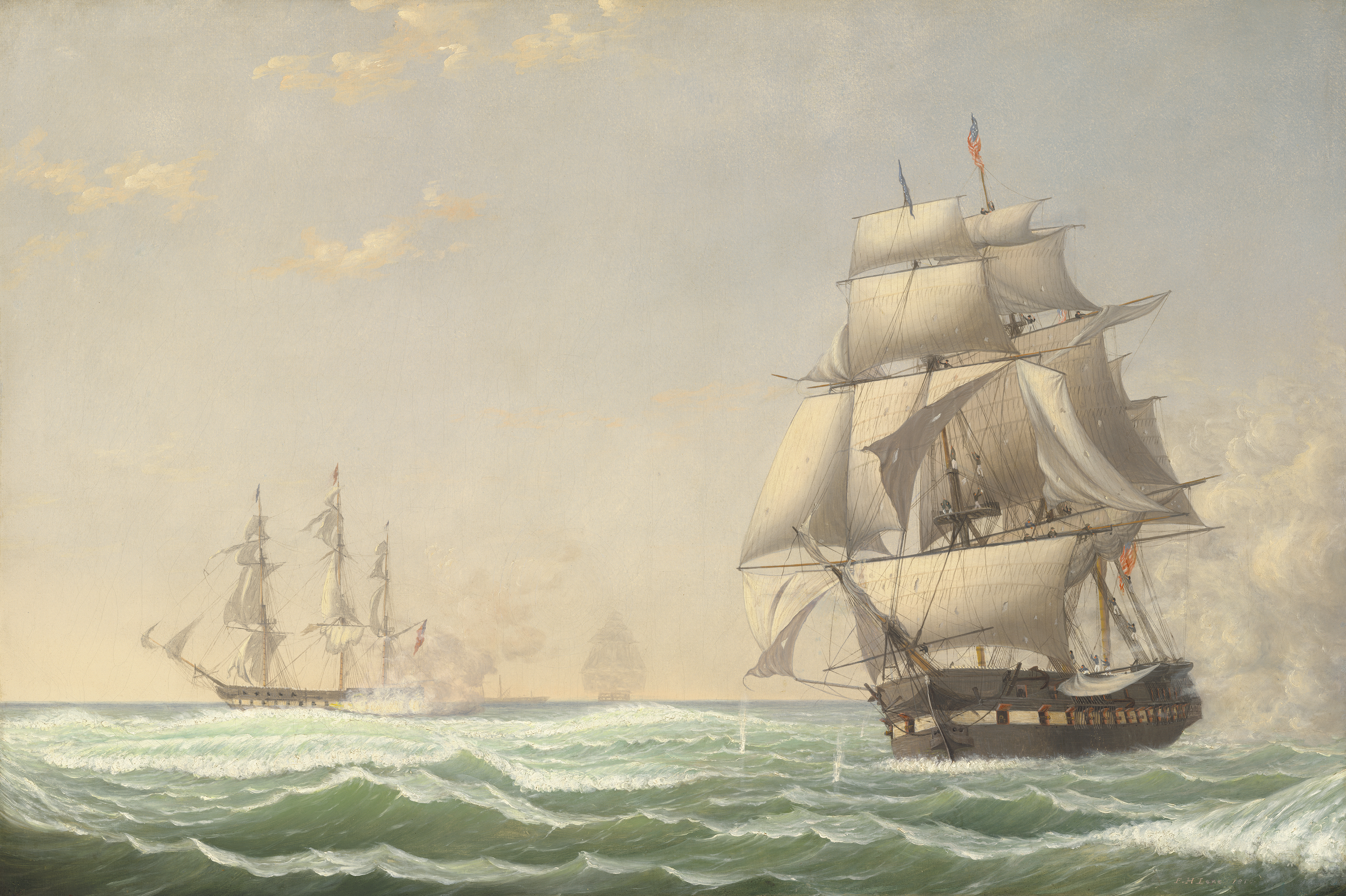
President engaging the British squadron, 1815

The capture of USS President on 15 January 1815, had USS President, commanded by Stephen Decatur, captured by a British squadron after attempting to escape blockade from New York Harbor. Severely damaged during the chase, the frigate struck her colours, marking a major late-war loss for the United States.

During the Battle of Fayal on or about 26–27 September 1814, the American privateer General Armstrong resisted the British cutting-out attacks in the neutral harbour of Faial Island. Night boat assaults were repulsed, but overwhelming force compelled scuttling of the ship. The action highlighted privateering, small-boat tactics and the diplomatic controversy over violated neutrality during the War of 1812

The capture of HMS Cyane and HMS Levant on 20 February 1815, had USS Constitution encountered by HMS Cyane and HMS Levant near Madeira. In a skillful engagement, the American frigate captured both vessels. The action occurred after the Treaty of Ghent had been signed, though news had not yet reached the ships.

The capture of HMS Penguin on 23 March 1815, had USS Hornet engage and capture HMS Penguin near Tristan da Cunha. The British vessel suffered heavy damage and was later destroyed. This engagement is generally regarded as the final naval action of the War of 1812.

==== East Coast naval actions ====
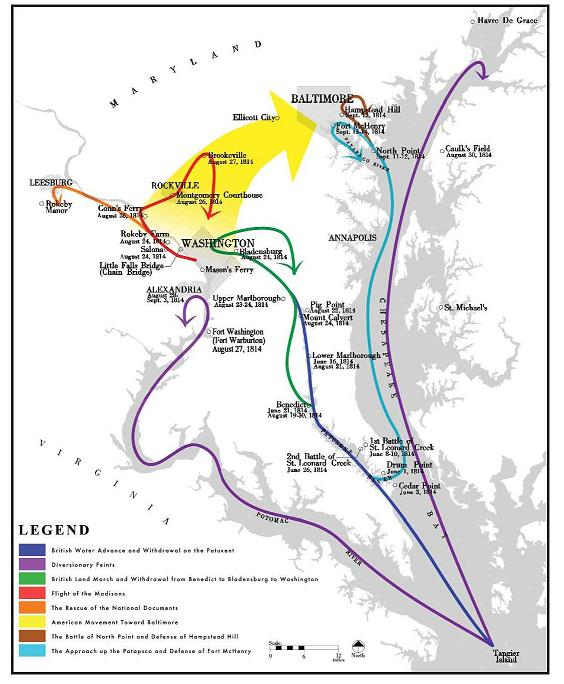
Chesapeake campaign, 1814

Naval operations along the East Coast of the United States during the War of 1812 formed a sustained campaign of blockade, coastal raiding and amphibious warfare conducted by the Royal Navy to exploit its overwhelming maritime superiority. By 1813, British naval forces had tightened their blockade of the American seaboard, disrupting trade and projecting power directly against coastal communities. Early demonstrations of this strategy included the bombardment of Lewes in April 1813, when British warships shelled the Delaware town after its refusal to supply the blockading squadron. Although the bombardment caused little physical damage, it illustrated British willingness to use naval firepower to coerce coastal populations and enforce blockade policy.

British naval pressure intensified dramatically in 1814 following the defeat of Napoleon, which freed experienced ships and crews for American operations. In August 1814, a Royal Navy flotilla ascended the Potomac River during the Raid on Alexandria, Virginia, compelling the town’s surrender and seizing merchant vessels, naval stores and supplies. This operation demonstrated British mastery of riverine navigation and their ability to strike deep inland using naval forces alone, though it diverted time and resources from the subsequent Baltimore campaign.

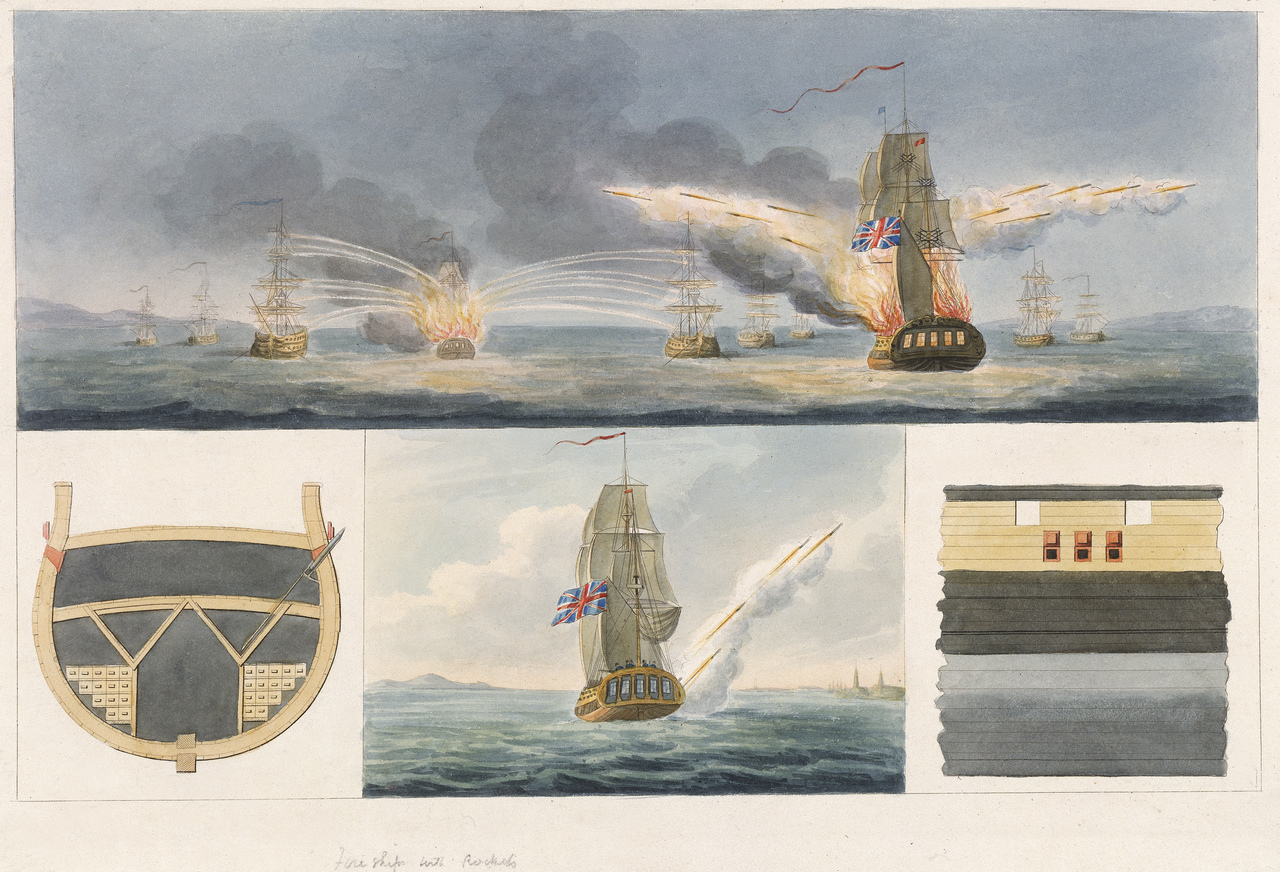
Congreve rockets being fired

The naval climax of the Chesapeake campaign came at the Battle of Baltimore in September 1814. British warships and bomb vessels carrying Congreve rockets bombarded Fort McHenry for over twenty-four hours in an effort to force entry into Baltimore Harbour. HMS Erebus fired the congreve rockets from a 32-pound rocket battery installed below the main deck, which fired through portholes or scuttles pierced in the ship's side. Despite sustained naval fire, the fort held, denying the Royal Navy access and compelling British withdrawal. The failure underscored the limits of naval bombardment against well-prepared coastal defences when unsupported by decisive land success. It was the use of the ship-launched Congreve rockets that inspired a phrase in the fifth line of the first verse of the United States' national anthem, "The Star-Spangled Banner": "the rockets' red glare".

Further north, British naval operations expanded into New England. In September 1814, a combined naval and land expedition seized eastern Maine, culminating in the Battle of Hampden, where naval support enabled the defeat of American militia and the destruction of the frigate USS Adams to prevent its capture. British occupation of the Maine coast secured maritime control of the region for the remainder of the war.

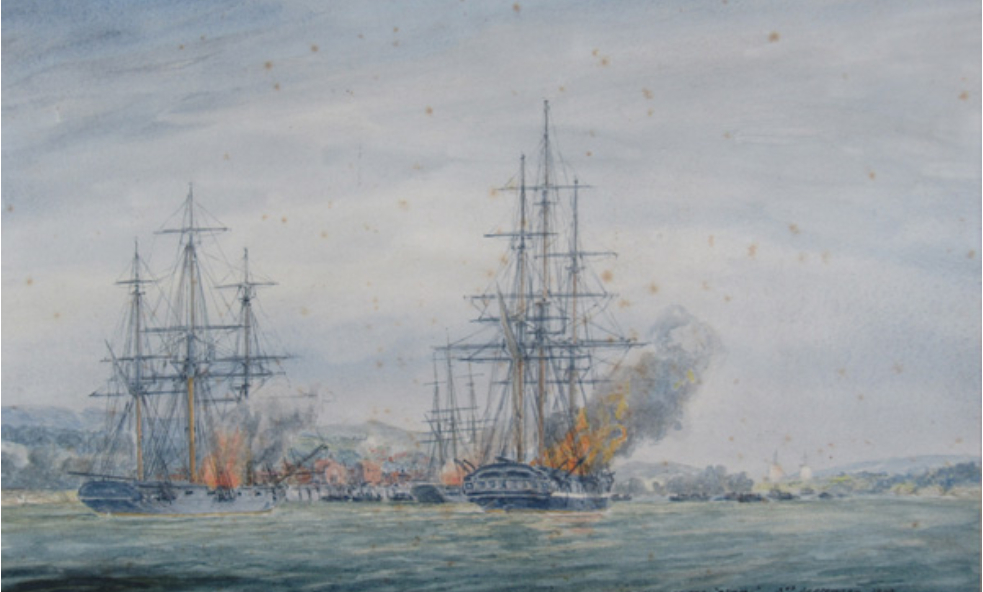
Burning of USS Adams, 1814

Smaller engagements also highlighted persistent coastal resistance. The defense of the cutter Eagle in October 1814, demonstrated how American crews used shore batteries and local militia support to contest British naval superiority in confined waters, delaying capture through improvisation and local knowledge.

Even after the Treaty of Ghent was signed, naval warfare continued. In January 1815, British naval forces engaged in the Battle of Fort Peter capturing the fort in Georgia, using bombardment and landing parties to seize control of the coastal position. This final East Coast operation illustrated both the reach of British sea power and the delays inherent in transatlantic communications.

Collectively, the East Coast naval campaign demonstrated British dominance at sea while revealing that naval power alone could harass, punish and disrupt, but not decisively conquer, the United States.

== Great Lakes theatre of operations ==
The decisive naval theatre of the war lay on the Great Lakes, where waterborne supply lines were indispensable. Roads were primitive, distances vast and armies could not operate without naval support. The American victory at the Battle of Lake Erie in September 1813 destroyed British control of the lake, severed British and Indigenous peoples supply lines in the Northwest, enabled the recapture of Detroit and directly facilitated the American victory at the Battle of the Thames. Control of Lake Erie thus translated immediately into control of the surrounding land theatre, illustrating the operational interdependence of naval and land forces.

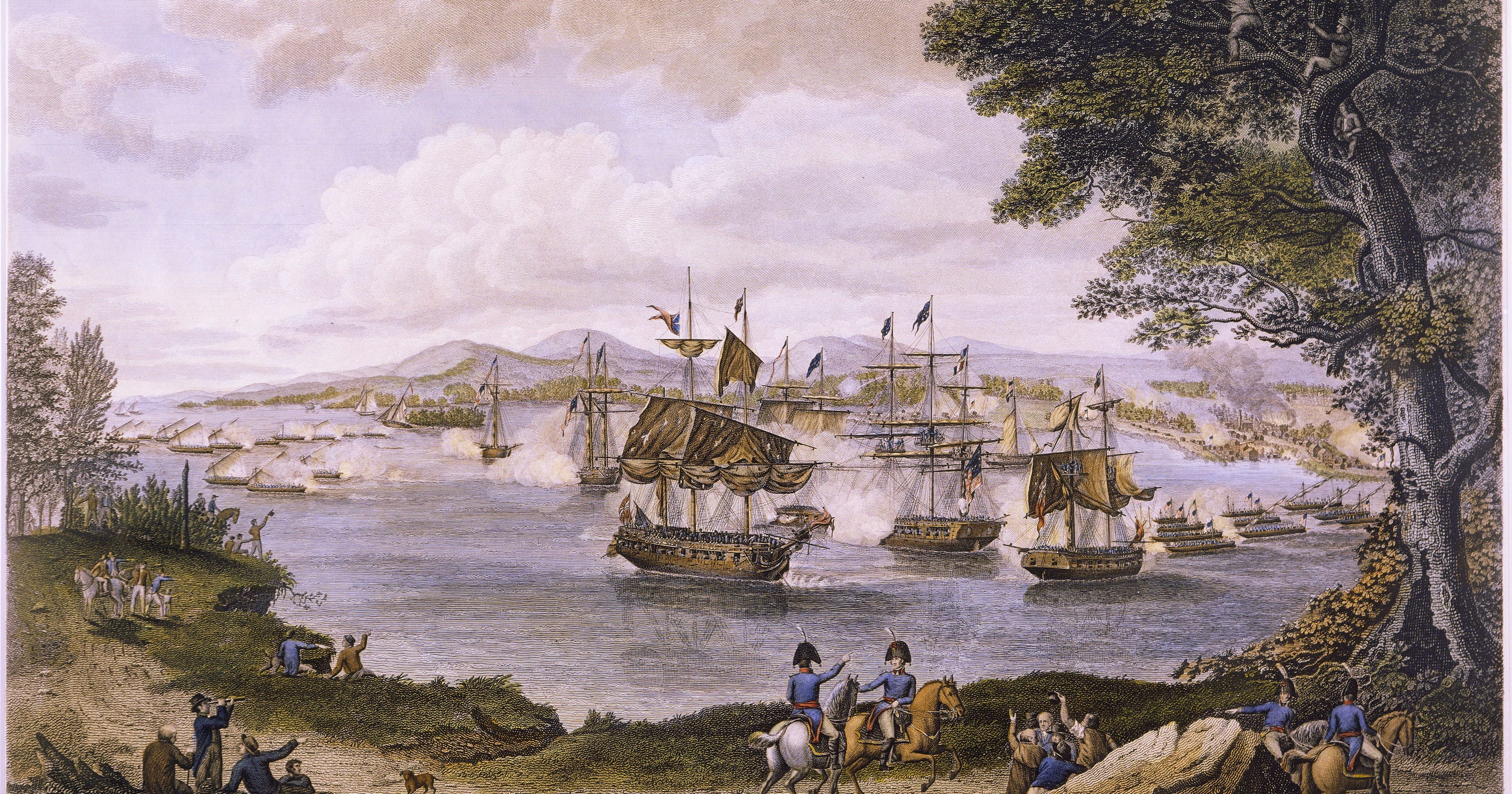
Battle of Lake Champlain

An even clearer example of naval power shaping diplomacy occurred at the Battle of Lake Champlain in September 1814. Despite Britain's global strength following the defeat of Napoleon inter alia the Napoleonic Wars, the loss of naval control on Lake Champlain forced a large British invasion army to retreat from northern New York. This failure denied Britain a territorial bargaining chip at the negotiations in Ghent and reinforced American claims to the prewar boundary. Historians widely agree that this naval engagement had consequences far beyond its immediate tactical outcome.

=== Lake Ontario ===
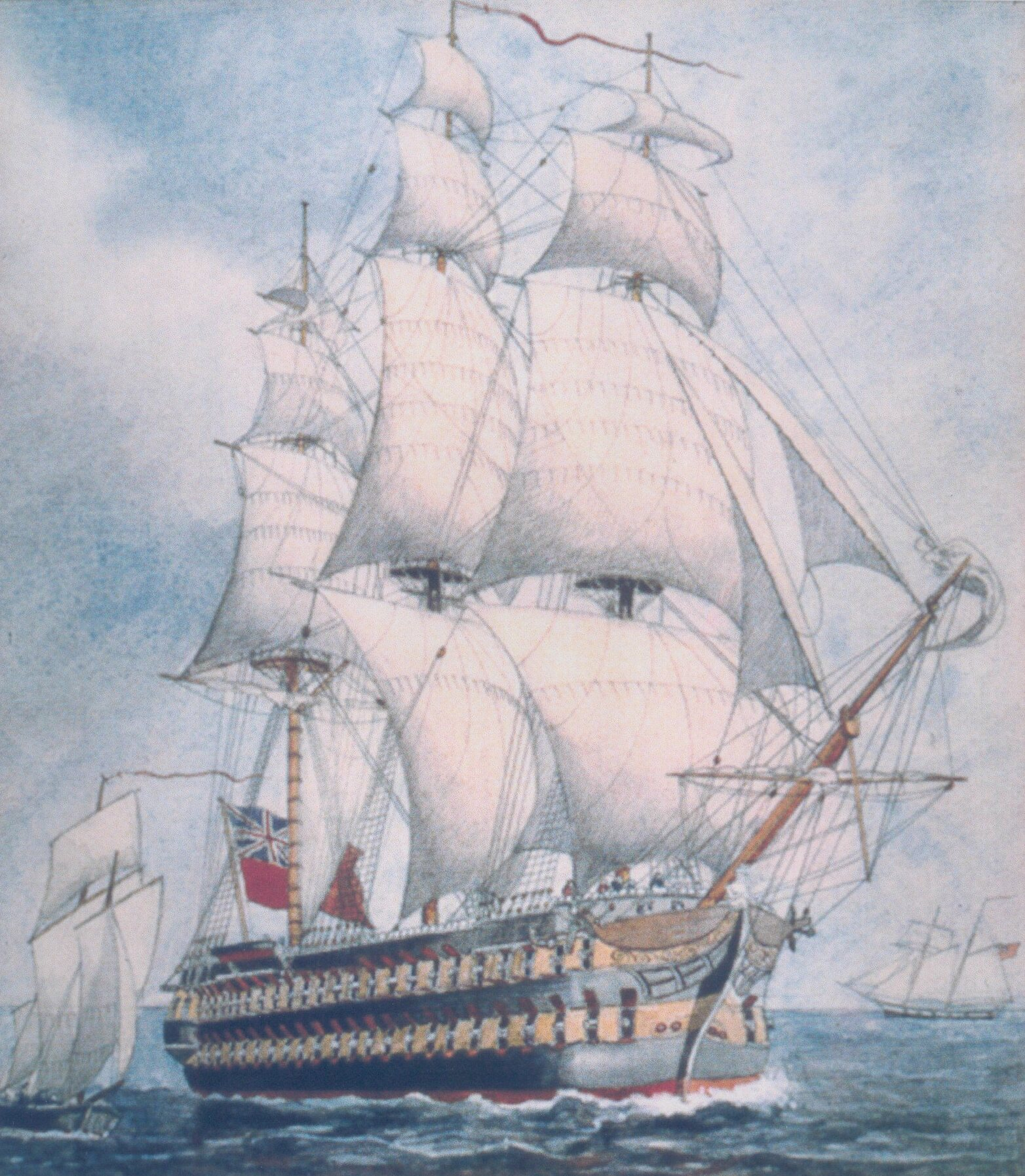
HMS St Lawrence gave the British uncontested control of Lake Ontario.

The struggle for control of the Great Lakes led to engagements on Lake Ontario and a prolonged naval campaign that proved central to the defence of Upper Canada and the outcome of operations along the Niagara River and St. Lawrence River corridors. Lake Ontario was the primary strategic artery linking Montréal to Kingston and the western Great Lakes and whichever side controlled the lake could move troops, artillery and supplies far more efficiently than overland routes, which were slow, primitive and vulnerable. As a result, both Britain and the United States engaged in an intense shipbuilding race centred on Kingston and Sackets Harbor, producing increasingly large and heavily armed warships in an effort to achieve naval superiority.

Throughout 1812 and 1813, naval actions on Lake Ontario were largely indecisive, characterized by manoeuvre, convoy escort and attempts to protect or disrupt amphibious operations rather than fleet destroying battles. British control of Kingston, supported by the Royal Navy and the Provincial Marine, ensured the security of the St. Lawrence River supply line, which was essential for sustaining Upper Canada against American invasions. Conversely, American naval strength at Sackets Harbor allowed the United States to support offensives against York and Fort George in 1813, demonstrating how temporary local naval superiority could enable successful land operations even without permanent control of the lake.

By 1814, neither side had achieved decisive command of Lake Ontario. British naval forces, reinforced by experienced Royal Navy officers and improved ship construction at Kingston, increasingly contested American movements and limited United States operational freedom. The resulting stalemate prevented large scale American penetration toward Montréal and preserved Upper Canada from collapse. In Canadian historiography, the Lake Ontario campaign is therefore viewed as a strategic success for Britain and British North America; although tactically inconclusive, sustained naval denial on the lake ensured survival, safeguarded supply lines and prevented the United States from converting battlefield victories into decisive strategic gains.

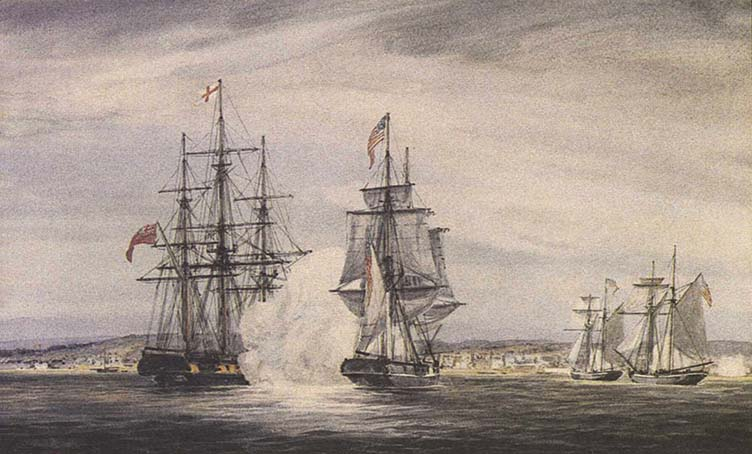
USS Oneida and HMS Royal George in Kingston harbour, 1812

On 10 November 1812, Commodore Isaac Chauncey led an American squadron in a bold attack against the British naval base at Kingston, Upper Canada known as the Battle of Kingston Harbour. Chauncey's force included the brig USS Oneida and six converted schooners armed with heavy guns notably USS Conquest, USS Julia, USS Pert, and USS Growler. The American's pursued the 22-gun British corvette HMS Royal George, the largest warship on Lake Ontario into Kingston’s harbour under the cover of British shore batteries. A fierce cannonade ensued between Chauncey’s schooners and the HMS Royal George, with Fort Henry's guns joining the fray. During the exchange, one of the accompanying schooners, Governor Simcoe, was hit by American shot and sank while attempting to reach the harbour. Although one American gunboat was damaged and Chauncey was ultimately forced to withdraw by nightfall, the raid kept Royal George bottled up and marked the only American attack on Kingston during the war. At the time, British naval power on the Great Lakes rested with the Provincial Marine, a relatively inexperienced force. Their flagship, Royal George, was poorly maintained and understaffed. By contrast, Oneida's crew was made up of seasoned Atlantic sailors and officers with combat experience. Despite not achieving a decisive victory, the American raid proved that the Provincial Marine was unfit for combat and marked the beginning of American control over Lake Ontario. For the British, the defence sparked increased loyalty among Upper Canadians and revealed the need for Royal Navy reinforcements. The onset of winter halted further actions, leaving both sides to regroup for the next campaign season.

=== Lake Erie ===
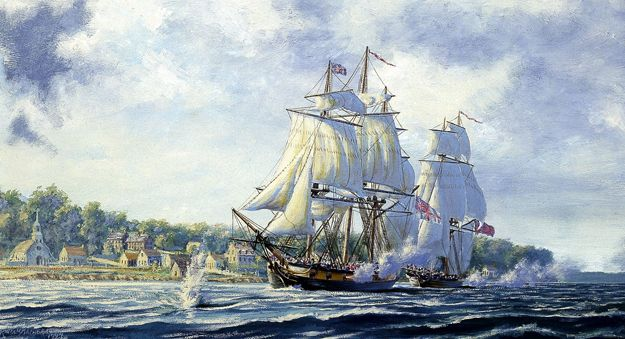
Bombardment of Fort Detroit, 1812 by Peter Rindisbacher

The naval engagements on Lake Erie constituted one of the most decisive maritime campaigns of the conflict, as control of the lake directly determined the fate of Upper Canada's western frontier. Lake Erie was the principal supply route linking British and Indigenous forces at Amherstburg and Detroit with the interior of Upper Canada and without naval superiority the British position in the region was unsustainable. From 1812 into 1813, both sides engaged in a frantic shipbuilding race at Presque Isle and Amherstburg, recognizing that naval dominance on the lake would dictate subsequent land operations.

Early in the campaign, British naval forces maintained a fragile advantage, allowing them to supply their garrisons and Indigenous allies, while constraining American movement. However, shortages of materials, manpower and secure supply lines increasingly undermined British shipbuilding and operational readiness. The decisive moment came with the Battle of Lake Erie on 10 September 1813, when the American squadron under Oliver Hazard Perry defeated the British fleet commanded by Robert Heriot Barclay. The loss of the British squadron resulted in the immediate collapse of British naval power on the lake and severed the supply line to Amherstburg.

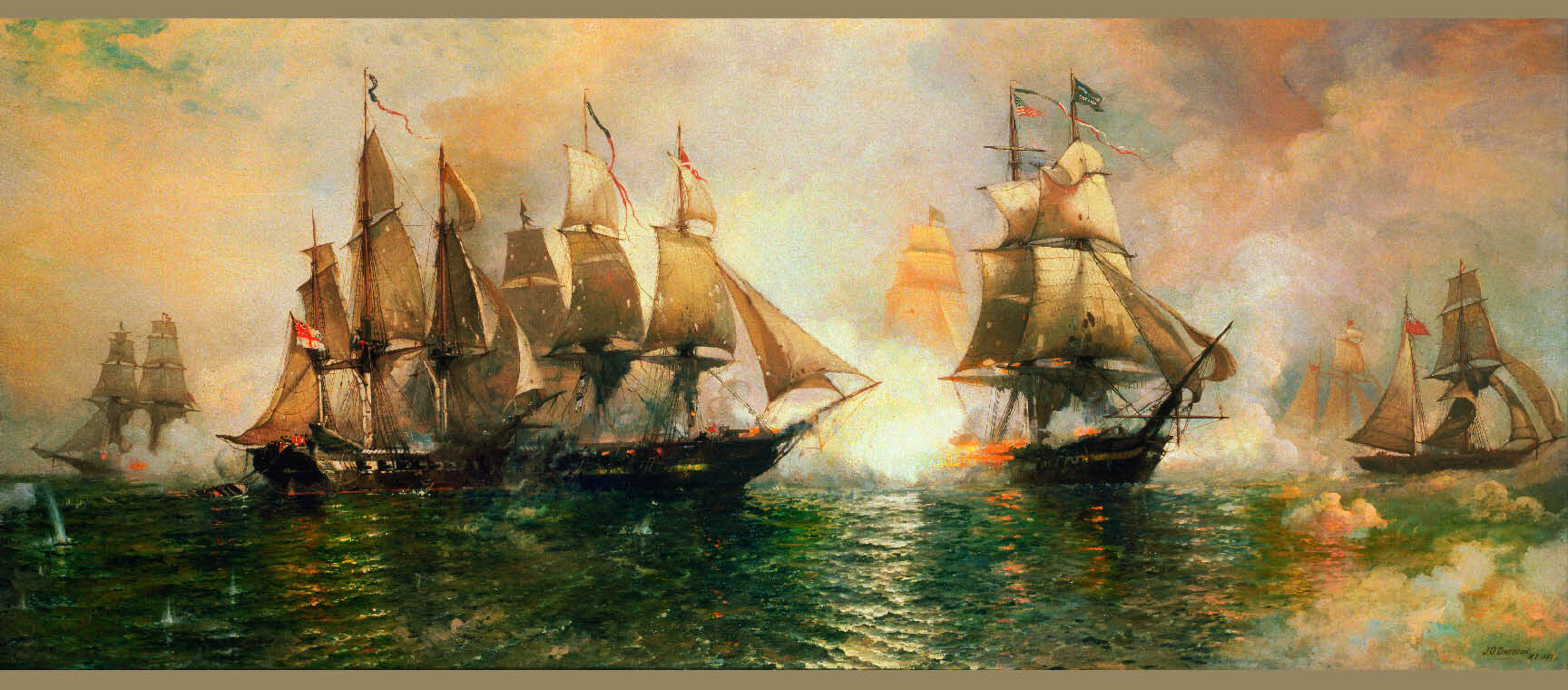
Battle of Lake Erie by Julian Oliver Davidson, c. 1887

The consequences of this defeat were profound and immediate. British and Indigenous forces were compelled to abandon Detroit and retreat eastward, leading directly to their defeat at the Battle of the Thames and the death of Tecumseh, a catastrophic blow to the British and Indigenous alliance in the region. In Canadian historiography, the Lake Erie campaign is often interpreted as a cautionary example of how naval inferiority could rapidly translate into territorial loss, contrasting sharply with the more successful naval denial strategies employed on Lake Ontario. Ultimately, the engagements on Lake Erie demonstrate the central lesson of the War of 1812’s inland naval warfare with sustained control of key waterways essential not merely for tactical success, but for the survival of entire theatres of operation in British North America.

=== Lake Huron ===
The naval engagements on Lake Huron formed a critical but often overlooked component of the defence of British North America, as control of Lake Huron sustained British communications with the western interior and preserved alliances with Indigenous nations. Lake Huron functioned as the logistical backbone linking Upper Canada to Michilimackinac and the upper Great Lakes and without secure naval transport along this route, British forces would have been isolated from their western posts. Unlike Lake Erie, where a single decisive battle determined control, the Lake Huron campaign consisted of a series of raids, convoy operations and small naval actions aimed at maintaining supply dominance rather than seeking fleet destruction.

In 1813, American forces attempted to disrupt British control by targeting supply routes and forward bases. The capture of Fort Mackinac by British and Indigenous forces early in the war, supported by naval mobility on Lake Huron, secured British influence over the upper lakes and Indigenous alliances that proved vital throughout the conflict. British and Canadian naval units, drawing on the Provincial Marine and later Royal Navy detachments, operated from bases such as Penetanguishene, escorting supply vessels and countering American incursions with limited but effective resources.

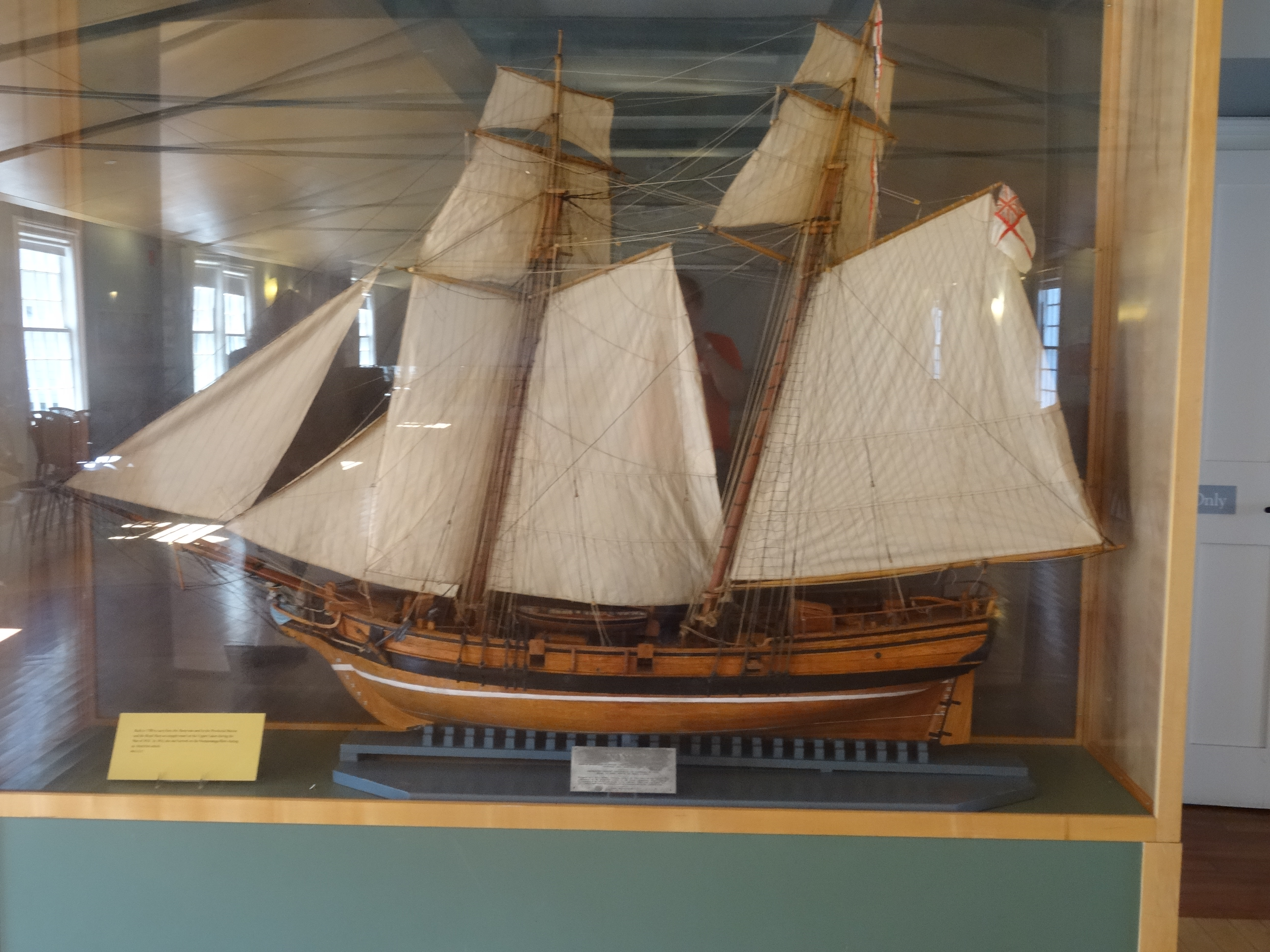
Model of HMS Nancy

The most significant American success occurred in 1814, when United States forces temporarily disrupted British supply lines by capturing vessels and attacking outposts. This advantage proved short-lived. British naval forces rapidly reasserted control through aggressive counter-raids and the recapture of key positions, culminating in the destruction of the American squadron at the Nottawasaga River and the restoration of British naval dominance on the lake. During August 1814 on Lake Huron, the British schooner HMS Nancy, carrying supplies to Michilimackinac, was pursued by United States naval forces. To avoid capture, her crew set fire and scuttled the vessel on the Nottawasaga River, highlighting logistical warfare, inland naval mobility and British efforts to retain upper Great Lakes control.

In Canadian historiography, the Lake Huron campaign is viewed as a strategic success with sustained naval control, preserved British authority in the upper Great Lakes, protected Indigenous alliances and prevented the United States from translating tactical successes into lasting territorial gains, underscoring the decisive importance of inland naval logistics in the War of 1812.

== West Indies / Gulf Coast theatre of operations ==
Naval operations in the West Indies and Gulf Coast of the United States during the War of 1812 formed a peripheral but strategically significant theatre, linking Atlantic Ocean commerce warfare with Britain’s late-war offensive against the southern United States. Early in the conflict, American naval power in the Caribbean relied heavily on privateers and small warships operating against British trade routes. Engagements such as the Battle of La Guaira fought on 11 December 1812, illustrated this pattern, as American privateers challenged British maritime commerce near Spanish controlled ports, creating diplomatic frictions, while disrupting shipping without threatening British naval dominance

By 1814, the strategic balance shifted decisively after Britain’s victory over Napoleon allowed the redeployment of veteran troops and powerful naval forces to the Gulf of Mexico. British naval strategy emphasized amphibious warfare, coastal control and the opening of riverine routes to support land campaigns. This approach was first tested at the First Battle of Fort Bowyer in mid-September 1814, when Royal Navy warships attempted to reduce the American fort guarding Mobile Bay. The failure of the naval bombardment and the loss of HMS Hermes demonstrated the vulnerability of naval forces operating close inshore against prepared coastal defences.

The capture of USS Frolic on 20 April 1814, had USS Frolic pursued and overtaken by superior British forces in the Caribbean. After a prolonged chase and attempts to escape, the American vessel surrendered. The event illustrated Britain’s increasing success in suppressing United States naval operations late in the War of 1812.

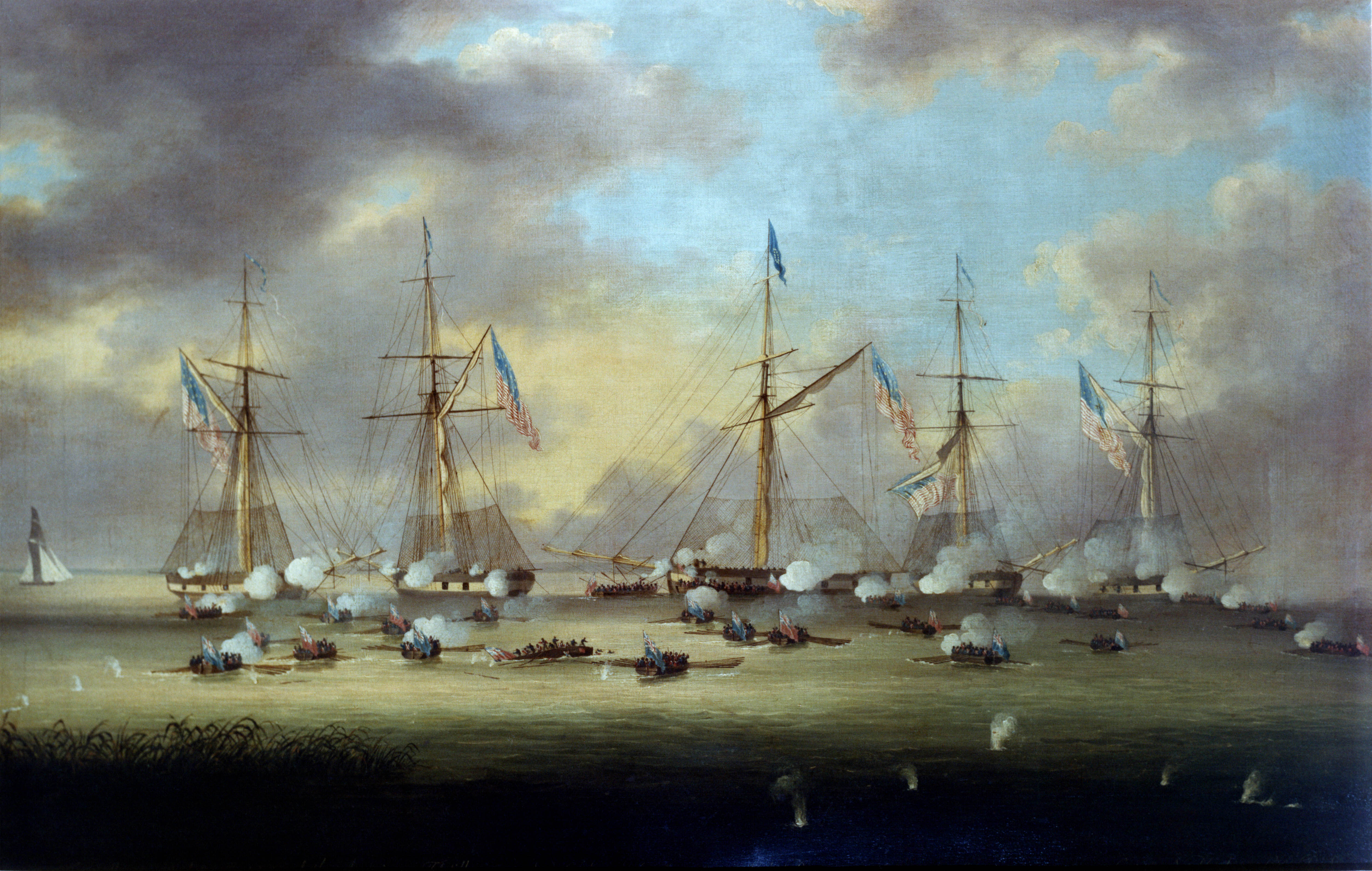
British and American gunboats at Battle of Lake Borgne, 1814

British naval forces regrouped and shifted their focus toward New Orleans, where control of shallow inland waters proved essential. The Battle of Lake Borgne in December 1814 exemplified small boat naval warfare, as British sailors and marines captured the American gunboat flotilla after intense close-quarters fighting. Although costly, the engagement cleared the approach routes for the British army’s landing and underscored the importance of naval mobility in amphibious operations.

Following the British defeat on land at the Battle of New Orleans, naval forces sought to assert control of the Mississippi River through the bombardment of Fort St. Philip in January 1815. Despite sustained shelling by British bomb vessels, the fort held, denying naval passage upriver and confirming the limits of naval power without coordinated land success.

Together, these operations demonstrate that while British naval superiority in the Gulf of Mexico was substantial, it could not by itself secure strategic victory, reinforcing the broader lesson that sea power required effective integration with land forces to achieve decisive results

== Pacific Ocean theatre of operations ==
Naval operations in the Pacific Ocean during the War of 1812 represented the most geographically distant extension of the conflict and were driven almost entirely by American commerce raiding strategy. In early 1813, the American frigate USS Essex, commanded by Captain David Porter, rounded Cape Horn and entered the Pacific with the objective of destroying British whaling and merchant shipping, exploiting the Royal Navy’s thin presence in the region. Porter’s cruise aimed not at territorial conquest but at economic warfare, targeting an industry vital to British maritime supply.

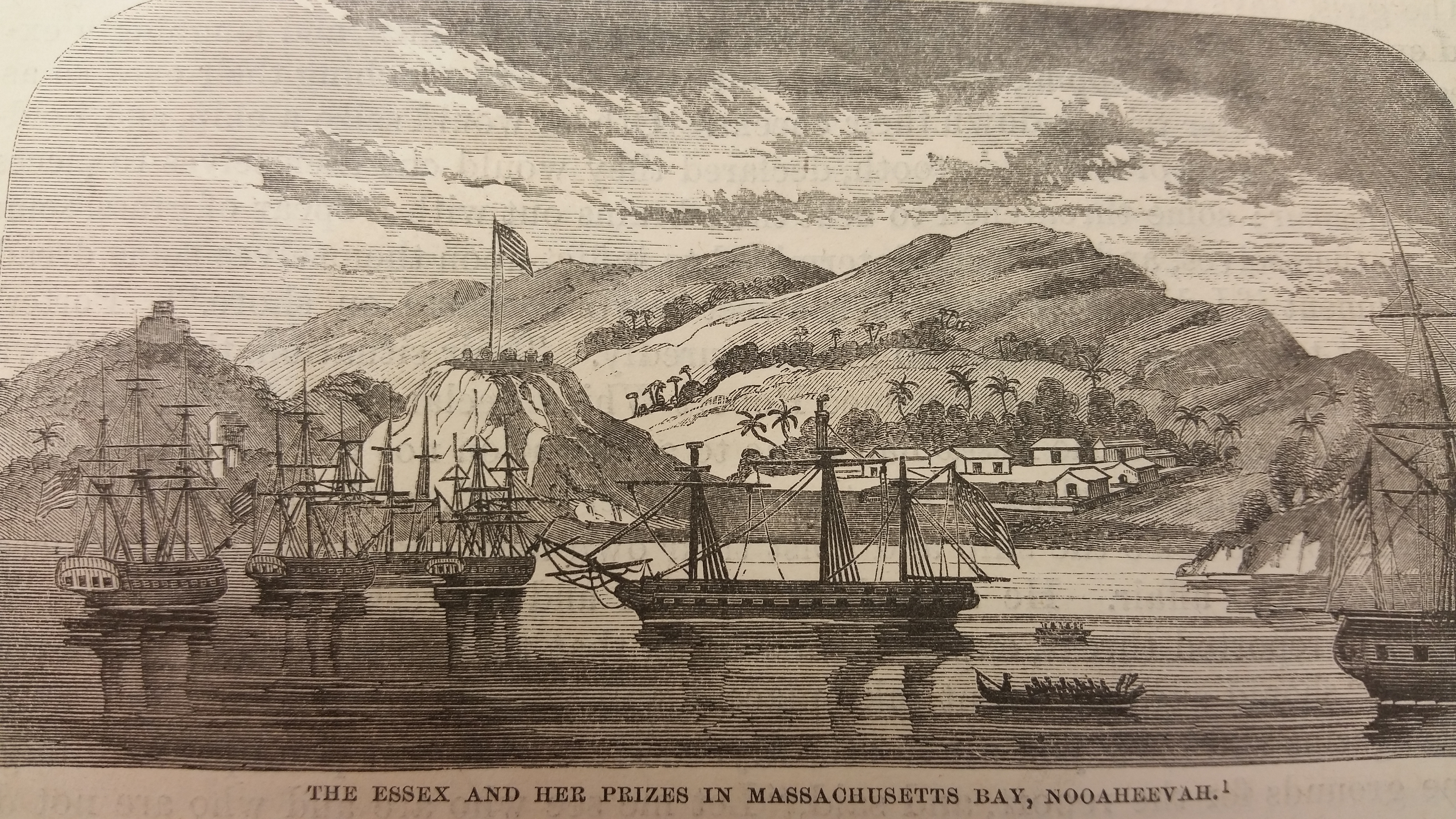
USS Essex and prize ships

The campaign opened with a series of actions in the Galápagos Islands. On 28 May 1813, the Action off James Island resulted in the capture of several British whalers by American prize crews operating under the USS Essex direction, expanding Captain Porter’s improvised squadron and depriving Britain of vessels, crews and stores. This success was followed in July 1813 by the Action off Charles Island, where additional British whalers were taken after brief resistance, further crippling British Pacific commerce.

To sustain prolonged operations, Captain Porter established a forward base at Nuku Hiva in the Marquesas Islands between October 1813 and May 1814. The Nuku Hiva Campaign involved fortifying a harbour, repairing ships and intervening in local conflicts to secure American control of the anchorage. Although tactically successful, the base proved diplomatically and logistically untenable, highlighting the limits of sustained naval power far from home ports.

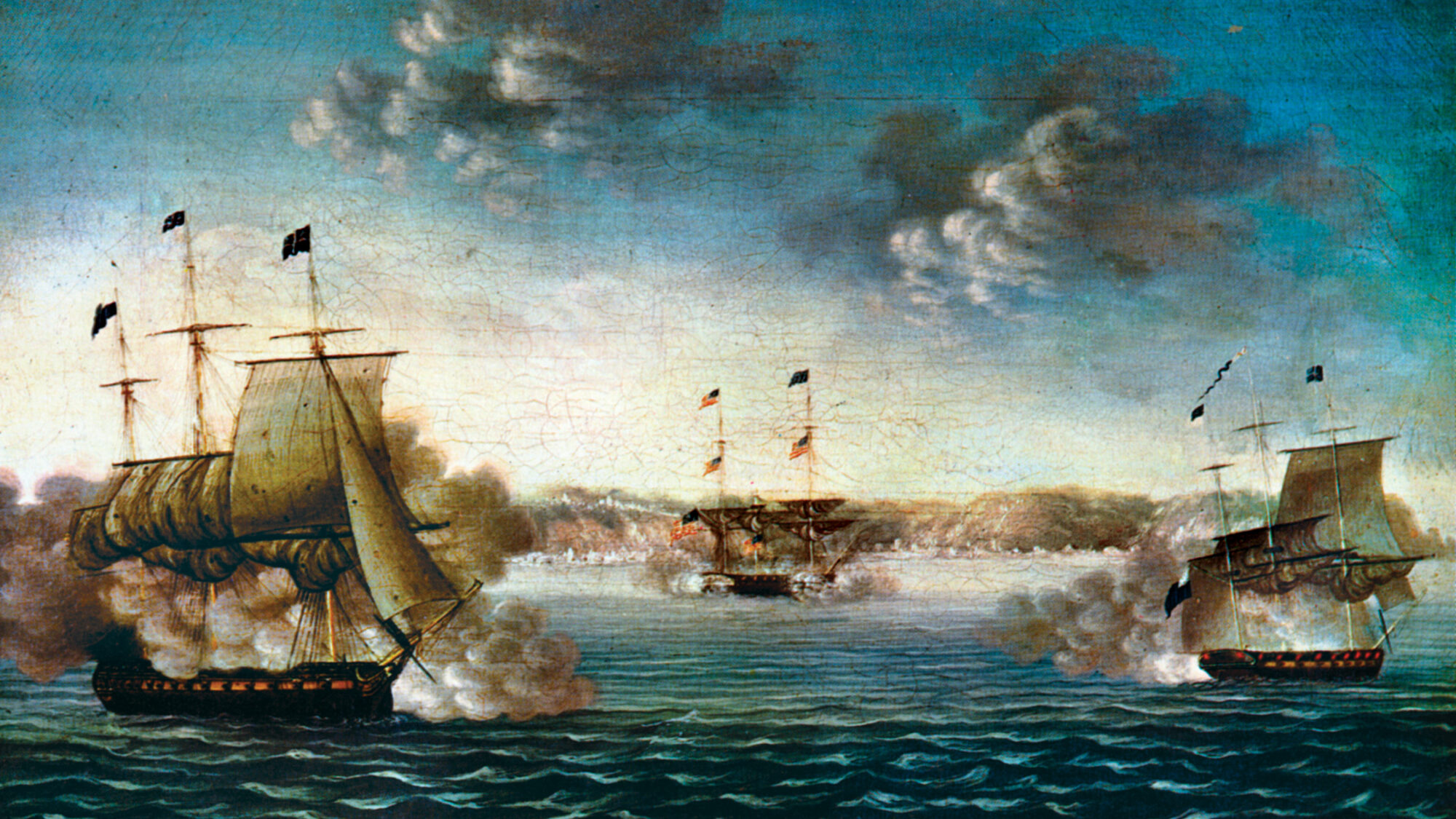
Battle of Valparaíso, 1814

British naval response culminated in March 1814 at the Battle of Valparaíso, when HMS Phoebe and HMS Cherub engaged USS Essex off the Chilean coast. Employing superior long-gun tactics, the British squadron systematically disabled Essex, forcing her surrender after heavy casualties. The loss of Essex ended American naval operations in the Pacific and reaffirmed British command of blue-water warfare once adequate forces were deployed.

In strategic terms, the Pacific campaign demonstrated both the reach and the vulnerability of American naval power. While Captain Porter's cruise inflicted disproportionate economic damage and forced Britain to divert resources globally, it ultimately confirmed that sustained naval operations required secure logistics and fleet support advantages Britain alone possessed in the Pacific theatre of operations.

== Impact ==
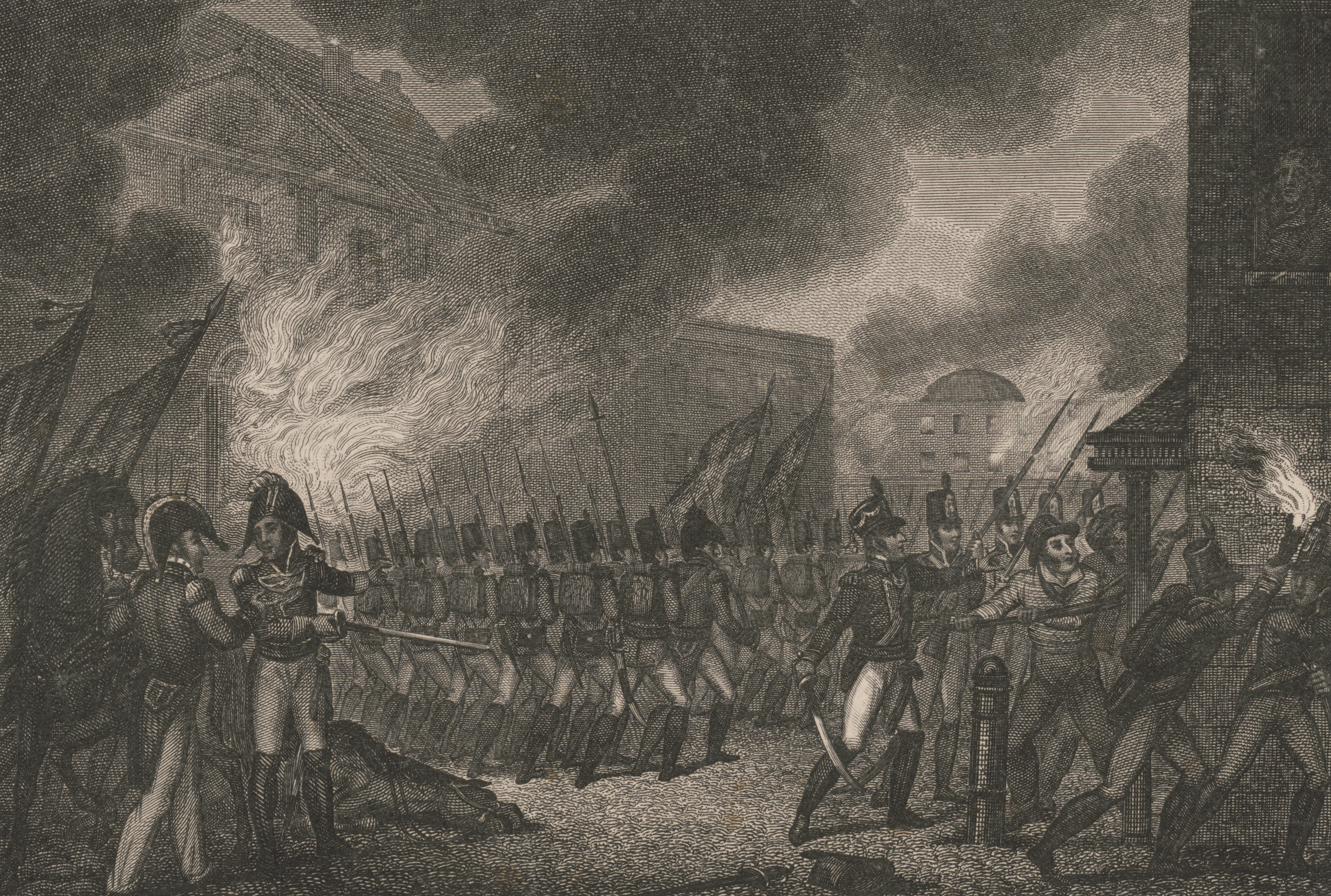
1815 illustration of the Burning of Washington

British naval supremacy along the Atlantic Ocean coast nevertheless exerted sustained economic and military pressure on the United States. From 1813 onward, the Royal Navy imposed a tightening blockade that crippled American trade and sharply reduced customs revenue. British warships supported amphibious raids along the Chesapeake Bay, culminating in the capture and burning of Washington in August 1814. Yet these operations failed to produce a decisive strategic result, as Britain lacked the manpower and political will to occupy and hold large portions of American territory. The limits of maritime power without sustained land control became increasingly evident as the war progressed.

Naval warfare in the War of 1812 demonstrates that command of the sea was most consequential when it produced sustained local control rather than symbolic victories or distant blockades. While Britain dominated the oceans, American success on the Great Lakes preserved U.S. territorial integrity, shaped land campaigns and influenced the peace settlement. The conflict confirmed a central lesson of early nineteenth century warfare, control of strategically vital waters could determine outcomes on land and at the negotiating table even in the absence of global naval superiority.

== Naval interpretation between Canada and the United States ==
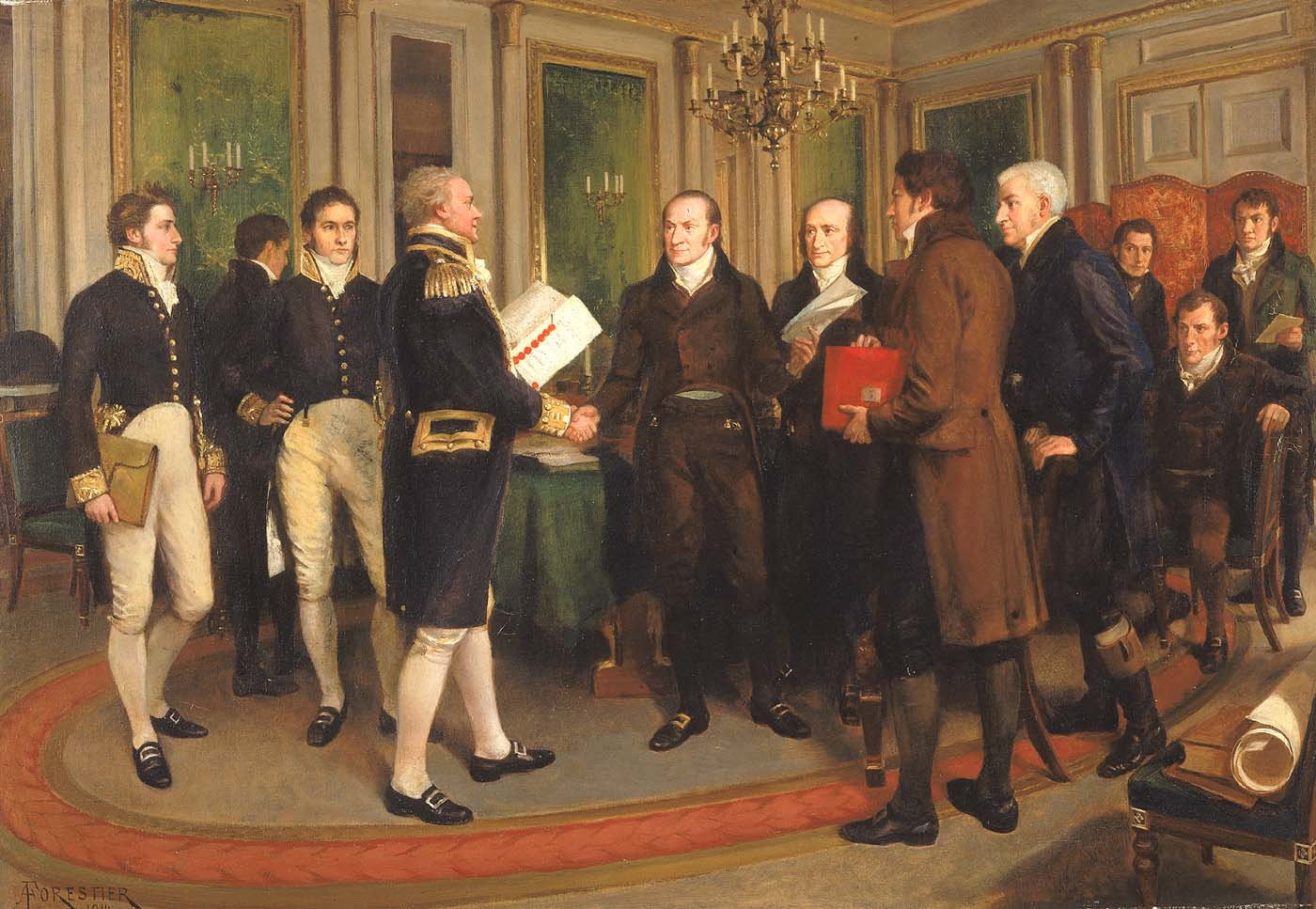
Signing Treaty of Ghent, 1814

United States historiography traditionally emphasizes early frigate victories as evidence of national resilience and naval professionalism, often portraying these battles as foundational to American naval identity. Works by Donald R. Hickey and American naval historians tend to frame Atlantic victories as morale-building while acknowledging their limited strategic effect.

Canadian historiography, by contrast, places far greater emphasis on the Great Lakes as defensive systems essential to the survival of British North America. Canadian scholars such as Pierre Berton stress that naval control on inland waters prevented American conquest and preserved Upper Canada, framing Lake Erie and Lake Champlain as existential contests rather than symbolic ones. From this perspective, British failures on the lakes are often attributed to logistical constraints and industrial inferiority rather than seamanship.

Where United States historians often describe the war as a “second war of independence,” Canadian historians interpret naval operations as part of a successful defensive war that secured Canada's future boundaries. Despite these differences, both historiographical traditions converge on one conclusion that local naval supremacy on the Great Lakes not oceanic dominance was the decisive naval factor in the War of 1812.

== See also ==
- War of 1812 ships
- List of naval battles of the War of 1812

== Bibliography ==
- Berton, P. (1980). The invasion of Canada, 1812–1813. Toronto: McClelland & Stewart.
- Daughan, G. C. (2011). 1812: The Navy's war. New York, NY: Basic Books.
- Dudley, W. S. (Ed.). (1985). The naval war of 1812: A documentary history (Vols. 1–3). Washington, DC: Naval Historical Center.
- Gough, B. M. (1988). Fighting sail on Lake Huron and Georgian Bay: The War of 1812 and its aftermath. Annapolis, MD: Naval Institute Press.
- Hickey, D. R. (2012). The War of 1812: A forgotten conflict (2nd ed.). Urbana: University of Illinois Press.
- Lambert, A. (2012). The challenge: Britain against America in the naval war of 1812. London: Faber & Faber.
- Taylor, A. (2010). The civil war of 1812. New York: Alfred A. Knopf.
