= Capture of East India Company ship Nautilus =

- Part of the War of 1812
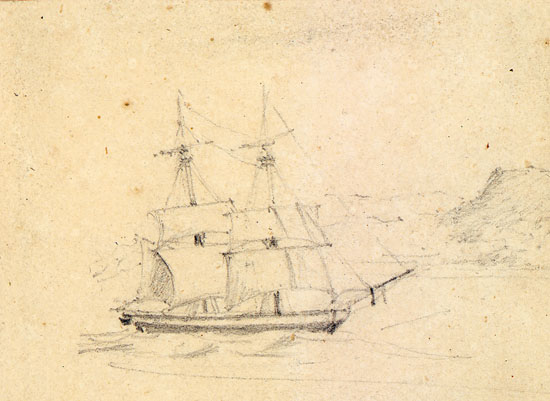
- An 1813 illustration of USS Peacock
| Date | June 30, 1815 |
| Location | Off Java, Pacific Ocean |
| Result | American victory |

Belligerents
| United States | East India Company |

Commanders and leaders
| (United States) Lewis Warrington | Charles Boyce (surrendered) |

Strength
| 1 sloop-of-war | 1 brig |

Casualties and losses
| None | 7 killed 6 wounded 1 brig captured |

The capture of East India Company ship Nautilus was a single-ship action which took place on June 30, 1815 as part of the War of 1812. It occurred during the third voyage of United States Navy sloop-of-war USS Peacock under the command of Master Commandant Lewis Warrington. Though the conflict had ended six months earlier thanks to the Treaty of Ghent, a fact which Warrington knew about, he attacked the East India Company brig HCS Nautilus after its commander, Charles Boyce, refused to strike his colours. Peacock opened fire, inflicting several casualties on the crew of Nautilus and forcing her surrender, though Warrington released the brig after Boyce provided documents pertaining to the treaty. The action was the last military engagement of the conflict.

== Background ==
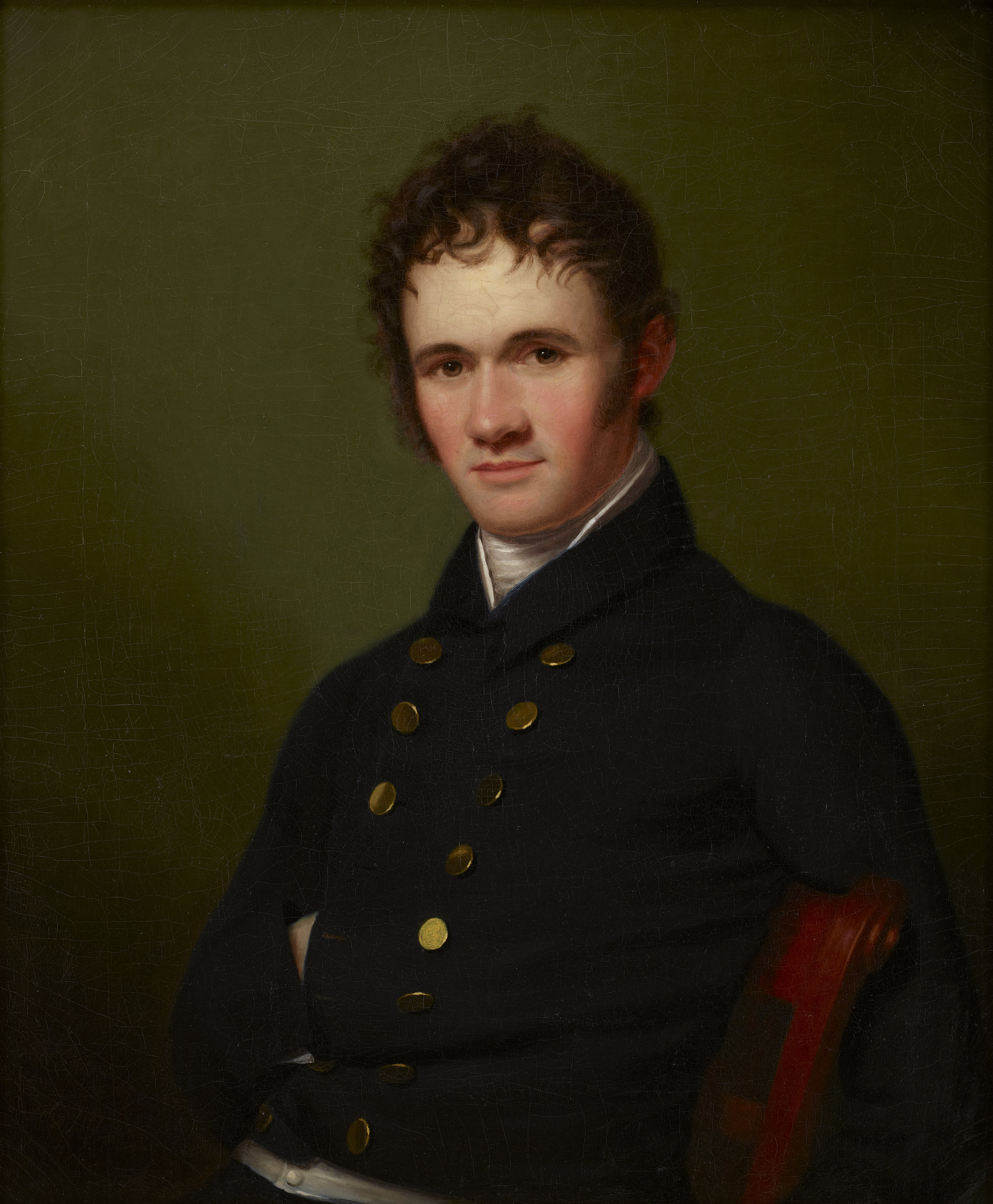
An 1801 portrait of Lewis Warrington by Rembrandt Peale

Towards the end of 1814, the Americans were gathering a squadron in New York, under Commodore Stephen Decatur, which was intended to attack British merchant shipping in the Indian Ocean. On 14 January 1815, Decatur took advantage of a blizzard and left harbour in the frigate USS President, while the blockading squadron of the Royal Navy had been blown off station. However, the President went aground on the bar at the harbour mouth. When it was eventually floated off, the damaged frigate encountered the returning British squadron and was captured.

The remaining vessels of Decatur's squadron (the sloops of war USS Peacock, commanded by Master Commandant Lewis Warrington, and USS Hornet and the brig tender USS Tom Bowline) were not aware of the President's fate. On 22 January, a strong north-westerly gale blew up and the three American vessels sortied in thick weather the next day. They reached open sea despite the British blockaders being plainly in sight as the Americans passed the bar.

The three American vessels made for a pre-arranged rendezvous with the President at Tristan da Cunha. Hornet became separated from the other two vessels during the voyage. Peacock and Tom Bowline reached Tristan da Cunha on 18 March but were driven off by a gale. They returned on 23 March to find that in their absence the Hornet had arrived, and had engaged and captured HMS Penguin. Penguin was too badly damaged to be repaired and was later set on fire. Tom Bowline was sent to Rio de Janeiro as a cartel with Penguin's crew.

After waiting in vain for the President until 15 April, Hornet and Peacock set out together for the Indian Ocean. On 27 April, they encountered the British ship of the line HMS Cornwallis, which they at first mistook for a valuable East Indiaman. When they realised their mistake, the American ships split up to escape. Cornwallis pursued the slower Hornet, which evaded capture only by jettisoning all guns and small arms, most of the stores, and even substantial parts of the sloop's structure.

== Capture of Nautilus ==
Warrington pressed on into the Indian Ocean. During the next few weeks, Peacock captured four British prizes. Rather than weaken his crew by putting them aboard the captured vessels and sending them into friendly or neutral ports, Warrington had the prizes set on fire, after removing their cargo and useful stores. The journals of Warrington's subordinates noted that he knew about the treaty prior to encountering Nautilus.

On 30 June, Peacock was in the Sunda Straits, with the island of Krakatau under the sloop's lee. There she sighted the East India Company brig Nautilus. Nautilus measured 200 tons, was armed with ten 18-pounder carronades and four 9-pounder guns, and had a crew of 80, most of whom were Indian lascars. (Peacock was armed with twenty 32-pounder carronades and two 12-pounder guns.)

Nautilus's captain, Lieutenant Charles Boyce, sent a boat to Peacock, with his purser, Mr. Bartlett, onboard. Bartlett later insisted that he informed Warrington that the war had ended before Warrington ordered him to be taken below; Warrington denied this. As Peacock closed in on Nautilus, Boyce hailed her and repeated that the war was over, but Warrington later claimed that he had thought this a ruse de guerre to give Nautilus time to escape under the cover of the neutral Dutch fort at Anyer. He demanded that Boyce haul down his flag. Rather than submit in such a manner, Boyce prepared to fight.

Peacock then fired a single broadside (or by Bartlett's account, two broadsides), which caused substantial damage to the Nautilus. Warrington's attack killed one seaman, two European invalids, and three lascars aboard the brig, mortally wounded Nautilus's first lieutenant, and wounded Boyce and five lascars. Peacock suffered no damage or casualties.

== Aftermath ==
When Boyce provided documents proving that the Treaty of Ghent, which ended the war, had been ratified, Warrington released Nautilus. At no point did he in any way inquire about Boyce's condition or that of any of the injured on Nautilus. Peacock returned to New York on 30 October. A court of inquiry in Boston a year later exonerated Warrington of all blame. In his report on the incident, Warrington stated that the only British casualties had been lascars.
