= List of naval battles of the War of 1812 =

List of naval battles of the War of 1812.

== Forces ==
- United States Navy
- United States Marine Corps
- Revenue-Marine
- Royal Navy
- Royal Marines
- Provincial Marine

== List of Battles ==
- First Battle of Sackett's Harbor 19 July 1812
- USS Essex vs HMS Alert 13 August 1812
- USS Constitution vs HMS Guerriere 19 August 1812
- Capture of HMS Frolic 18 October 1812
- Action off Madeira 25 October 1812
- Action off Kingston 6 November 1812
- Action off Brazil 29 December 1812
- Action in the Demerara River 24 February 1813
- Battle of Rappahannock River 3 April 1813
- Battle of York 27 April 1813
- Battle of Fort George 25–27 May 1813
- Action off James Island 28 May 1813
- Second Battle of Sackett's Harbor 28–29 May 1813
- Battle of Boston Harbor 1 June 1813
- Action off Charles Island 14 July 1813
- Action off Bermuda 5 August 1813
- Action off the Niagara 10 August 1813
- Action off St. David's Head 14 August 1813
- Action off Pemaquid Point 5 September 1813
- Battle of Lake Erie 10 September 1813
- Action off the Geneses 11 September 1813
- "Burlington Races" 28 September 1813
- Battle of Valparaiso 28 March 1814
- Action in the Straits of Florida 20 April 1814
- Action off Cape Canaveral 28 April 1814
- Battle of Fort Oswego (1814) 6 May 1814
- Battle of Big Sandy Creek 29–30 May 1814
- Sinking of HMS Reindeer 28 June 1814
- Action at Nottawasaga 14 August 1814
- Sinking of HMS Avon 1 September 1814
- Capture of the Scorpion and Tigress 2–6 September 1814
- Battle of Plattsburgh 11 September 1814
- Battle of Baltimore 12–15 September 1814
- First Battle of Fort Bowyer 14–16 September 1814
- Battle of Fayal 26–27 September 1814
- Action off the Bay of St. Louis 13 December 1814
- Battle of Lake Borgne 14 December 1814
- Bombardment of Fort St. Philip (1815) 9–18 January 1815
- Battle of Fort Peter 13–14 January 1815
- Capture of USS President 15 January 1815
- Action in the Mid-Atlantic 20 February 1815
- Action off Tristan da Cunha 23 March 1815
- Capture of East India Company ship Nautilus 30 June 1815
