= USS Tom Bowline =

History

United States
- Name: USS Tom Bowline
- Acquired: by purchase, 1814
- Fate: Sold, probably 1818

General characteristics
- Type: Schooner
- Displacement: 260 long tons (264 t)
- Complement: 90 officers and enlisted
- Armament: 12 guns

USS Tom Bowline was a schooner that the United States Navy used as a storeship during the War of 1812. The Navy sold her c.1818.

== Career ==
The Navy purchased Tom Bowline in late 1814 at Portsmouth, New Hampshire, for use as a storeship, and put Lieutenant B. V. Hoffman in command. Subsequently, proceeding to New York, she joined President, Hornet, and Peacock in preparations for a raiding foray into the East Indies.

President's sortie on 14 January 1815, however, ended in disaster — after grounding and suffering severe damage, the frigate fell victim and captive to a superior British squadron on the following day — 15 January. On the 22nd, a strong northeasterly gale blew up and provided the three other American ships at New York an opportunity to escape the vigilant eyes of the British blockaders. Tom Bowline bent on storm canvas to accompany Hornet and Peacock in their bid for freedom of the open sea.

Unaware of President's fate, the three ships made for Tristan da Cunha for the prearranged rendezvous. Hornet became separated en route, leaving her two consorts to press on without her. Tom Bowline and Peacock reached the volcanic island on 18 March — only to be driven off by a gale.

Hornet arrived five days later, but her landfall coincided with the appearance in the area of British brig-sloop Penguin. The two ships closed for action, and Hornet damaged Penguin seriously enough to warrant destruction of the Briton. The sighting of strange sail on the horizon hastened Hornet's burning of the prize, but apprehension turned to relief as the sails proved to be Peacock and Tom Bowline returning to Tristan da Cunha for the planned rendezvous. Tom Bowline embarked the Penguin's captive crew and took the prisoners to Rio de Janeiro, Brazil. The crew arrived at Bahia on 26 April. The war had already ended at the time of the encounter, but none of the vessels had received the news.

== Fate ==
Records giving details of Tom Bowline's subsequent service have not been found, but the vessel was apparently sold in 1818.

== See also ==
- Capture of USS President
- Capture of HMS Penguin
