= Capture of HMS Penguin =

1815 naval action

- Part of the War of 1812
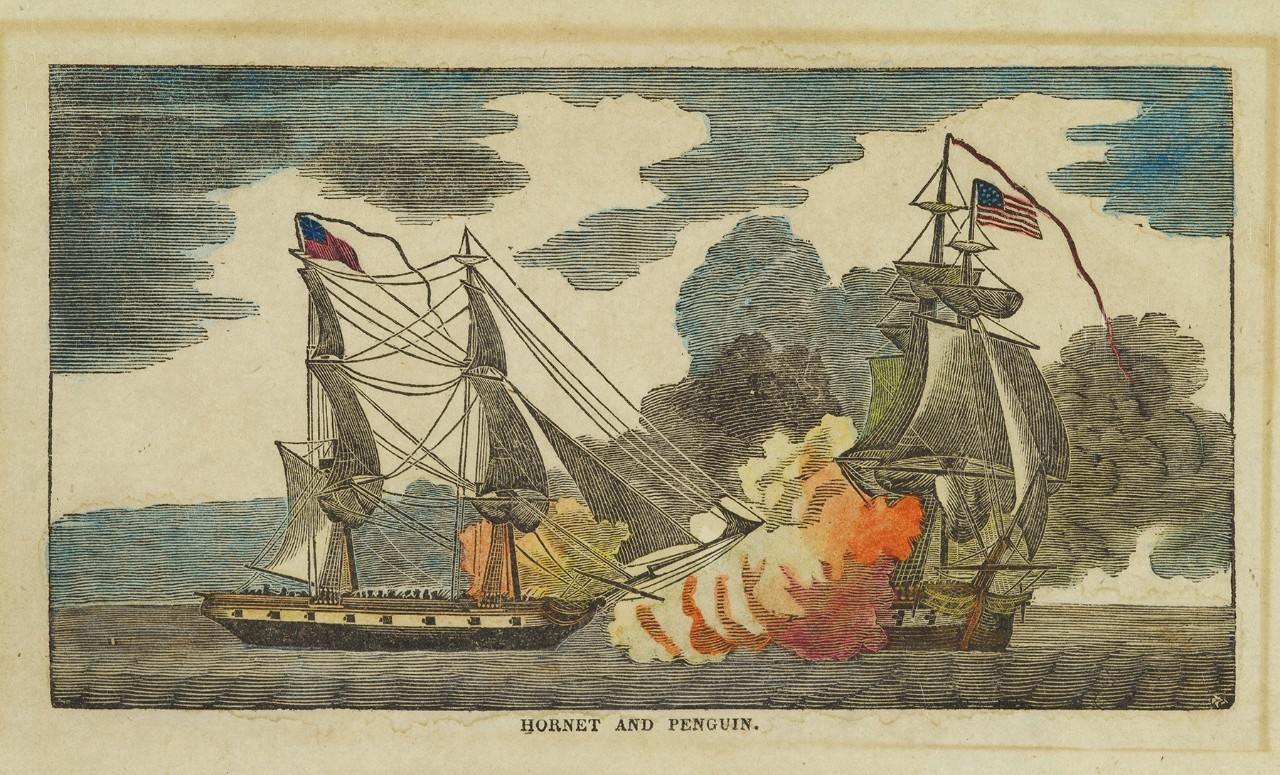
- 1816 engraving of Hornet (right) fighting against Penguin (left) by Abel Bowen
Date	March 23, 1815
Location	Off Tristan da Cunha, Atlantic Ocean
Result	American victory

Belligerents
United States	(United Kingdom of Great Britain and Ireland) United Kingdom

Commanders and leaders
James Biddle	James Dickenson †

Strength
Sloop-of-war Hornet	Brig-sloop Penguin

Casualties and losses
2 killed 7 wounded	1 killed 28 wounded 90 captured Penguin captured

The capture of HMS Penguin was a single-ship action which took place on March 23, 1815 as part of the War of 1812. It occurred when United States Navy brig USS Hornet under the command of James Biddle encountered the British Royal Navy brig-sloop HMS Penguin off Tristan da Cunha, and was one of several naval engagements which occurred after the conflict ended due to the signing of the Treaty of Ghent in 1815. The gunnery of Hornet proved to be far more effective than Penguin, despite the two vessels being virtually identical in strength.

After exchanges of broadsides and musket fire, the commander of Penguin, James Dickenson, was killed in action. Penguin rammed Hornet in an attempt to board her, but the two ships were separated and Penguin was disabled shortly afterwards when the foremast fell, forcing its crew to surrender. Penguin was too badly damaged to be salvaged and was set ablaze by the crew of Hornet after its stores and surviving crew were removed.

== Background ==
Late in 1814, the United States Navy had been preparing a small squadron at New York City, to attack British shipping in the Indian Ocean. The squadron consisted of the frigate USS President (Captain Stephen Decatur), the sloops of war USS Peacock (Master Commandant Lewis Warrington) and USS Hornet (Master Commandant James Biddle) and the brig-rigged tender USS Tom Bowline.

On 15 January, Decatur took advantage of a north-westerly gale to break out alone in President, but the frigate went aground on the bar at the harbour mouth and received damage which delayed it for two hours and slowed it. Decatur was unable to turn back as the gale was still blowing, and President was captured after being pursued by the four frigates of the blockading British squadron.

The commanders of the other American vessels were not aware of Decatur's fate. When another gale blew up on 22 January, they sailed out in broad daylight under storm canvas and evaded the blockaders through their speed and weatherliness. They made for a pre-arranged rendezvous with President off Tristan da Cunha, which was being used by the Americans as a cruiser base. During the voyage, Hornet lost touch with the other two vessels. Peacock and Tom Bowline reached the rendezvous first, on 18 March, but were then driven off by a gale. Hornet reached the island on 22 March.

== Battle ==
Biddle, commanding Hornet, was about to drop anchor when a strange sail was sighted to the southeast. Biddle at once made for the stranger. This was the Cruizer-class brig-sloop HMS Penguin, commanded by Captain James Dickenson. Penguin was a new vessel, which had first sailed in September 1814. It carried roughly the same armament (sixteen 32-pounder carronades, one 12-pounder long gun and two 6-pounder guns) as Hornet (eighteen 32-pounder carronades and two 12-pounder guns). Some time earlier, Penguin had been sent from Cape Town to hunt an American privateer (Young Wasp) which had been attacking homeward-bound East Indiamen.

As soon as Hornet was sighted, Dickenson steered for the sloop and prepared to engage. Penguin had the weather gage and for a time, Hornet ran before Penguin, yawing occasionally to avoid being raked. Then Penguin turned up-wind to port at almost the same moment as Hornet turned to starboard. The two vessels exchanged broadsides for 15 minutes, with the range gradually closing from "musket shot".

Dickenson turned downwind, to close with Hornet in an attempt to board and capture Hornet, but was mortally wounded. Penguin's bowsprit ran across Hornet's deck between the main and mizzen masts, badly damaging the American rigging. Penguin's crew made no attempt to board Hornet and Hornet's crew prepared to board but Biddle stopped them, to continue the gunnery duel. Biddle believed that the British had surrendered at this point and prepared to step aboard Penguin but was wounded by musket balls.

As the two vessels separated, Penguin's foremast fell, breaking off the bowsprit. The brig had already been severely battered by American shot, and with the brig unable to manoeuvre, Lieutenant McDonald, now in command of Penguin, surrendered. The British had lost 14 men killed and 28 wounded. The brig was "riddled through" and most of the starboard side carronades had been dismounted. By comparison, the Americans had lost only one man killed, one mortally wounded and seven wounded, mostly to musketry. (Penguin had embarked twelve extra Royal Marines in Cape Town.) Strikingly, not a single British carronade shot had hit the hull of Hornet.

== Aftermath ==
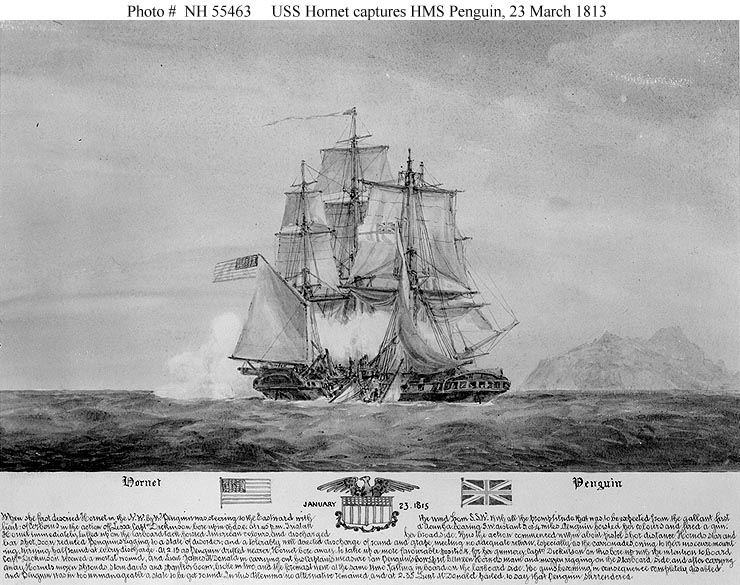
USS Hornet captures HMS Penguin

Penguin was too badly damaged to be repaired and put into service, so the Americans prepared to destroy the brig after removing the stores. Another sail was sighted and the Americans hastily set the Penguin on fire, but the strange sails proved to be Peacock and Tom Bowline.

Tom Bowline was sent to a neutral port (Rio de Janeiro, then part of the Portuguese Empire) with Penguin's crew, where they were escorted ashore by U.S. Marines. They became the last body of British troops and sailors to be taken prisoner during the war.

The two American sloops of war waited in vain for President until 15 April, then headed for the East Indies, as originally intended. On 27 April, they sighted a large ship, which they at first believed to be an East Indiaman, and eagerly headed for it but then realised that their intended victim was a British ship of the line, HMS Cornwallis. The Americans split up. Peacock was the faster of the two sloops and was soon out of sight. Cornwallis had recently been completed at Bombay from teak wood and proved to be very fast and weatherly. Hornet escaped only after a chase lasting two and a half days, during which Biddle had been forced to jettison his stores, ballast, anchors, cables, guns, small arms, capstan, the armourer's anvil, ship's bell and even substantial parts of the forecastle to lighten the sloop enough to outrun Cornwallis.

Since Hornet no longer had any fighting strength, Biddle had to turn home. He reached the Cape of Good Hope on 9 May, where he learned that the Senate had ratified the Treaty of Ghent on 18 February, ending the war more than a month before the engagement with Penguin.

== Printed sources ==
- Elting, John R. (1995). Amateurs to Arms: A Military History of the War of 1812. New York: Da Capo Press. ISBN 0-306-80653-3.
- Forester, C.S. (1956). The Age of Fighting Sail. New English Library. ISBN 0-939218-06-2.
- Roosevelt, Theodore (1882). The Naval War of 1812 Or the History of the United States Navy during the Last War with Great Britain to Which Is Appended an Account of the Battle of New Orleans. New York: Modern Library. ISBN 0-375-75419-9.
