= Capture of USS President =

1815 battle of the War of 1812

- Part of the War of 1812
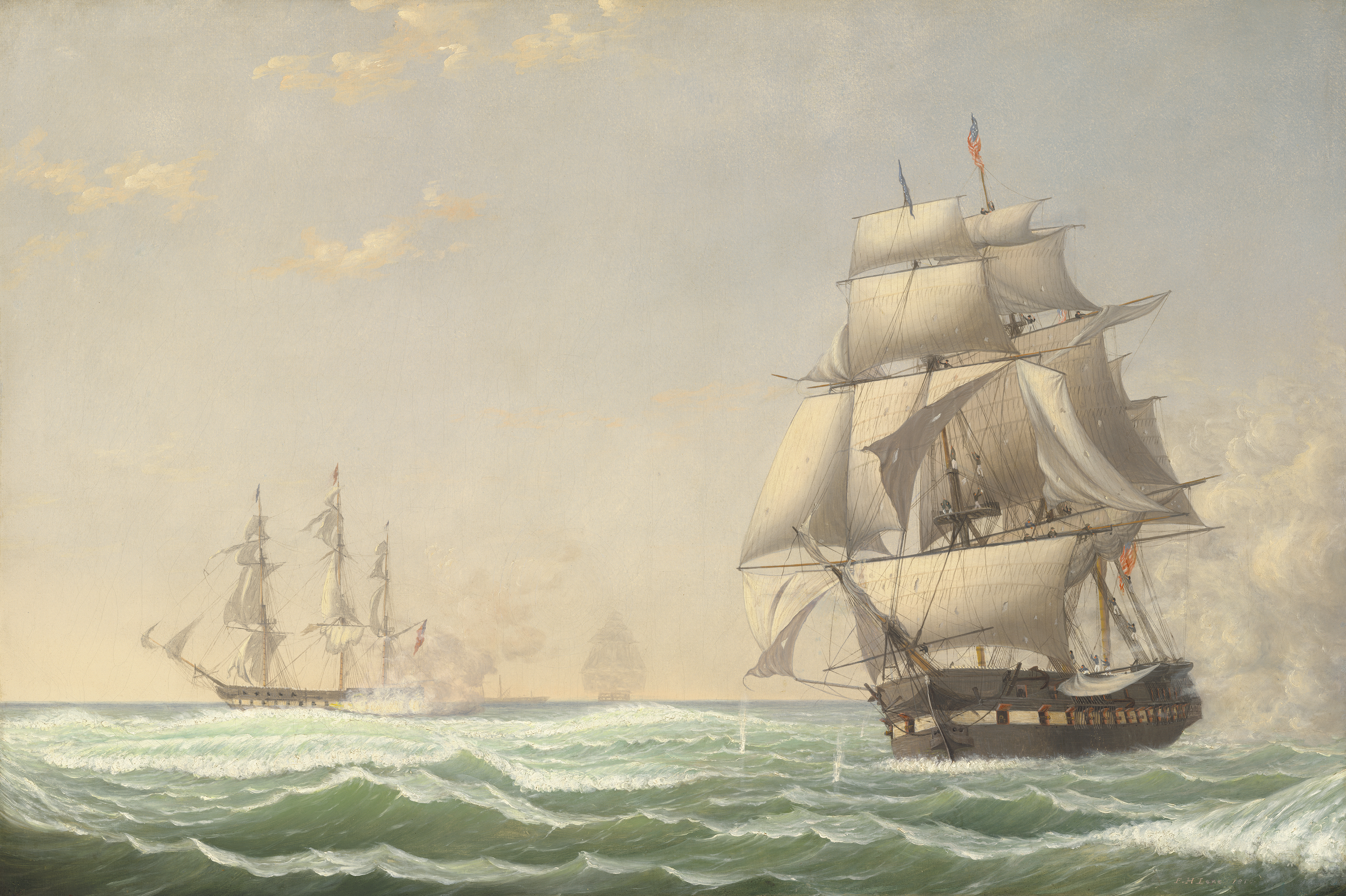
- 1850 painting of the battle
Date	15 January 1815
Location	Outside New York Harbor, Atlantic Ocean 40.509°N 73.943°W
Result	British victory

Belligerents
United Kingdom	United States

Commanders and leaders
John Hayes	Stephen Decatur (surrendered)

Strength
4 frigates	1 frigate

Casualties and losses
11 killed; 14 wounded	35 killed; 70 wounded; 440 captured; 1 frigate captured

The capture of USS President occurred on 15 January 1815 during the War of 1812. USS President, a frigate of the United States Navy, tried to break out of New York Harbor but was intercepted by a Royal Navy squadron of four frigates and forced to surrender.

== Background ==
USS President was a prime target of the Royal Navy during the War of 1812 as it was seen to have insulted British honor after the Little Belt affair. By 1815, Commodore Stephen Decatur commanded President, he had captured the smaller British frigate HMS Macedonian on 25 October 1812, while in command of the frigate USS United States.

Napoleon's failed attempt at invading Russia in 1812 would relieve many British ships from European waters allowing them to impose a strict blockade on the United States. On 1 June 1813, Decatur tried to break out of New York in USS United States and USS Macedonian (which had been taken into the United States Navy), but he encountered a powerful British squadron which drove him into New London, Connecticut. The two frigates were effectively hulked or demilitarized in order to tow them far enough upriver to be safe from British cutting-out expeditions.

Coincidentally, this was the same day of the capture of USS Chesapeake which meant that in one day, nearly half of the United States frigates were incapacitated by British forces. By 1814, the US Navy was entirely contained with the exception of a few sloops. The frigate Essex was captured, the frigates Columbia, Boston, Adams and New York had been destroyed, and United States, Macedonian, Constitution, Congress, Constellation were blockaded. There was no chance of sailing in good weather, the only hope for escape was in the dangerous winter gales when the British forces would be blown offshore. Decatur tried to break out of New London in United States in early 1814, but turned back when he feared that pro-British local civilians were burning blue lights to alert the blockaders. He and his crew of United States were transferred to the faster President, which had been refitted in New York.

Meanwhile, the British squadron blockading New York consisted of the former ship of the line Majestic which had been razeed (cut down) to create a 32-pounder frigate, the 24-pounder frigate HMS Forth, and the 18-pounder frigates HMS Pomone and HMS Tenedos. Commodore John Hayes was in overall command as the captain of Majestic. The 24-pounder frigate HMS Endymion had attempted to cut out (send the boats to board and capture) the privateer Prince de Neufchatel and had lost many of her crew, and Captain Henry Hope had expected to be sent back to Britain as Endymion by that time was an old ship (built in 1797) and her crew had been weakened by the battle. To his surprise, however, Admiral Henry Hotham ordered Endymion to remain on the North American Station as Endymion was the fastest ship in the Royal Navy, and he ordered some replacement crew to be drafted from the 56-gun razee HMS Saturn. Hope went to unusual lengths to train his new crew in anticipation of imminent combat using the same methods as were used by Philip Broke on HMS Shannon. The combination of Endymion's handling, speed, 24-pounder armament and the crew's training meant that she was better prepared for battle than most other frigates. Endymion relieved her newer softwood sister ship Forth from the New York blockade, and Hayes' squadron now consisted of Majestic, Endymion, Pomone, and Tenedos.

== Prelude ==
President was in New York Harbor with the sloops-of-war USS Peacock and USS Hornet, and the schooner-rigged tender USS Tom Bowline. By 1815 President was overdue for repairs. Unlike the other five of the six frigates, President was not fastened with diagonal riders which caused her hull to be prone to hogging and twisting. They were preparing to break out past the British blockade to embark on cruises against British merchant shipping. A blizzard blew up from the northwest on 13 January, and the British ships were blown off their station to the southeast. Decatur determined to take advantage of the situation by breaking out with President alone. (He may have been accompanied by a merchant brig, also named Macedonian, carrying extra rations as a tender, but the brig does not feature in any subsequent events.) The plan was that the smaller warships would break out later and rendezvous with President off Tristan da Cunha in the South Atlantic.

Decatur immediately met with disaster. He had ordered gunboats as harbor pilots to mark the safe passage across the shoal with anchored boats at the mouth of the harbor, but they failed to do so properly and President grounded on the bar and remained stuck there for almost two hours, enduring a pounding from the wind and heavy sea. The frigate was damaged by the time that it was worked free: some copper was stripped away from the hull, the masts were twisted and some of them had developed long cracks. Decatur claimed the hull was twisted, and the bow and stern hogged on the sand bar, although it is likely that this was the case before President had even left port as she was already overdue for repairs. Decatur decided that it was impossible for President to return to port, the wind was still strong. The logs from the British squadron claimed that the gale had stopped, though strong winds persisted. Decatur headed east, keeping close to the Long Island shore before heading southeast.

While President and her crew were struggling to float off the sand bar, the British blockading squadron was fighting to return to their blockading station. As the winds slowed, the British regrouped. Hayes realized that American ships might have taken the opportunity to leave port unobserved, so he left Tenedos to watch the Sandy Hook passage and headed north to watch the Long Island passage, rather than heading back to the harbor entrance.

== Battle ==
The British squadron sighted President at dawn on 14 January. Decatur immediately turned downwind and tried to gain speed by lightening his ship. The winds had waned but they were still strong. In heavy seas and high winds, the largest ship will have the advantage in speed, and Hayes' Majestic gained on President, as they were similar in length but Majestic was considerably heavier. The winds became more moderate at noon. After Majestic had fired some ranging shots which fell short, Pomone overtook Majestic and led the pursuit, but Tenedos appeared unexpectedly to the south and Hayes sent Pomone to investigate in case the sighting was another American ship. HMS Endymion overtook the rest of the British squadron. Endymion was regarded as the fastest ship in the Royal Navy, as she recorded speeds that were faster than clipper ships.

In the afternoon, Endymion and President began exchanging fire using their bow and stern-chase cannon. At 2 pm, Captain Henry Hope took Endymion into position on President's starboard quarter so that none of President's stern chasers could bear. From this position, Hope engaged President with Endymion's single brass 18-pounder bow chaser. Decatur made several attempts to close on Endymion, but he discovered that President's damage limited her maneuverability and exaggerated the advantage in maneuverability of the smaller Endymion.

Faced with this new dilemma, Decatur ordered bar and chain-shot to be fired to disable Endymion's sails and rigging. But President was trapped; Decatur could not escape to the north, as he would have reached the Long Island shore and been forced to the east once more; nor could he escape to the south, as Endymion would most likely slow President enough that the rest of the British squadron would catch up.

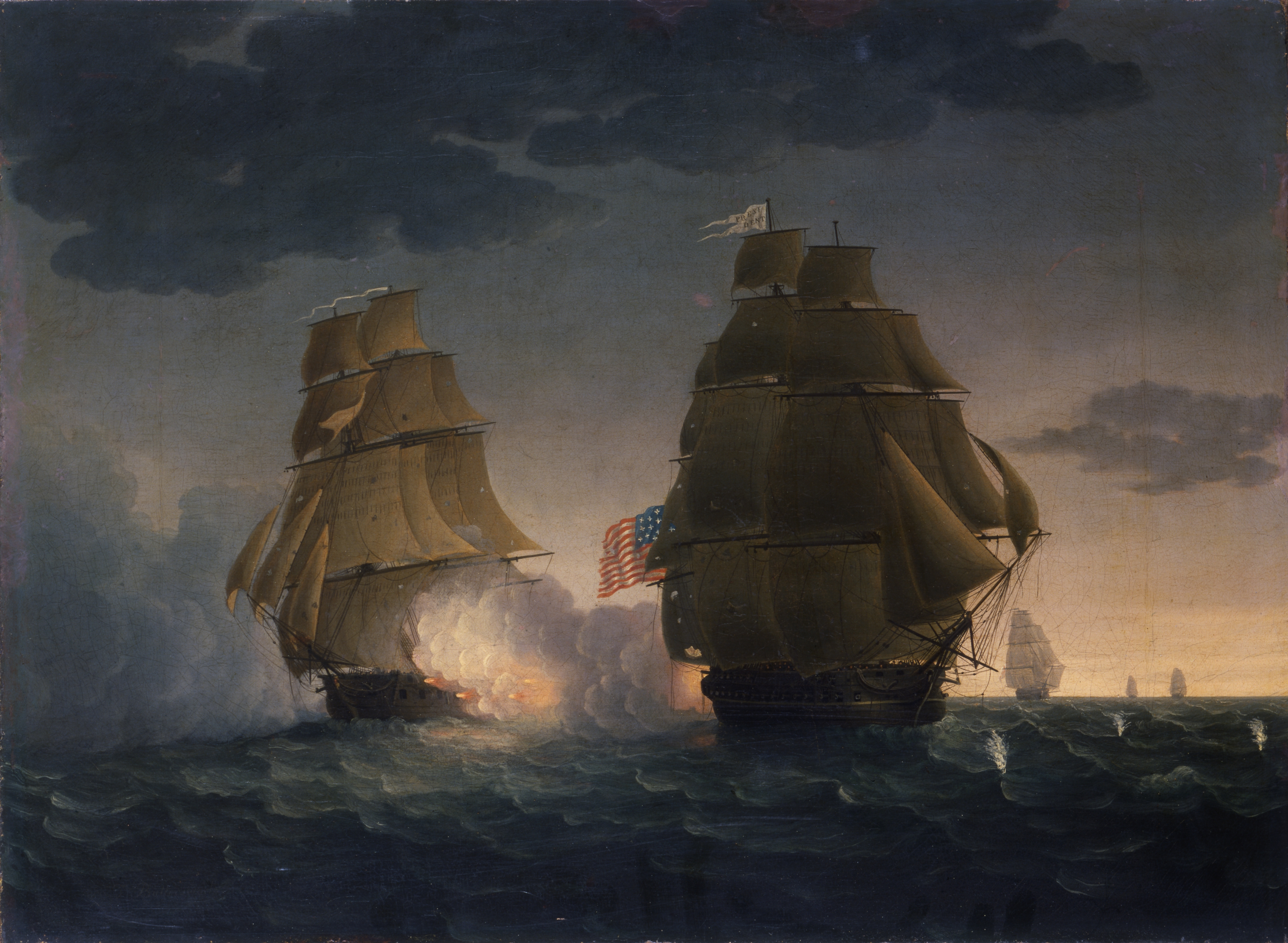
President (right foreground) engages Endymion (left foreground) with her stern chaser

Hope then yawed Endymion to rake President's hull, then quickly returned to position on President's quarter where President's guns would not bear. The first broadside sent splinters flying in the President's spar deck where Decatur was standing. A large splinter hit him in the chest and knocked him over, while another cut his forehead. His First Lieutenant was standing next to him and had his leg cut off by a splinter, and he was knocked down and through the wardroom hatch. Another splinter fatally fractured the skull of a lieutenant next to him too. The 24-pounder cannon from Endymion was more effective than the traditional 18-pounder shot that could not pierce the thick live oak sides of the United States' frigates, and three shots pierced President all the way through to the after powder room which was located beneath her mizzen step.

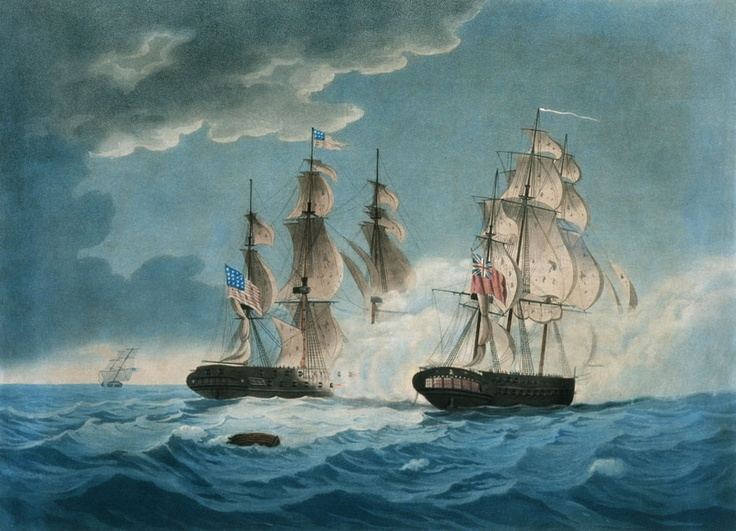
President (left foreground) and Endymion (right foreground) exchanging broadsides and brailing up their spankers at 7 pm

Hope repeated the yawing maneuver three times and did considerable damage. At 7 pm, President brailed up her spanker and wore downwind with Endymion imitating the maneuver. Decatur had hoped to put Endymion out of the chase and escape, but Endymion aimed into President's hull, specifically targeting the gun ports. Many members of President's gun crews were cut down, significantly reducing President's ability to fire back at Endymion. By contrast, President primarily directed her fire at Endymion's rigging in order to slow her down.

President ceased fire at 7:58 pm and hoisted a light in her rigging, indicating that she had surrendered. President's rigging was in a crippled state, and she was slowed to the point that she could not escape from the rest of the British squadron which would soon be in sight. The damage to her hull, however, was far more severe and she had taken on 6 feet (1.8 m) of water in the hold. Her magazine had also been hit; 10 of President's 15 starboard gun ports were hit by shot, and six of the guns were dismounted or damaged.

Following the standard practice, Endymion ceased fire and hove to for repairs once President had surrendered. Endymion could not immediately take possession of her prize, as she had no usable boats; Decatur took advantage of the situation, despite having struck, and made off to escape at 8:30 pm. Endymion hastily completed repairs and resumed the chase at 8:52 pm. At 9:05, Pomone and Tenedos came up with the heavily damaged President, unaware that she had already struck. Pomone fired two ineffective broadsides (there was minimal damage to President's starboard side) into her, following which Decatur hailed to say that he had surrendered. Shortly afterwards, Captain Lumley of Pomone took possession of President. Decatur ordered his sword to be sent to the captain of the "black ship" a reference to Captain Hope of Endymion (which was unusually painted all black which can be seen in all three of the Thomas Buttersworth paintings of the action). According to British accounts, President had lost 35 men killed and 70 wounded, including Decatur; American sources give the losses at 24 killed and 55 wounded. British accounts reported that Endymion had 11 killed and 14 wounded. President had a crew of 480 and a broadside of 816 pounds; Endymion had a crew of 346 and a broadside of 641 pounds.

President (left foreground) having surrendered, Endymion (right foreground) is shown with her fore topmast struck in order to replace the damaged topmast shrouds

Comparison of force (English measurement methods used for both ships)

	HMS Endymion	USS President
Length (gundeck)	159 ft 3 in (48.54 m)	173 ft 3 in (52.81 m)
Beam	42 ft 7 in (12.98 m)	44 ft 4 in (13.51 m)
Tonnage	1277 tons (bm)	1533 tons (bm)
Complement	346 men	at least 458 men
Armament	26 × 24-pounder, 20 × 32-pounder carronades 1 × 18-pounder	32 × 24-pounder 20 × 42-pounder carronades 1 × 24-pounder howitzer
Broadside weight	641 lb (291 kg)	816 lb (370 kg)

== Aftermath ==
The damaged Endymion and President sailed in company to Bermuda. They encountered a violent storm that dismasted both, but both reached safety. Official notification came soon afterwards that the war had ended. Endymion and President arrived at Spithead on 28 March 1815 to a crowd of onlookers who witnessed the disparity in force between the two vessels, and the size of the American 44-gun frigates that had been victorious earlier in the war.

On 18 January 1815 aboard HMS Endymion, Commodore Decatur took time to report to the Secretary of the Navy Benjamin Crowninshield his losses and difficulty in providing exact figures "Of our loss in killed & wounded I am unable to present you a correct statement, the attention of our Surgeon [Dr. Samuel R.Trevett USN] being so on the wounded that he was unable to make a correct return... the enclosed list with the exception I fear of its being short of the [dying] will be found correct."

The British took President briefly into the Royal Navy as the 50-gun (later 60-gun) fourth-rate HMS President but broke up the dilapidated ship in 1818. They later built a 60-gun frigate which they also named President to the exact lines of the captured ship in 1829, despite some elements of the design (countered stern) being obsolete. This ship was used as a political statement as it was commanded by George Cockburn (who led the Burning of Washington) and made flagship of the North American station to remind the United States of its greatest losses during the War of 1812.

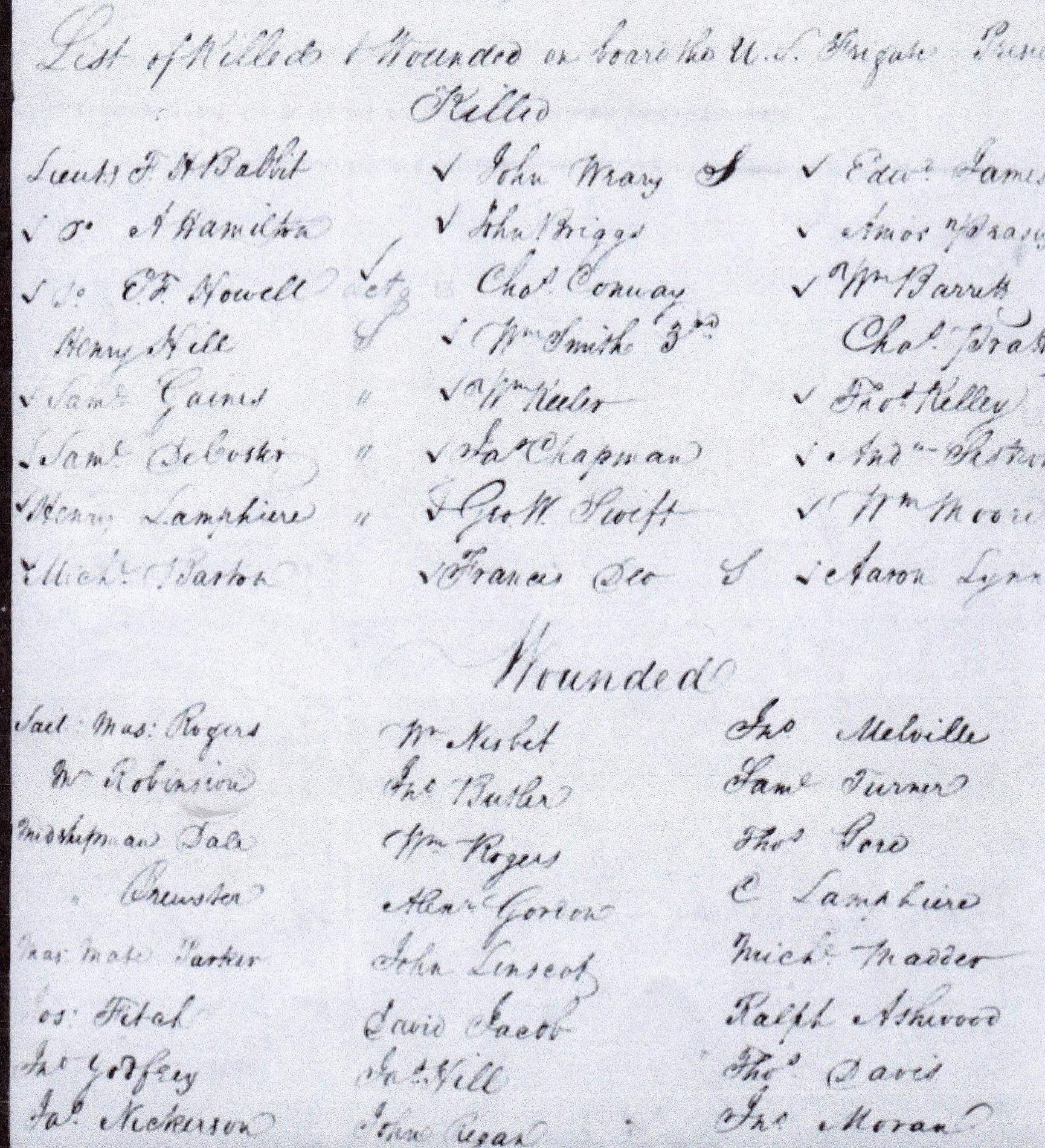
S. Decatur to Secretary of the Navy Benjamin Crowninshield 18 Jan 1815 List of the killed and wounded partial

The smaller American ships still in New York sortied before hearing of the capture of President, and reached the rendezvous off Tristan da Cunha. Hornet managed to sink the brig-sloop HMS Penguin, after which Peacock joined forces with her. The two American ships then mistook the British ship of the line HMS Cornwallis for an East Indiaman. Hornet narrowly escaped after jettisoning all her guns and most of her stores. Peacock subsequently captured several merchant ships in the Indian Ocean until receiving confirmation that the war had ended.

== See also ==
- List of sailing frigates of the United States Navy
- List of ships captured in the 19th century
- Bibliography of early United States naval history

== Bibliography ==
- Cooper, James Fenimore (1856). History of the Navy of the United States of America. Stringer & Townsend, New York. OCLC 197401914.
- Forester, Cecil Scott (1956). The Age of Fighting Sail: The Story of the Naval War of 1812. Doubleday, New York. ISBN 0-939218-06-2.
- James, William (1837). The Naval History of Great Britain, from the Declaration of War by France in 1793, to the Accession of George IV. Vol. 6. R. Bentley.
- Lambert, Andrew (2012). The Challenge – Britain Against America in the War of 1812. Faber and Faber. ISBN 978-0-571-27319-5.
- Roosevelt, Theodore (1883) [1882]. The Naval War of 1812 or The History of the United States Navy during the Last War with Great Britain (3rd ed.). G.P. Putnam's sons, New York. OCLC 133902576.
