= HMS Penguin (1813) =

Brig-sloop of the Royal Navy

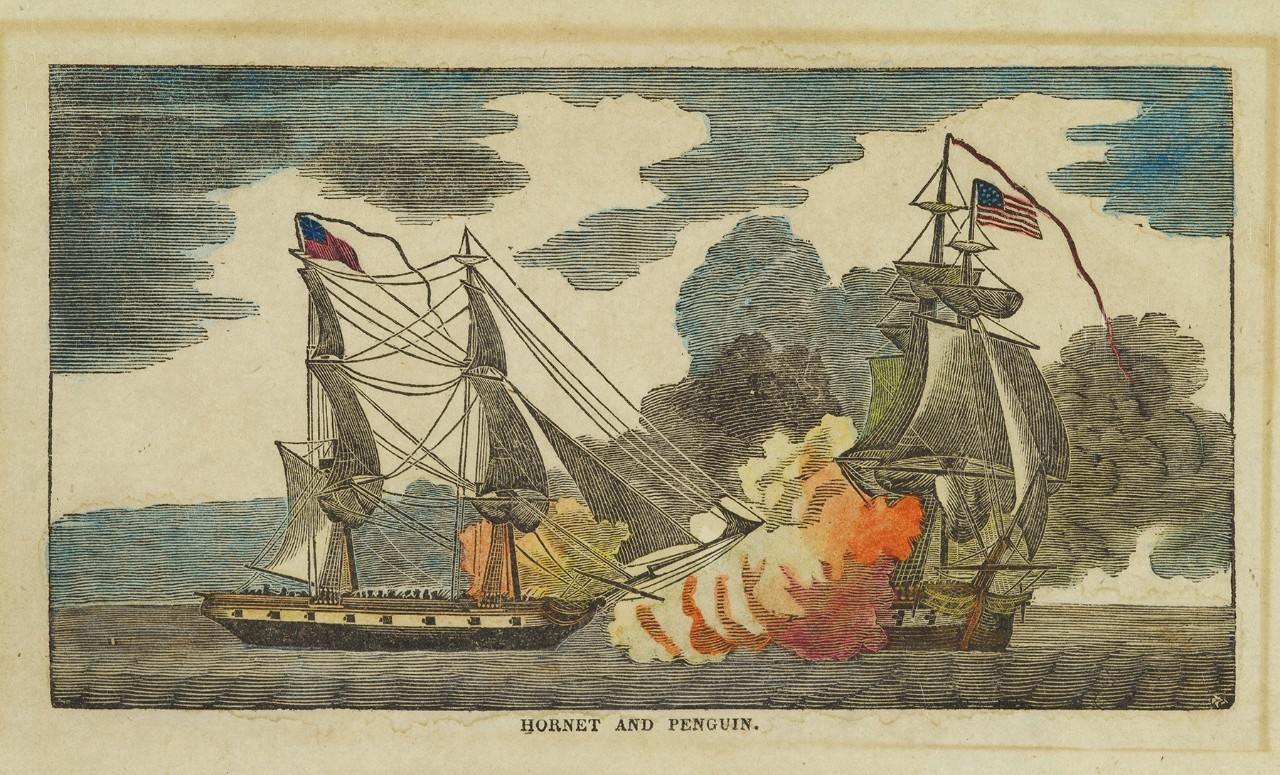
- 1816 engraving of USS Hornet fighting against Penguin (left) by Abel Bowen

History

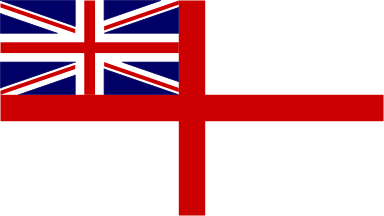
United Kingdom
- Name: HMS Penguin
- Ordered: 20 August 1812
- Builder: William Bottomley, King's Lynn
- Laid down: November 1812
- Launched: 29 June 1813
- Captured: 23 March 1815
- Fate: Scuttled by captors

General characteristics
- Class & type: Cruizer-class brig-sloop
- Tons burthen: 386 79/94 (bm)
- Length: 100 ft 5 in (30.6 m) (overall); 77 ft 6 1/2 in (23.6 m) (keel)
- Beam: 30 ft 7 1/2 in (9.3 m)
- Draught: 6 ft 7 in (2.0 m) (unladen); 11 ft 8 in (3.6 m) (laden)
- Depth of hold: 11 ft 8 in (3.6 m)
- Propulsion: Sails
- Sail plan: Brig
- Complement: 121
- Armament: 16 × 32-pounder carronades; 2 × 6-pounder bow guns; 1 × 12-pounder carronade

HMS Penguin was an 18-gun Cruizer-class brig-sloop of the Royal Navy launched in 1813. In 1815 USS Hornet captured Penguin in a battle that took place after the end of the War of 1812. Hornet then scuttled Penguin as she was too damaged to merit keeping.

== Service ==
Penguin was commissioned in November 1813 under Commander Thomas R. Toker. The next month Commander George A. Byron took over command. In June 1814 command transferred to Commander James Dickinson.

On 23 March 1815 Penguin encountered USS Hornet off Tristan da Cunha. In the ensuing single ship action, Penguin lost 10 men killed, including Dickinson, and had 28 wounded; she struck her colours after 22 minutes of combat. By contrast, the Americans only suffered one man killed and nine wounded, including Hornet's captain, James Biddle. The Americans scuttled Penguin the next day as she was too damaged to keep.

The two vessels had been relatively evenly matched. Hornet had a slightly heavier armament as she had 20 cannon, two 12-pounder guns as bow chasers and eighteen 32-pounder carronades. She also had a crew of 146 officers and men, including 20 US Marines, less a prize crew that she had despatched. Penguin's crew numbered 132 and included 12 extra Royal Marines.

However, what had proved decisive was the Americans' better gunnery. Most of Hornet's casualties were due to musketry fire from Penguin, i.e., from the Royal Marines, Penguin's gunnery was abysmal as no cannon shots had hit Hornet.

== Aftermath ==
The war had already ended at the time of the engagement, but none of the vessels had received the news. Shortly after the fight, Peacock and Tom Bowline rendezvoused with Hornet at Tristan da Cunha. Tom Bowline embarked Penguin's crew and took the prisoners to Rio de Janeiro, Brazil, where they received the news of the treaty. The crew arrived at Bahia on 26 April.

== See also ==
- Capture of HMS Penguin
