= USS Hornet (1805) =

US Navy brig commissioned in 1805

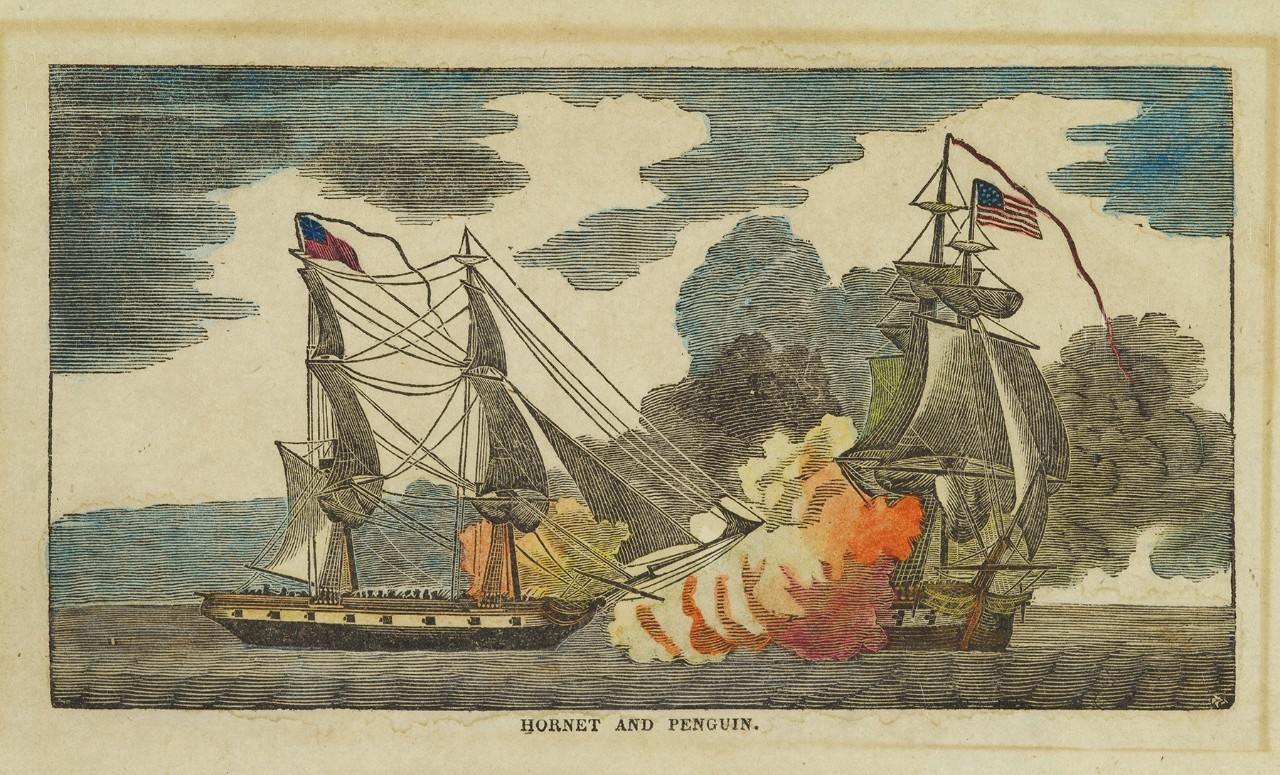
- 1816 engraving of Hornet (right) fighting against HMS Penguin by Abel Bowen

History

United States
- Name: USS Hornet
- Cost: $52,603
- Launched: 28 July 1805
- Commissioned: 18 October 1805
- Fate: Sunk in a storm, 10 September 1829 in Tampico, Mx.

General characteristics
- Type: Sloop-of-war
- Tonnage: 440
- Length: 106 ft 9 in (32.5 m)
- Beam: 31 ft 5 in (9.6 m)
- Draft: 14 ft (4.3 m)
- Propulsion: Sail
- Armament: 18 × 32-pounder carronades; 2 × 12-pounder long guns

USS Hornet was a 20-gun sloop-of-war of the United States Navy. (Note: Not to be confused with the Sloop-of-War Hornet, acquired by the U.S. Navy in 1805.) During the War of 1812, she was the first U.S. Navy ship to capture a British privateer.

== Design ==
Hornet was launched 28 July 1805 in Baltimore and commissioned there on 18 October, Master Commandant Isaac Chauncey in command.

Hornet's design was a compromise between the six original U.S. frigates and coastal gunboats championed by President Thomas Jefferson. The fledgling Navy needed a light-draft vessel that was fast and maneuverable, but also possessing sufficient firepower to deter or defeat enemy ships. Hornet's design is attributed to Josiah Fox, but her builder, William Price, is said to have altered it based on the successful lines of the Baltimore Clipper, of which he had significant experience.

During his time as captain, Chauncey reported significant problems with Hornet's rigging, hindering her overall potential. In response to these reports, Hornet's sister ship, Wasp, constructed at the Washington Navy Yard, had her rigging changed to three masts and afterward reported excellent performance at sea.

== 1806–1812 ==
Hornet cruised the Atlantic coast until 29 March 1806 when she sailed to join the squadron protecting American commerce from threats of piracy in the Mediterranean. She returned to Charleston, South Carolina on 29 November 1807 and was decommissioned.

Hornet was recommissioned on 26 December 1808. She transported General James Wilkinson to New Orleans, Louisiana, cruised in home waters to enforce the Embargo Act, and carried dispatches to Holland, France, and England. From November 1810 to September 1811, Hornet was rebuilt in the Washington Navy Yard. Based on the success of Wasp, Hornet received a ship-rig with three masts carrying square sails. She also had two additional gun ports fitted, which increased her capacity to 20 guns. Instead of her original eighteen 9-pounder long guns, Hornet was fitted to carry eighteen 32-pounder carronades and two 12-pounder long guns.

== War of 1812 ==
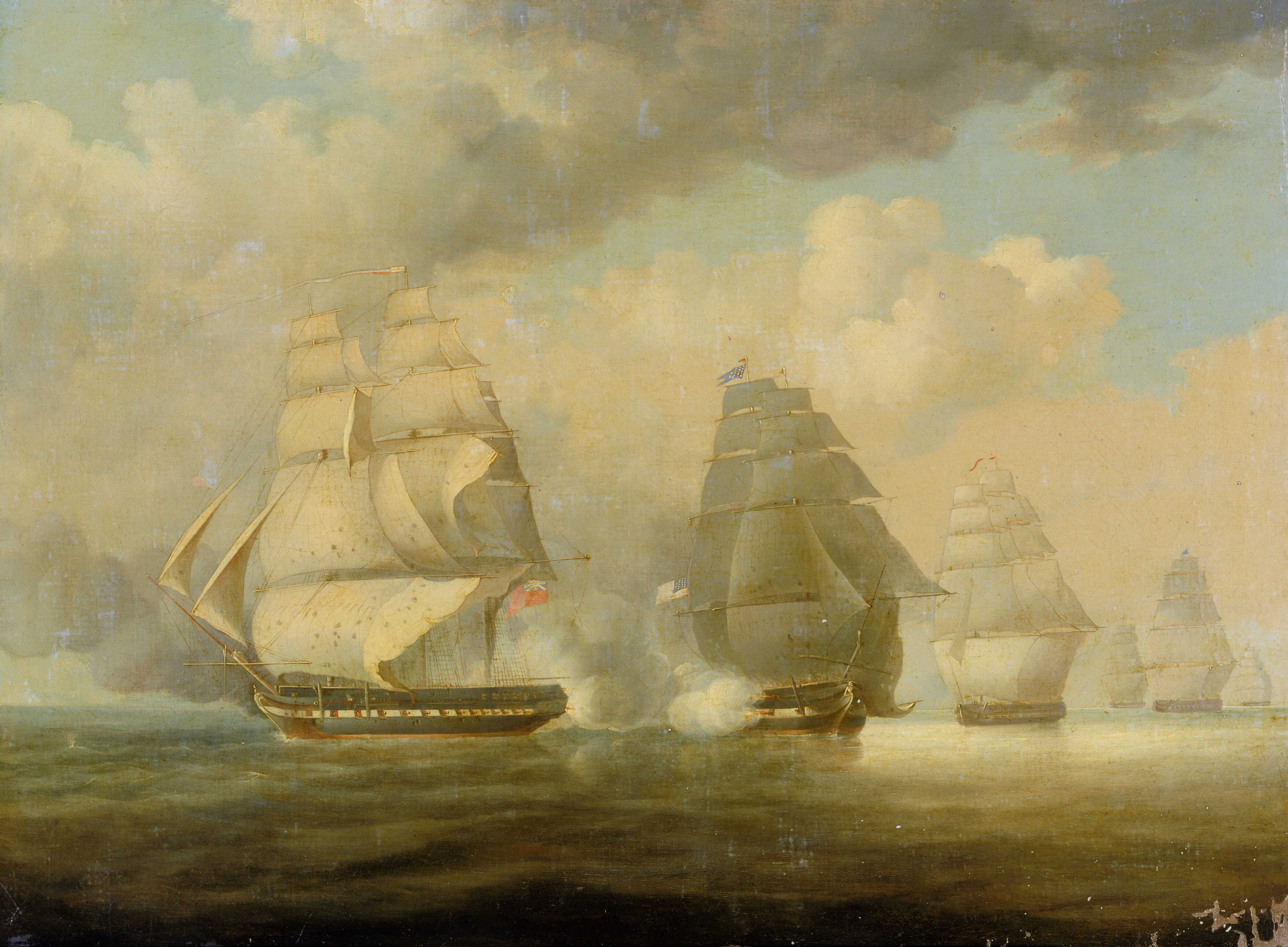
Escape of HMS Belvidera, 23 June 1812, Chasing her are the Congress, United States, Hornet and Argus

At the outbreak of war, Hornet sailed under the command of Master Commandant James Lawrence. It was Hornet that carried the diplomatic messages from Britain, notifying the United States that the Royal Navy would continue impressing alleged deserters from American merchantmen. Lawrence then sailed Hornet with Commodore John Rodgers' Squadron on a raiding voyage to South America. It was during this voyage when the privateer Dolphin was captured on 9 July 1812 — the first prize of the war taken by a naval vessel — which was subsequently recaptured by the British while en route to the United States.

In October, Hornet sailed south with Constitution, under Commodore William Bainbridge, to harass British shipping. In December, Lawrence spotted and blockaded HMS Bonne Citoyenne in the harbor at Salvador, Brazil. When Montague (74 guns) arrived and broke the blockade, Lawrence shifted his efforts to the Caribbean.

On 24 February 1813, Hornet engaged HMS Peacock off Demerary (Guyana). Hornet forced Peacock, which had lost her captain and taken heavy casualties, to strike, but Peacock was so damaged that she sank shortly thereafter. Hornet then returned to New London, Connecticut. Lloyd's List initially reported that Captain Peake of Peacock and eight of her crew were killed in the action, and 27 were wounded; 19 men, who could not be rescued, went down with her when she sank, but Hornet rescued the rest. She herself had reportedly lost only one man killed and two wounded. She then arrived at Martha's Vineyard on 19 March.

Hornet was then assigned to a squadron consisting of the frigates United States and Macedonian under the command of Commodore Stephen Decatur. The squadron was chased into the Thames River near New London and was blockaded. Hornet was able to escape from the blockade and resumed active service. The other two ships remained under blockade until the end of the war.

On 14 November 1814, under new command, Hornet sailed on a second raiding voyage to the South Atlantic. On 23 March 1815, she captured HMS Penguin in a short battle off Tristan da Cunha. This was one of several naval engagements that took place after the war had ended. On 27 April, she engaged HMS Cornwallis, having mistakenly identified her as a merchant vessel. Hornet managed to escape by throwing overboard boats, guns, and other equipment so to enable higher speed.

== Loss ==
Following the war, Hornet cruised to the West Indies and Copenhagen in 1818; and, in 1819, to the Mediterranean. Hornet was later based at Key West and Pensacola, Florida to help end combat in the Caribbean Sea. She captured the pirate schooner Moscow 29 October 1821 off the coast of Santo Domingo.

She cruised throughout the Caribbean throughout the 1820s. In July 1822 under Captain Henley, Hornet was involved in action against Captain Paez as part of operations to suppress the illicit slave trade. General Paez had captured Theodore, carrying Africans from the West coast of Africa. Hornet in turn captured this ship and took it to the Spanish port Havana, Cuba.

She departed Pensacola for the last time on 4 March 1829, setting course for the coast of Mexico, and was never seen again. On 27 October 1829, the commander of the West Indies Squadron received information that Hornet had been dismasted in a gale off Tampico on 10 September 1829 and had foundered with the loss of all hands.

== Bibliography ==
- Cooper, James Fenimore (1826). History of the Navy of the United States of America. New York: Stringer & Townsend. OCLC 197401914.
- Harris, Gardner W. (1837). The life and services of Commodore William Bainbridge, United States navy. Philadelphia: Carey Lea & Blanchard. ISBN 0-945-72658-9. Archived from the original on 31 July 2009.
- James, William; Chamier, Frederick (1837). The naval history of Great Britain: from the declaration of war by France in 1793 to the accession of George IV. Vol. 6. London: Richard Bentley.
- Roosevelt, Theodore (1900). The Naval War of 1812. New York: G. P. Putnam and Sons. ISBN 0-375-75419-9.
