= Elizabeth Jaquelin Ambler Brent Carrington =

American philanthropist (1765–1842)

Elizabeth Jaquelin Ambler Brent Carrington also known as Betsy Ambler Carrington (March 11, 1765 – February 15, 1842) founded the Female Humane Association (now known as the Memorial Foundation for Children) in Richmond, Virginia. Believed to be the first of its kind in Virginia, the organization provided safety and shelter to destitute girls and kept them from a life of poverty and the possibility of becoming prostitutes to survive.

She corresponded with friends and family over the course of her life and her letters and papers are held at the Library of Congress, Mount Vernon, Colonial Williamsburg Foundation, and the University of Virginia. In them, she describes her life as a child, her short-lived marriage to William Brent, who died suddenly months after their marriage, and her second husband Edward Carrington. She corresponded with and wrote about Chief Justice John Marshall, George and Martha Washington, her sisters, and other friends and relatives.

== Early life ==
Elizabeth Jaquelin "Betsy" Ambler, the daughter of Rebecca Burwell Ambler and Jaquelin Ambler, was born in Yorktown, Virginia, on March 11, 1765. Her father, uncles and grandfather were prosperous merchants, though all but her father had died by 1769. During the American Revolutionary War, her family moved away from their homes, warehouses and plantations in what became strategic port areas to avoid the conflict. Nonetheless her father returned to serve on the state's Naval Board and later on the Council of State in Richmond. He moved his family there and in 1782 he became state treasurer. During the war, the Amblers downsized from a mansion to a small frame house in Richmond, a small town at that time. Rebecca Burwell had been Thomas Jefferson's sweetheart. She turned him down to marry Jaquelin Ambler.

The Amblers had eight children. Four daughters survived childhood, Elizabeth (Betsy), Mary (Polly), Ann (Nancy), and Lucy. Her father educated her and her sisters at home. Carrington believed in the importance of education for women and she read books on a wide-range of subjects.

She describes her recollections of education in a letter to her sister Nancy in 1807:

Thus did our dear father devote himself to us and pursue every means in his power to give us instruction at a time when girls in our country were simply taught to read and write at twenty-five pounds and a load of wool per year... Such attentions as we experienced were without parallel.

Two of her sisters married John Marshall and Daniel Call, both of whom were prominent attorneys in Richmond. Her sister Mary was courted by and then married to John Marshall. Although he was thin with a "rustic" bearing, Mary "saw in the young captain that nobility of character and exceedingly happy and sunny and lovable nature upon which [James] Monroe and his other comrades had long remarked." He fascinated the entire Ambler family.

She was an Episcopalian.

== Marriage ==
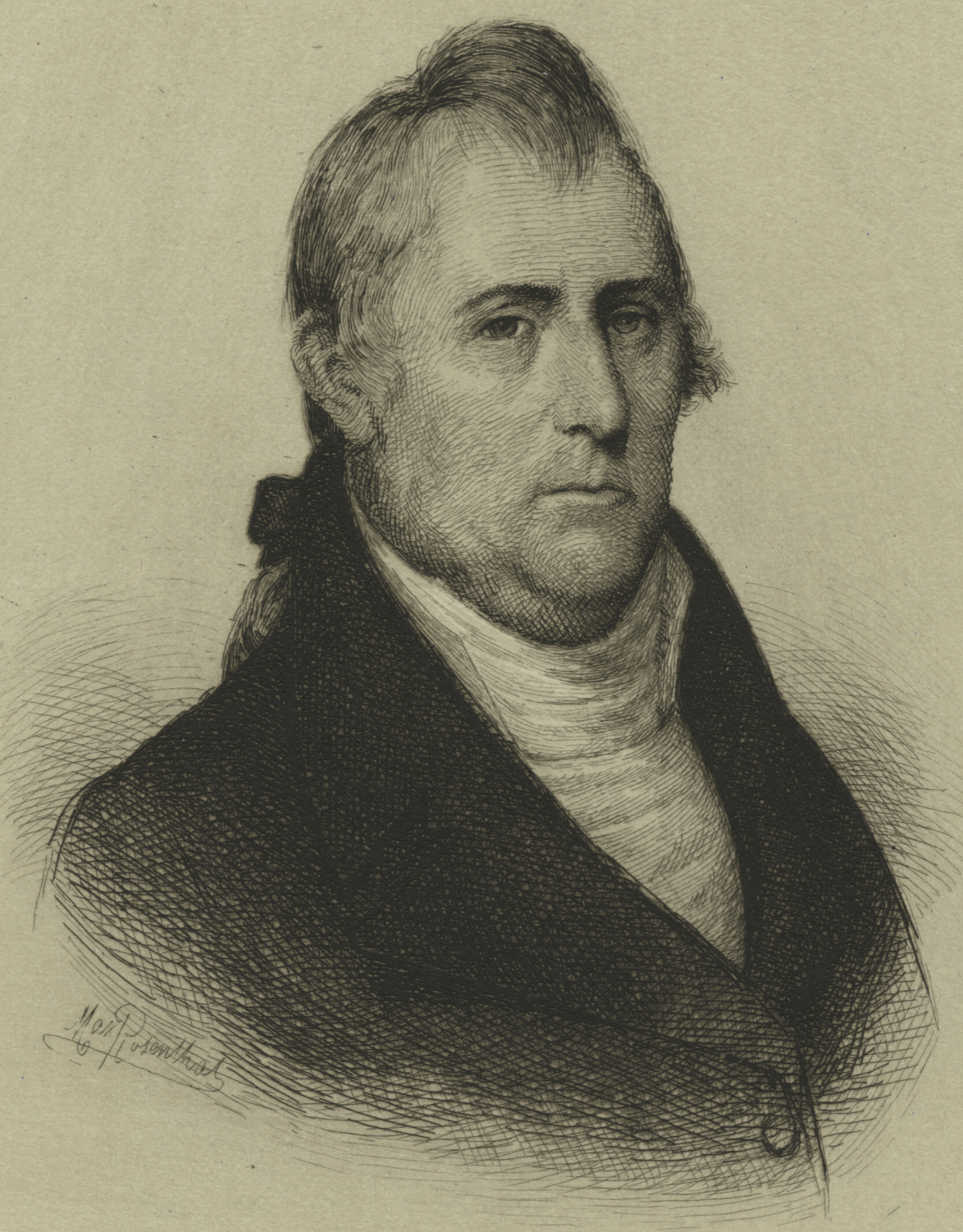
Lieutenant Colonel Edward Carrington, member of the Continental Congress and husband of Elizabeth Jacquelin Ambler Brent Carrington

Betsey Ambler first married William Brent of Stafford County, Virginia, on March 31, 1785. Their marriage license was issued by lawyer John Marshall, her brother-in-law. However, Brent died suddenly about three months later on June 15, 1785. Over six months in 1785, she wrote to her friend Mildred Smith of the courtship with Brent, how well he became acquainted with her family, being "the happiest of wives", and then having become "widowed, wretched, forlorn" upon the death of her husband.

The young widow next married a good friend of her and her first husband, Edward Carrington, on December 8, 1792. Like William Brent, Carrington was a friend of George Washington, whom the Carringtons visited a month before Washington's death. However, again Betsy Carrington did not have any children. Her husband died on October 28, 1810. Through her marriages, she became connected to other leading families of Virginia.

== American Revolutionary War ==
In a letter to her sister Nancy in 1807, she shared her recollections of the time of "great confusion" of the American Revolutionary War when almost all of the men were away at war and churches were boarded up. The town had become a garrison and their father was away most of the time in Williamsburg. Her sense of security came from living next door to Colonel Marshall, the commanding officer, and father of John Marshall, who was a captain during the war.

During the war, women had to step outside of their traditional roles of homemakers and care-givers to assume male roles.

When Betsy Ambler Brent looked back on her youth from the perspective of 1810, she observed, "Necessity taught us to use exertions which our girls of the present day know nothing of."

— Mary Beth Norton, who completed studies of women during the American Revolutionary War

== Female Humane Association ==
About 1805, she co-founded the Female Humane Association of Richmond to aid female orphans. That year, Jean Moncure Wood, wife of former governor James Wood, and Mary Spear Nicholas, wife of the state's attorney general, Philip Norbone Nicholas, and Carrington drew up a constitution and bylaws for the organization. Carrington was likely spurred on to do this because of her memory of Rachel Warrington and her religious beliefs and belief in the importance of education for girls and women. It may have been the first of its kind in Virginia.

By December 1810, there were 27 other women who became members of the organization. In January 1811 a petition for an act of incorporation passed in the Virginia General Assembly. The association was established by women and only sought female trustees, who were given the legal rights to enter into contracts, bring suits in court, and buy and sell property. At that time, married women did not have these legal rights. Carrington was secretary of the association by 1811 and until 1837.

In 1813, an orphanage was built to provide safety, shelter and education for girls, which prevented them from living in poverty and possibly becoming prostitutes to support themselves. Although there was success initially, during the 1820s they had to cut their budget by reducing the number of orphans they could take in and limiting the services offered to destitute white girls. They organized an annual fund-raising fair beginning in 1828. The organization changed over time, resulting finally as the Memorial Foundation for Children. In 2002, more than $905,000 was provided by the organization to educational and cultural programs.

== William Caswell ==
William Caswell was a former enslaved man, who became her driver in early 1834. He aided her in her duties for the organization and she successfully arranged for him to remain in Virginia by petitioning the General Assembly.

Being free was made difficult for African Americans. They lived a fine line between being separate from enslaved blacks and unable to easily assimilate into white neighborhoods. It was not easy to find jobs. African Americans paid higher taxes than white couples, because all African American women were taxed. It was also difficult for them to stay in Virginia after they were freed. Beginning at the turn of the eighteenth century, rights to vote and other rights were restricted by law. They could not hold an office that gave them any power over white people. Free blacks were suspected of helping enslaved people escape, and were therefore suspect in the community. There were laws that made it more difficult for slaveholders to manumit slaves and they were to leave Virginia within six months of being freed.

== Death ==
Carrington died on February 15, 1842, in Richmond. She was likely buried in the Saint John's Episcopal Church of Richmond, next to her second husband. An obituary in the Richmond Enquirer stated that "Her intelligent and cultivated mind; her generous heart; her active and diffusive charity, of which the Female Humane Association of Richmond furnishes one enduring memorial"; and her "practical piety" made her one of Virginia's most "distinguished women."

== Legacy ==
She was a 2013 Virginia Women in History honoree, Library of Virginia, and with other notable women of Richmond, the site of her former home is on an audio tour Virginia Women in History – Richmond City:

Elizabeth Ambler Brent Carrington, whose home stood at the southeast corner of Clay and 11th Streets, was concerned about the plight of orphaned girls early in the 19th century and helped establish the Female Humane Association of the City of Richmond at a time when women rarely played a role in public affairs.

Her papers are held among several collections:

- Negative photocopies of her papers—including correspondence with John Marshall, George Washington, and her husbands—are held at the Library of Congress, Washington, D.C.
- Her correspondence with John Marshall is held in the Albert Jeremiah Beveridge collection of John Marshall papers at the Library of Congress.
- Additional correspondence is held at the Mount Vernon estate library. It includes letters written by Carrington from 1780, when she was unmarried and signed her letters Betsy Ambler, until 1823. It includes letters to her sister Nancy and her friend Mildred Smith. One of the letters is written from Mount Vernon in November 1799, a month before the death of George Washington.
- Another set of correspondence is held by the John D. Rockefeller, Jr. Library of the Colonial Williamsburg Foundation in Williamsburg, Virginia. They are Carrington's personal copies of letters that she sent to others. It includes letters to her sister Ann Amber Fisher and her friends Francis Caines of Bristol, England and Mildred Smith Dudley of Yorktown, Virginia. The letters describe the difficulties during the American Revolutionary War during the flight from the British and the post-war effects. There are also letters about the unfortunate life of a friend and the death of her first husband. There are also letters about John A.B. Fisher, as he considers entering the ministry, and brother-in-law Chief Justice John Marshall.
- Letters of Betsy Ambler Carrington are held at the Alderman Library of the University of Virginia.
