= Duck (ship) =

Several vessels have been named Duck for the duck:

- Duck, of 110 tons (bm), P.Billings, master, was a foreign-built brig. She was a Liverpool-based coaster that was driven ashore on 10 November 1810 and wrecked at Padstow. She was on a voyage from St. Agnes, Cornwall to Newport, Monmouthshire.
- Duck (1812 ship) was launched in Boston in 1804, presumably under another name. She was taken in prize in 1812 and became a British merchantman. She spent much of her career sailing between Britain and Newfoundland. In 1813, an American privateer captured her, but then a Royal Navy brig recaptured her. At the end of the year, French frigates captured Duck, but released her. She was wrecked on 15 October 1829.
- Duck (1813 ship) was launched at Stettin, probably under another name. She became a British merchant vessel circa 1813. The USS Peacock captured Duck off the coast of Africa, took off her crew, and sank her.
