= 1797 Virginia gubernatorial election =

- November 30, 1797
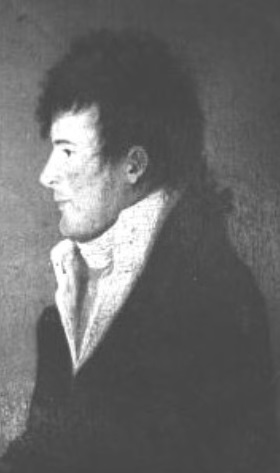

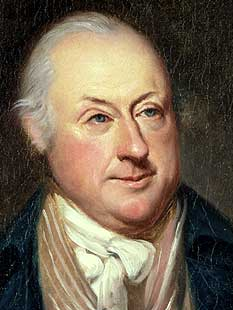
| Nominee | James Wood | John Page |
| 1st ballot | 116 | 38 |
Governor before election
James Wood
Democratic-Republican
Elected Governor
James Wood
Democratic-Republican (Note: Lampi does not include parties for this election, but lists Wood as a Federalist in 1794. Sobel and Raimo list Wood as a Democratic-Republican during his tenure.)

A gubernatorial election was held in Virginia on December 7, 1797. The incumbent governor of Virginia James Wood defeated the U.S. representative from Virginia's 12th congressional district John Page.

Wood had earned the displeasure of his fellow Democratic-Republicans for his inaction in the face of the Alien and Sedition Acts. Some Democratic-Republicans preferred to support the former U.S. minister to France James Monroe, an outspoken critic of the legislation. Monroe, however, declined to challenge Wood, in deference to the custom that incumbent governors eligible for re-election be allowed to run unopposed.

The election was conducted by the Virginia General Assembly in joint session. Wood was elected with a majority on the first ballot.

== General election ==
1797 Virginia gubernatorial election
| Candidate | First ballot | |
| Candidate | Count | Percent |
|---|---|---|
| James Wood (incumbent) | 116 | 75.32 |
| John Page | 38 | 24.68 |
| Total | 154 | 100.00 |

== Bibliography ==
- Ammon, Harry (1971). James Monroe: The Quest for National Identity. New York: McGraw Hill Book Company.
- Headlee, Thomas J. Jr. (1976). Journal of the Senate of Virginia: Session of 1797/98. Richmond: Virginia State Library.
- Lampi, Philip J. (2012). "Virginia 1797 Governor". A New Nation Votes. American Antiquarian Society.
- Sobel, Robert; Raimo, John (1978). Biographical Directory of the Governors of the United States 1789–1978. Vol. 4. Westport, CT: Meckler Books.
