= Warrington (disambiguation) =

Warrington is a large town in Cheshire, England, formerly in Lancashire.

Warrington may also refer to:

== Places ==
=== Other places in England ===
- Warrington, Buckinghamshire, a village in South East England
- Warrington (UK Parliament constituency), a former parliamentary constituency
- Borough of Warrington, a district of Cheshire
- The Warrington, Maida Vale, a public house in London

=== In New Zealand ===
- Warrington, New Zealand, a seaside village in the City of Dunedin in the South Island

=== In the United States ===
- Warrington, Florida
- Warrington, Indiana
- Warrington, New Jersey
- Warrington Township, Bucks County, Pennsylvania
- Warrington Township, York County, Pennsylvania

== People ==
=== Surname ===
- Charles Warrington (born 1971), American professional wrestler
- Don Warrington (born 1951), British actor
- Eirlys Warrington (born 1942), British nurse
- Freda Warrington (born 1956), British writer
- George Warrington (1952–2007), American transportation executive
- Josh Warrington (born 1990), British professional boxer
- Lewis Warrington (United States Navy officer) (1782–1851), American naval officer
- Marisa Warrington (born 1973), Australian actress
- Otilio Warrington (born 1944), Puerto Rican comedian
- Percy Warrington (1889–1961), British vicar and educationist
- Marnie Hughes-Warrington (born 1970), Australian historian

=== Given name ===
- Warrington Colescott (1921–2018), American artist
- Warrington Hudlin (born 1952), American film director
- George Warrington Steevens (1869–1900), British journalist

=== Title ===
- Baron Warrington of Clyffe
- Baron Hoyle of Warrington
- Earl of Warrington

=== Fictional characters ===
- Andrew Warrington
- Luke Warrington
- Nikki Warrington
- Sara Warrington

== Other ==
- USS Warrington, the name of several American naval ships
- USLHT Warrington, was an American lighthouse tender ship
- Warrington Wizards (formerly Warrington Woolston Rovers), a rugby league team
- Warrington Wolves, a rugby league team
- Warrington College of Business at the University of Florida
- Warrington bombings, civilian attacks in Warrington, England, during the Troubles
- Warrington hammer, a type of hammer used by woodworkers

== See also ==
- Warington Baden-Powell, founder of Sea Scouting
- Warington Wilkinson Smyth, a British geologist
