= 1796 Virginia gubernatorial election =

- November 25, 1796 (1st ballot); December 6, 1796 (2nd ballot)
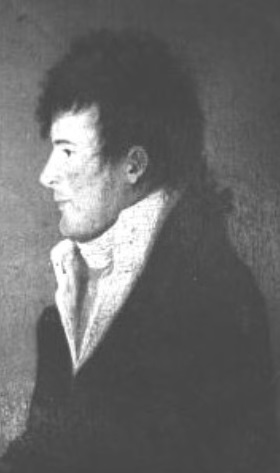

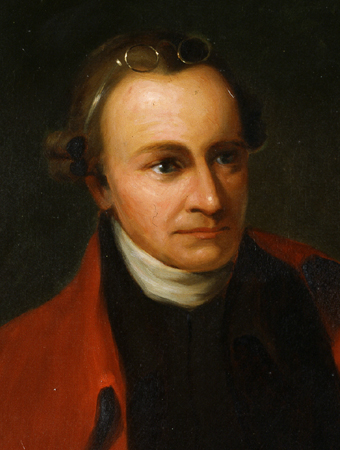
Nominee	James Wood	Thomas Madison	Patrick Henry
1st ballot	75	—	94 (Note: Declined)
2nd ballot	115	56	—
Governor before election
Robert Brooke
Democratic-Republican
Elected Governor
James Wood
Democratic-Republican (Note: Lampi does not include information about parties for this election, but lists Wood as a Federalist in 1794. Sobel and Raimo state that Wood was elected and served as a Democratic-Republican.)

A gubernatorial election was held in Virginia on November 25 and December 6, 1796. The member of the Council of State James Wood defeated the member of the Virginia House of Delegates from Botetourt County Thomas Madison.

The Democratic-Republican incumbent governor of Virginia Robert Brooke retired in order to seek election as attorney general of Virginia. The election was conducted by the Virginia General Assembly in joint session. The former governor Patrick Henry defeated Wood on the first ballot, but declined to serve. The General Assembly met again on December 6 and elected Wood with a majority on the second ballot.

== General election ==
1796 Virginia gubernatorial election
Candidate	First ballot		Second ballot	
Candidate	Count	Percent	Count	Percent
Patrick Henry	94	55.62	Declined	
James Wood	75	44.38	115	66.09
Thomas Madison	—N/a		56	32.18
Beverley Randolph	—N/a		2	1.15
William Clarke	—N/a		1	0.57
Total	169	100.00	174	100.00

== Bibliography ==
- Lampi, Philip J. (2012a). "Virginia 1796 Governor". A New Nation Votes. American Antiquarian Society.
- Lampi, Philip J. (2012b). "Virginia 1796 Governor, Ballot 2". A New Nation Votes. American Antiquarian Society.
- Sobel, Robert; Raimo, John (1978). Biographical Directory of the Governors of the United States 1789–1978. Vol. 4. Westport, CT: Meckler Books.
