= Beverley Randolph =

American politician (1754–1797)

8th Governor of Virginia
- In office December 1, 1788 – December 1, 1791
- Preceded by: Edmund Randolph
- Succeeded by: Henry Lee III

Member of the Virginia House of Delegates for Cumberland County
- In office May 3, 1779-May 6, 1781 Serving with George Carrington
- Preceded by: Joseph Carrington
- Succeeded by: Creed Haskins
- In office May 5, 1777-May 3, 1778 Serving with William Fleming, Joseph Carrington
- Preceded by: John Mayo
- Succeeded by: George Carrington

Personal details
- Born: 1754 Henrico County, Colony of Virginia, British America
- Died: February 7, 1797 (aged 42–43) Cumberland County, Virginia, U.S.
- Resting place: Westview Cemetery, Farmville, Virginia, U.S.
- Spouse: Martha Cocke (m. 1775)
- Children: Lucy
- Relatives: William Randolph II (grandfather)
- Education: The College of William and Mary

Beverley Randolph (1754 – February 7, 1797) was a planter and politician from Virginia. After leading his county militia during the American Revolutionary War, Randolph served in the Virginia House of Delegates several times, each time representing Cumberland County, before fellow legislators elected him as the eighth governor of Virginia (1788-1791).

== Early and family life ==
Coat of Arms of William Randolph

Randolph was the second son of four children born to Lucille Bolling and her husband, Peter Randolph, a customs collector and clerk of the House of Burgesses, who was the son of William Randolph II. Yorkshire emigrant Willliam Randolph (1651-1711) had founded the Turkey Island Randolph family. Peter was associated with Turkey Island, a plantation in the James River in Henrico County in what was at the time the Colony of Virginia. However, Beverley was born at the Chatsworth plantation in Henrico County. His elder brother, William Randolph married Mary Skipwith, and their younger brother Robert Randolph (1760-1825) married Elizabeth Carter, the daughter of "King" Carter. Their sister Ann Bolling Randolph married William Fitzhugh.

Randolph was educated at The College of William and Mary, like many of his ancestors and relatives, and graduated in 1771, then served on the board of visitors in 1784.

Beverley Randolph married Martha (Patty) Cocke in 1775. They had a daughter, Lucy Bolling Randolph, who married her distant cousin William Randolph (b. 1769), who was descended from Thomas Randolph of Tuckahoe plantation (1683-1729). Complicating matters, he had had the same first name (honoring great grandfather Peter Beverley) as his father's elder brother. That man, who was born in 1706 and represented Charles City County and the College of William and Mary at various times in the House of Burgesses, died at Yorktown, Virginia in 1770. That man's second wife and widow was Elizabeth Lightfoot, who then remarried to Robert Burwell. His great nephew (son of his elder brother William's son Peter Randoph, who had married James Southall) also had the same name but married Sarah Rutherford, did not serve in statewide office, and their child died very young.

== Career ==
Randolph led the Cumberland County militia during the American Revolutionary War.

Cumberland County voters elected him as their (part-time) representative to the Virginia House of Delegates and both failed to and did re-elected him twice, so he served three of the four sessions between 1777 and 1780. In 1787, he was chosen president of the Executive Council of Virginia. When George Wythe withdrew from the Philadelphia Convention of 1787, George Mason suggested that Randolph (who happened to be in Philadelphia at the time) be appointed in his place. However, the Council and governor decided that in light of the abilities of Virginia's remaining delegates, Wythe did not need to be replaced.

Randolph was elected Governor of Virginia in 1788, the first to be elected after Virginia ratified the United States Constitution. Issues which challenged his administration included the boundary and relations between Virginia and Pennsylvania, as well as depredations by native Americans. Although the normal term was three years, he was nearly challenged in 1790, when Benjamin Harrison was nominated for the office but withdrew his candidacy. Randolph later ran again for governor in 1796, but lost to James Wood.

In the 1787 Virginia tax census, Randolph lived in Henrico County and was taxed on six enslaved Black adults, eight enslaved children, six horses, a cow and a four-wheeled conveyance (which was specified as neither a coach nor chariot), as well as held five enslaved Black adults, four enslaved children under 16, six horses and 27 cattle in Cumberland County (which that county's collector noted as not tithable).

== Death and legacy ==
Randolph died on his farm near Green Creek in Cumberland County, Virginia. A century and a half later, a Beverley Randolph Jr. represented Richmond City in the House of Delegate (1938-1941).

== Ancestry ==
Ancestors of Beverley Randolph

16. Richard Randolph
8. William Randolph
17. Elizabeth Ryland
4. William Randolph II
18. Henry Isham
9. Mary Isham
19. Katherine Banks
2. Peter Randolph
20. Robert Beverley
10. Peter Beverley
5. Elizabeth Beverley
22. Robert Peyton
11. Elizabeth Peyton
1. Beverley Randolph
24. John Bolling
12. Robert Bolling
25. Mary Carrie/Clarke
6. Robert Bolling Jr.
26. John Drury Stith
13. Anne Stith
27. Jane Gregory
3. Lucy Bolling
28. Richard Cocke
14. Richard Cocke
29. Mary Aston
7. Anne Mary Cocke
15. Elizabeth ?

== See also ==
- First Families of Virginia
- Randolph family of Virginia

Political offices
Preceded by Edmund Randolph	Governor of Virginia; 1788–1791	Succeeded by Henry Lee
