= Venus (1809 ship) =

History

United Kingdom
- Name: Venus
- Namesake: Venus (mythology)
- Builder: James Macrae, Chittagong
- Launched: September 1809
- Fate: Last listed in 1833

General characteristics
- Tons burthen: 277, or 283, or 28347/94, (bm)
- Length: 98 ft 4 in (30.0 m)
- Beam: 26 ft 0 in (7.92 m)
- Complement: 1815: 56 lascars

Venus was launched at Chittagong in 1809 as a country ship. She participated as a transport in two British invasions. Then in 1815 USS Peacock captured her. By 1818 or so she was back under British ownership. She may have traded with New South Wales and the Cape of Good Hope. She was last listed in 1833.

== Career ==
Early in her career Venus participated as a transport vessel in two British invasions. In 1810 Venus supported the British Invasion of Île Bonaparte and Île de France.

The next year she was a transport for the invasion of Java (1811).

=== Capture ===
Peacock, under the command of Master Commandant Lewis Warrington, departed New York 23 January 1815 and rounded the Cape of Good Hope into the Indian Ocean. There she captured three prizes in the Straits of Sunda: Union, Venus, and Brio del Mar (or Breo de Mar, or Brio de Mais), on 13, 21, and 29 June. (Note: Union, of 290 or 310 tons (bm) had been launched in 1800 as Jennet. Breo de Mar was of 230 tons (bm). Brio de Mais, Captain Grover, was sailing from Isle de France and Batavia in ballast. She had a crew of 37 lascars.)

Venus, Captain Boone, was sailing in ballast from Isle of France to Batavia. Still she had a few articles which the Americans found of great use: shoes, stockings, handkerchiefs, razors, and combs. She also had about $5000 in silver stowed away in barrels of pork.

Warrington burnt both Union and Brio del Mar. He put Union's crew on Venus, which he made a cartel to carry both crews to Batavia. After she left on 24 June, he captured Brio del Mar and when fortuitously he again encountered Venus, he put Brio del Mar's crew on Venus too.

After Peacock captured Venus, she was sold to Arab owners.

=== British ownership again ===
Venus returned to British ownership and was registered at Calcutta in 1818 and 1822. Even so, the East-India register and directory for 1819 did not list her. She did appear in the 1824 Register with G.Dawson, master, and J.Scott & Co., owners. She had undergone rebuilding at Fort Gloster, Calcutta. She did not appear in the 1827 Register but did in the 1828 and 1829 Registers. The 1829 Register showed her master as A.Hogue and her owners still J.Scott and Co.

The following data is from Lloyd's Register (LR) and the Register of Shipping. It shows Venus trading with New South Wales and the Cape of Good Hope.

Year	Master	Owner	Trade	Source & notes
1825	A.Hague	Captain & Co.	London–NSW	LR; good repair 1824
1830	C.Cowan	Hunter	London–NSW	LR; damages and good repair 1824
1830	Cowan	Hoagel	London–Cape of Good Hope	RS

== Fate ==
Venus was last listed in 1833 with data unchanged from that in LR in 1830.
