= Federal Hill (Fredericksburg, Virginia) =

Historic house in Virginia, United States

- U.S. National Register of Historic Places
- Virginia Landmarks Register
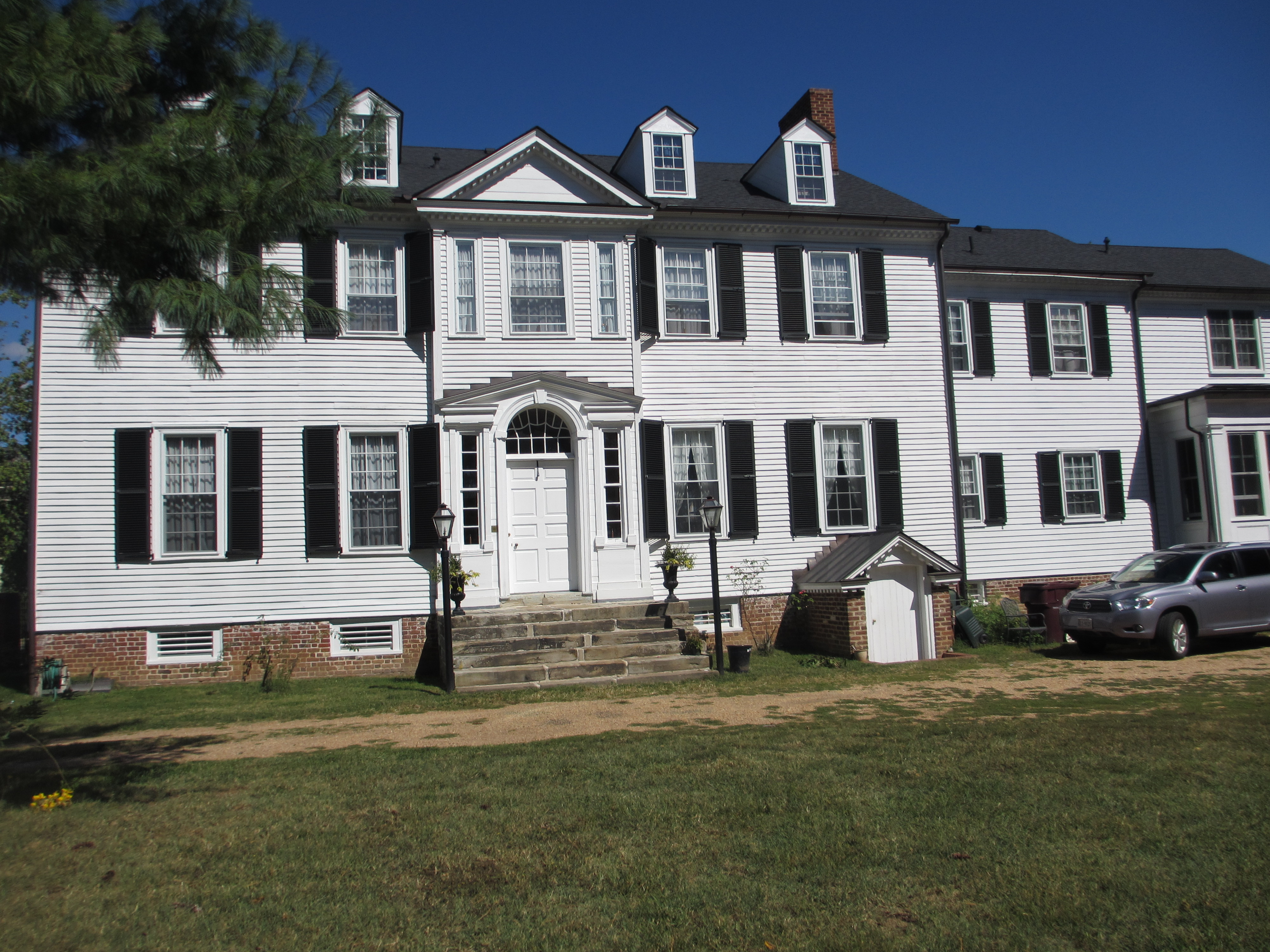
- Federal Hill, September 2012

- Location within Northern Virginia Location within Virginia Location within the United States
- Location: S side of Hanover St. between Jackson and Prince Edward Sts., Fredericksburg, Virginia
- Coordinates: 38°17′59″N 77°27′45″W
- Area: less than one acre
- Built: 1794
- NRHP reference No.: 75002110
- VLR No.: 111-0030

Significant dates
- Added to NRHP: March 26, 1975
- Designated VLR: November 19, 1974

Federal Hill is a historic home located at Fredericksburg, Virginia. It was built about 1794, and is a 2 1/2-story, brick and frame dwelling sheathed in weatherboard, with a two-story frame wing. It has a gable roof with dormers. The front facade has a central pedimented pavilion and recessed fanlight door. The large ballroom and elaborate dining room are distinctive for their mixing of late colonial and Federal detailing. Federal Hill was probably built by Robert Brooke (1761–1800), governor of Virginia from 1794 to 1796.

It was listed on the National Register of Historic Places in 1975.
