= United States Navy use of Hydrometer in the 1800s =

Historical use of the measuring equipment

Certain ships of the United States Navy adopted the use of the hydrometer in the 1850s. Readings taken of the density of seawater contributed to research into the dynamics of ocean currents.

== Adoption ==
The first International Maritime Conference held at Brussels in 1853 (a.k.a. "Brussels Conference") for devising a uniform system of meteorological observations at sea recommended the systematic use of the hydrometer. Captain John Rodgers, Lieutenant Porter, and Dr. William Samuel Waithman Ruschenberger, all of the United States Navy did this as did Dr. Raymond, in the American steamer Golden Age, and Captain Henry Toynbee, (F.R.A.S., F.R.A.G.S) of the English East Indiaman Gloriana. All of these men returned valuable observations with the hydrometer, though Captain Rodgers afforded the most extended series. Those navigators who used the hydrometer enlarged the bounds of knowledge and fields of research and led to the discovery of new relations of the sea.

The object which the Brussels Organization had in view when the specific gravity column was introduced into the sea-journal was that hydrographers might find in it data for computing the dynamical force which the sea derives from its currents from the difference in the specific gravity of its waters in different climes. The Brussels Conference agreed that a given difference as to specific gravity between the water in one part of the sea and the water in another would give rise to certain currents, and that the set and strength of these currents would be the same, whether such difference of specific gravity arose from difference of temperature or difference of saltiness, or both.

== Findings ==
The observations made with it by Captain Rodgers, on board the Vincennes – the first United States warship to circumnavigate the globe – showed that the specific gravity of sea water varies but little in the trade-wind regions, notwithstanding the change of temperature. The temperature was a little greater in the southeast trade-wind region of the Pacific; less in the Atlantic. But, though the sea at the equatorial borders of the trade-wind belt is some 20° or 25° warmer than it is on the polar edge, the specific gravity of its waters at the two places in the Atlantic differs but little. Though the temperature of the water was noted, his observations on its specific gravity have not been corrected for temperature.

== Sources ==
- Matthew Fontaine Maury, Physical Geography of the Sea, sect.433-34
- Captain "Henry" Toynbee, New South Wales marine records
