= Warrington, Buckinghamshire =

Village and civil parish

Coordinates: 52.177°N 0.689°W

Warrington
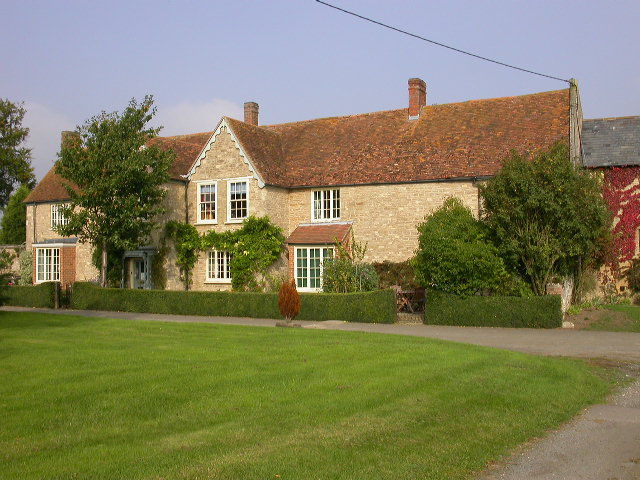
- The Old Stone Barn, Warrington

- Location within Buckinghamshire
- Interactive map of Warrington
- Population: (The ONS declines to release census data lest individuals be identifiable because the number of residents is so small).
- OS grid reference: SP896540
- Civil parish: Warrington
- District: City of Milton Keynes
- Unitary authority: Milton Keynes City Council
- Ceremonial county: Buckinghamshire
- Region: South East
- Country: England
- Sovereign state: United Kingdom
- Post town: OLNEY
- Postcode district: MK46
- Dialling code: 01234
- Police: Thames Valley
- Fire: Buckinghamshire
- Ambulance: South Central
- UK Parliament: Milton Keynes North

Warrington is a hamlet and civil parish in the unitary authority area of the City of Milton Keynes, Buckinghamshire, England, near Olney and on either side of the A509. It formed part of the parish of Olney until 1866. At the 2011 Census the population of the hamlet was included in the civil parish of Lavendon. At the 2021 census, the parish was counted separately but the ONS declined to release census data lest individuals be identifiable because the number of residents is so small.

The hamlet name is an Old English language word that means 'Wærheard's estate'. It was recorded in the Domesday Book in 1086 as Wardintone.

The hamlet is 10 miles (16 km) north-east of Central Milton Keynes and 60 miles (97 km) north-west of London. It is the most northerly civil parish in the Milton Keynes UA, of Buckinghamshire and of the South East England Region.

== See also ==
- Warrington (disambiguation) for other Warringtons around the world
