= Memorial Foundation for Children =

North American charitable organization

The Memorial Foundation for Children (Former names include Female Humane Association (1807–1921) Memorial Home for Girls (1921–1946) and the Memorial Foundation (1946–1962)) is a charitable organization in Richmond, Virginia that has been operating since 1807. It was one of Virginia's first charitable institutions. While it originally had an orphanage associated with it, it divested of this in the 1970s and now is solely a grant-making institution.

== History ==
=== Founding ===
The MFC was founded in 1807 as "Female Humane Association" by Jean Moncure Wood, the wife of the Virginia Governor James E. Wood. According to early founding stories, a young homeless girl presented herself at the door of the governor's wife, who realized the lack of shelter for homeless children in the city.

=== Original focus on female children: education and domestic service ===
Eventually the society decided to focus on housing and educating needy children. Often the education provided would be accompanied by the young girls being given employment in prominent local [white] households

=== First buildings ===
- In 1810 Major William Duval (William Pope Duval's father) offered the Association two lots to build a home and the Female Humane Association of the City of Richmond was incorporated by Act of the General Assembly of Virginia on 8 January 1811. The Association expanded and received large bequests from the Amicable Society of Richmond and the estate of Richmond Irishman Edmund Walls after Walls' death in 1841. The first building, a new orphanage building, was completed and dedicated in 1843.

=== Name changes ===
Over the years, the organization has changed its name based on adjusting its focus as well as the realities of other services available in Richmond.

- In 1921, the name changed from The Female Humane Association to become the "Memorial Home for Girls."
- In the 1920s and 30s The Memorial Home for Girls began specializing in the treatment of emotionally disturbed girls and boys in a residential unit and day-care treatment center. The home also worked closely with the Children's Memorial Clinic, an organization founded by Richmond residents and funded by the Community Fund of New York.
- in 1946 the Memorial Home for Girls was renamed the Memorial Foundation.
- In 1962 the Memorial Foundation changed its name to Memorial Foundation for Children to mark a clearer distinction between itself and the Memorial Clinic with which it had been partnering.
- Memorial Foundation for Children closed its orphanage in Richmond's Northside during the mid 1970s and devoted its mission to writing grants.
