= Rachel Warrington =

American woman and mother of Lewis Warrington

Rachel Warrington (January 20, 1753–ca. 1815) was a woman who became embroiled in a scandal, bearing a son, Lewis, probably fathered by Donatien-Marie-Joseph de Vimeur, vicomte de Rochambeau in late eighteenth century Colonial Williamsburg and Yorktown, Virginia. There is an alternate theory that Louis-François-Bertrand du Pont d'Aubevoye de Lauberdière was Lewis's father. Rachel and her sister Camilla had been taken in by their aunt and uncle, Suzannah and George Riddell; both men lived in the Riddell household during the winter of 1781–1782..

Lewis had a notable career in the US Navy, becoming a commodore and later United States Secretary of the Navy.

== Early life ==
Rachel Warrington was born on January 20, 1753 at Charles Parish in York, Virginia. She and her sister were orphaned at a young age, when their father Thomas Warrington, a minister in Hampton, Virginia, died in 1770.

Thomas Warrington was ordained by the Church of England in 1747 and came to Colonial Virginia from England the same year. He was a minister at the Charles Parish in York, Virginia. With him were his wife, Elizabeth, and son Francis Spencer Warrington, who was born January 20, 1749, and baptized at the Charles Parish on Feb. 11, 1749. He was then the minister of the St. John's Episcopal Church of Hampton from 1756 to 1770. (Note: In a history of Hampton, Virginia, Rev. Thomas Warrington was identified as Lewis Warrington's grandfather.) Thomas was recommended for the position by Governor William Gooch. The reverend was described as "a fearless, upright man" like "his brave and patriotic grandson, Commodore Louis [Lewis] Warrington."

The sisters then lived with Suzannah and Dr. George Riddell, her aunt and uncle. Suzannah Riddell was the sister of Thomas Warrington. Camilla was particularly beautiful and "with that sort of wit which delights in sharp repartee". With those qualities and the Riddell's social connections, she had the opportunity to marry into an elite family despite lacking a dowry. By 1779, Rachel was 26 years of age with no prospects for marriage. Dr. Riddell died that year and left £1,500 to Camilla and £1,000 for Rebecca. Young women of her social class generally were married by their early twenties.

The Warrington women moved with Suzannah Riddell into a house (now called the Brush-Everard House in Williamsburg on Palace Green near Governor's Palace after Dr. George Riddell's death. Suzannah was a wealthy and propertied woman. By 1782, there were four white people and 14 African Americans in the household.

They were neighbors of Governor Thomas Jefferson, George Wythe, Francis Bland Randolph Tucker and St. George Tucker. They were not taken in by the Williamsburg gentry. Betsy Ambler said that she "had little patience with either" of the young women. Rachel had "more bewitching talents for seducing a guileless heart then any human being I have ever known", according to Betsy's friend Mildred Smith. Both Betsy and Mildred were the daughters of wealthy and respected men.

== French troops at Williamsburg ==
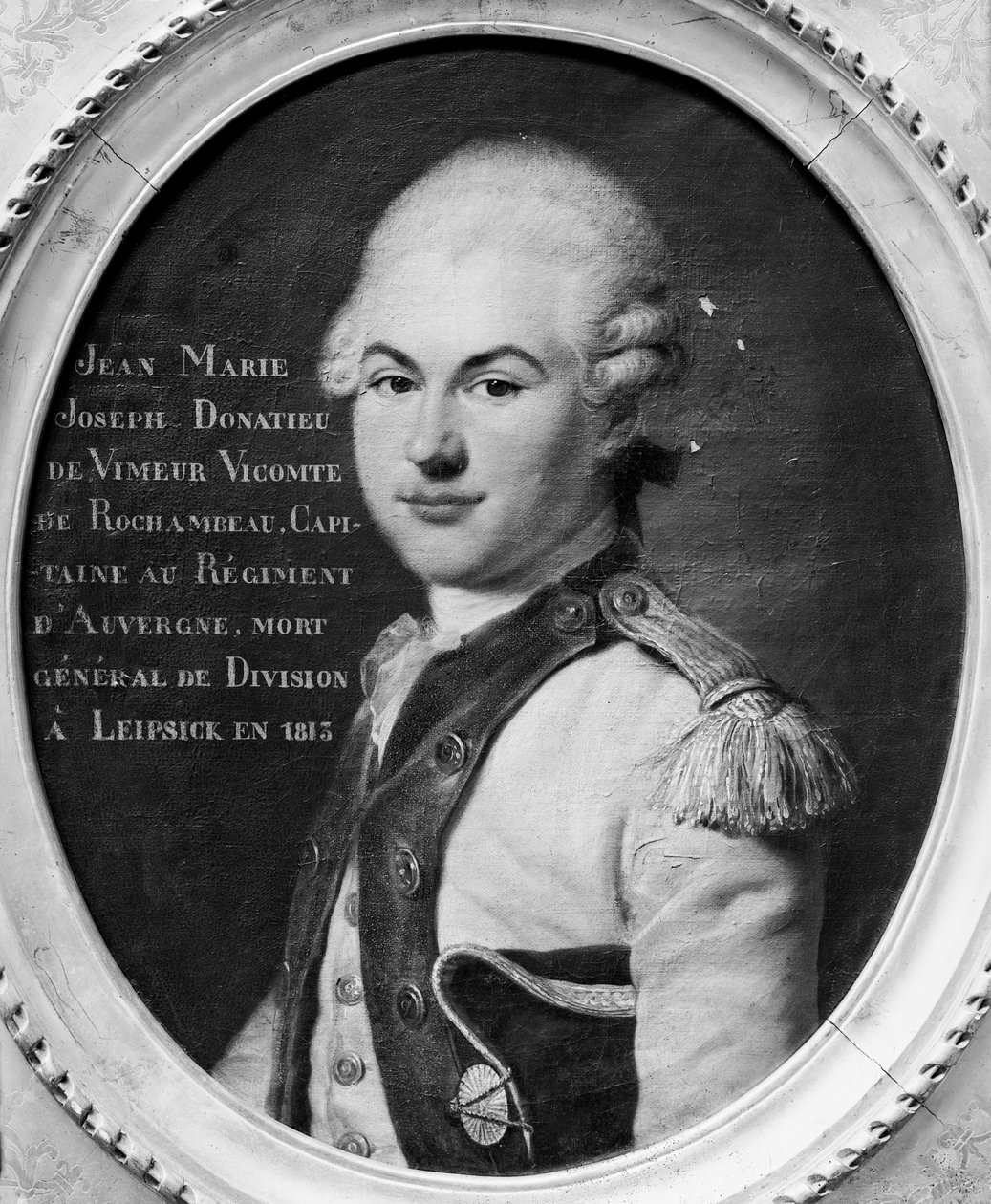
Donatien de Rochambeau in the uniform of the Auvergne Regiment

French troops, led by the commander of the French army in North America, Jean-Baptiste Donatien de Vimeur, comte de Rochambeau, arrived in America in 1781.

They participated in the Yorktown campaign, the final campaign of the American Revolutionary War. After the defeat of Cornwallis's army in October, most of the officers were quartered in Williamsburg over the winter. The commander's son Donatien-Marie-Joseph de Vimeur, vicomte de Rochambeau and his nephew Louis-François-Bertrand du Pont d'Aubevoye de Lauberdière stayed at Suzannah Riddel's house. During that time, the vicomte de Rochambeau and Rachel became lovers. She gave birth to Lewis Warrington in November 1782.

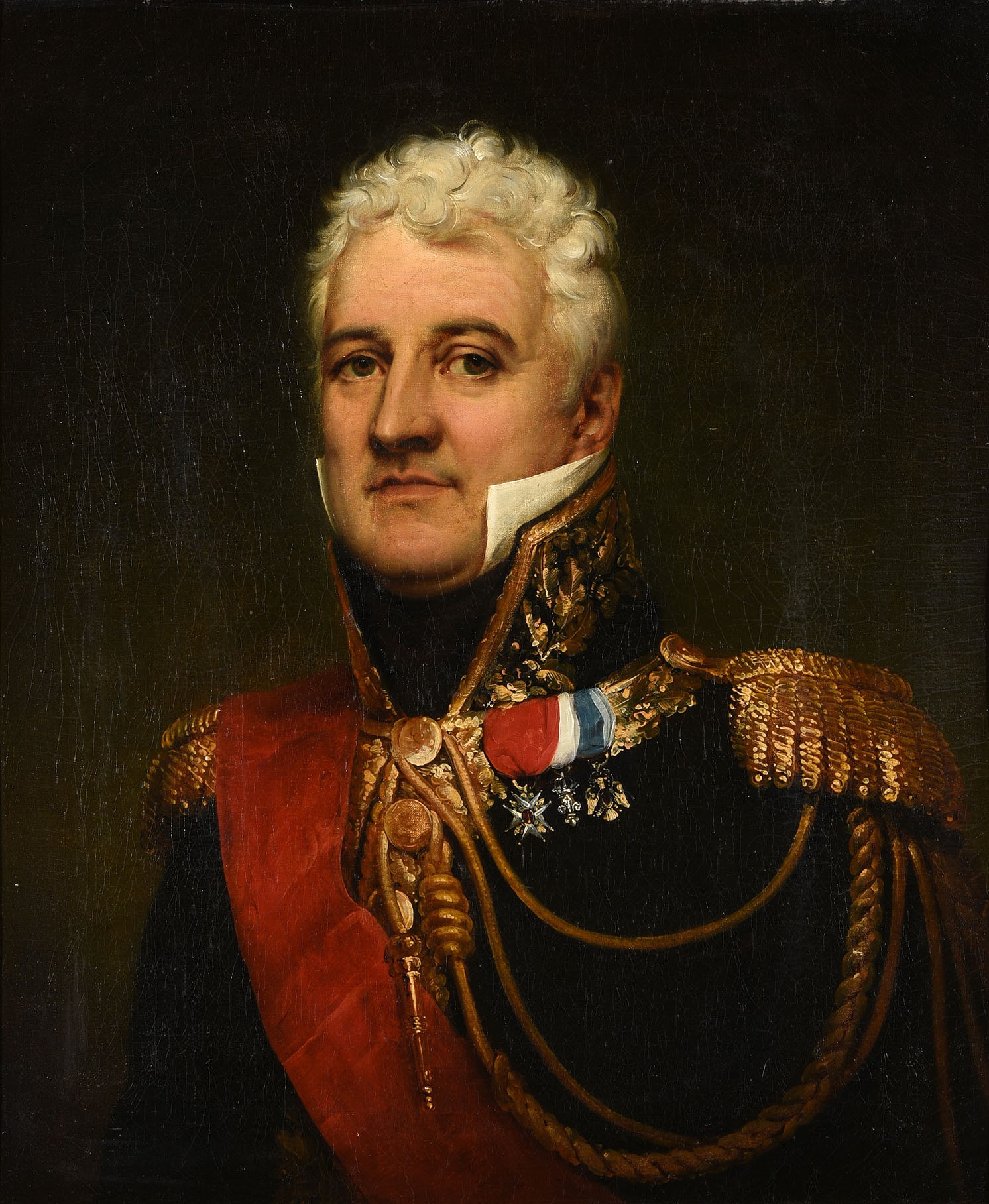
Louis-François-Bertrand du Pont d'Aubevoye de Lauberdière

There is also the possibility that the father of the baby was not the vicomte, but Lauberdière, who noted in his journal that he and Rochambeau had begun romantic relationships with Rachel and Camilla.

On January 8, 1783, the Vicomte de Rochambeau left America aboard the L’Emeraude, leaving Rachel and their baby behind. Rachel kept on hoping that he would return over the next four years. Camilla was afraid that the scandal would affect her chances of having a good marriage.

The vicomte de Rochambeau survived the French Revolution and in 1807 his father died and he became the Comte de Rochambeau. He died in 1813 at the Battle of Leipzig under Napoleon Bonaparte. Neither Rochambeau nor Lauberdière acknowledge Lewis as their son.

== Lewis Warrington ==
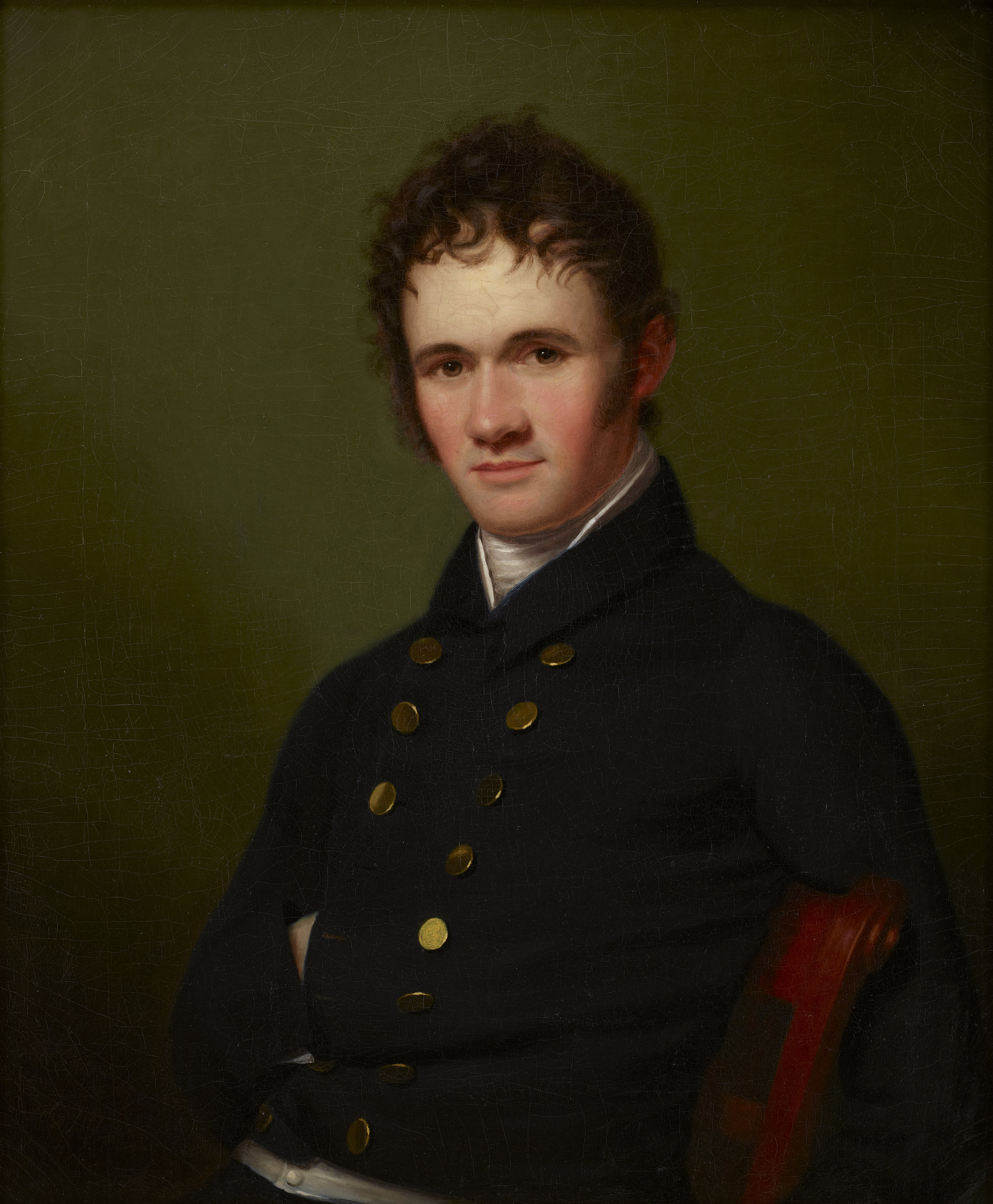
Lewis Warrington entered the U.S. Navy as a midshipman in 1800 and steadily rose in rank. For his heroism in the War of 1812, Congress awarded him a medal.

Her son enlisted in the United States Navy and became commander of the Peacock, serving in the War of 1812. He reached the position of commodore in the Navy, the highest position at the time. He was awarded a gold medal by the United States Congress, and a "presentation sword" by the Commonwealth of Virginia, the highest military awards at that time.

Lewis received an inheritance from his aunt Suzannah Riddell, which he was not to receive until his mother's death, after her death in about 1815. He shared his inheritance with his stepsisters. He continued to have a distinguished Naval career, becoming the Secretary of the Navy, and died in 1851.

== Marriages ==
Rachel remained at Suzannah Riddel's house for some time. Suzannah wrestled with her affectionate feelings for Lewis, while also feeling it was inappropriate to be too close to the illegitimate boy. She ensured that he had a good education at College of William & Mary. Lewis's guardian was Rev. Robert Andrews.

The Mother [Rachel] is treated kindly by her friends—and the Boy will, under the direction, of Your Aunts Executors, my Father & Mr A[ndrews] receive every advantage that can be given him

— Elizabeth "Betsy" Ambler to Miss Caines, niece of Mrs. Riddell, 1786

Suzannah died in 1786. Rachel married Richard Brown on November 10, 1786, in York, Virginia, and they lived in poverty in Yorktown, Virginia with Brown's daughters. Lewis remained in Williamsburg; he would not take his stepfather's surname.

Camilla married the son of an Episcopalian minister, Parson Barrett. He died after a couple of years, and she married Mr. Semple, who was later judge of the General Court.

== Death ==
Rachel Warrington died in about 1815.

== Legacy ==
Elizabeth "Betsy" Carrington corresponded about Rachel's scandal and Lewis's Naval career for 40 years. Her correspondence is held at the University of Virginia library.
