= William Ruschenberger =

United States Navy officer and naturalist

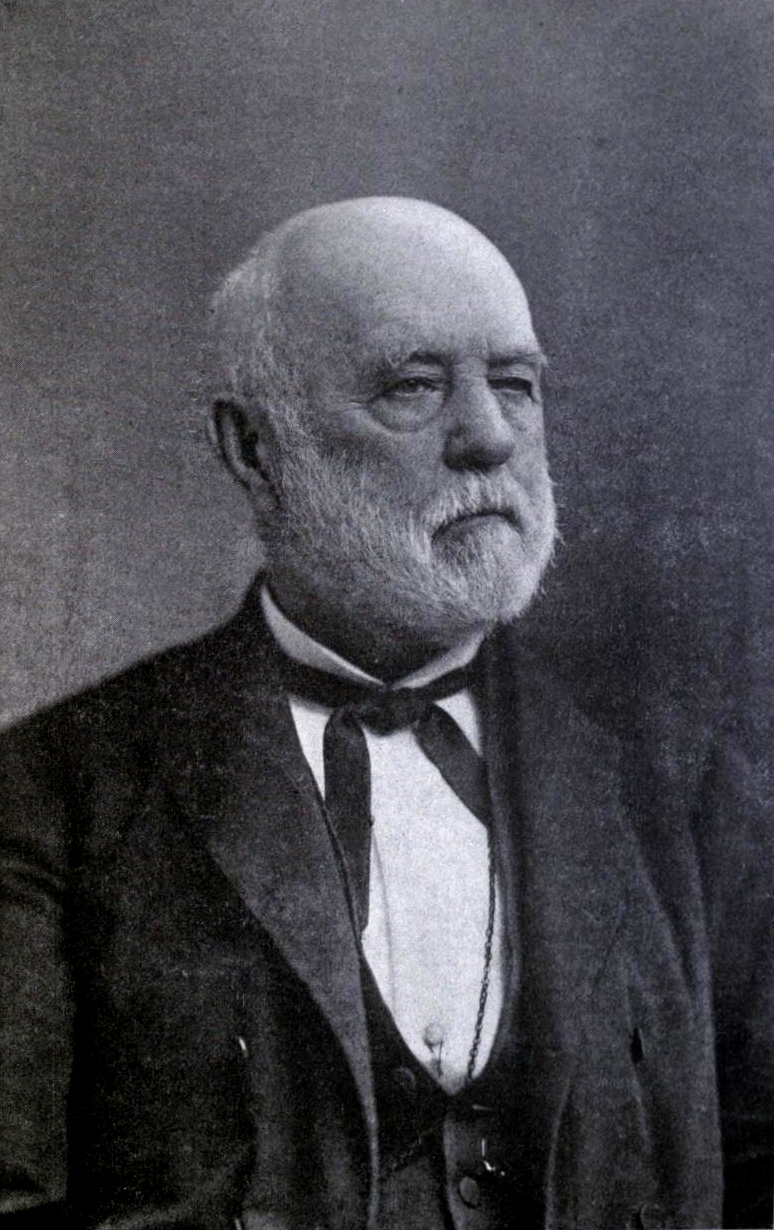
- Born: William Samuel Waithman Ruschenberger; September 4, 1807; Cumberland County, New Jersey
- Died: March 24, 1895 (aged 87); Philadelphia, Pennsylvania
- Occupations: US navy surgeon and author

William Samuel Waithman Ruschenberger (4 September 1807 in Cumberland County, New Jersey – 24 March 1895 in Philadelphia, Pennsylvania) was a surgeon for the United States Navy, a naturalist, and a writer.

== Biography ==
After attending schools in Philadelphia and New York Ruschenberger entered the United States Navy with the rank of surgeon's mate, on 10 August 1826. He graduated from the medical department of the University of Pennsylvania in 1830, and was commissioned as a naval surgeon on 4 April 1831. In 1836 he was posted aboard USS Peacock, and accompanied the second mission of diplomatist Edmund Roberts to Muscat and Siam. He was subsequently fleet surgeon of the East India Squadron between 1835 and 1837.

From 1840 to 1842 Ruschenberger was attached to the naval facility at Philadelphia, and then the Brooklyn Navy Yard hospital between 1843 and 1847. In 1849, he was elected as a member to the American Philosophical Society. He was again fleet surgeon of the East India Squadron 1847–1850, of the Pacific Squadron 1854–1857, and of the Mediterranean Squadron from August 1860 until July 1861. During the intervals between cruises he was on duty at Philadelphia. During the Civil War he was surgeon of the Boston Navy Yard. He was on special duty at Philadelphia 1865–1870, was the senior officer in the medical corps 1866–1869, and was retired on 4 September 1869. He was president of the Academy of Natural Sciences of Philadelphia 1870–1882, and president of the College of Physicians of Philadelphia 1879–1883. He was commissioned medical director on the retired list on 3 March 1871. Dr. Ruschenberger published some of the results of his investigations during his cruises, by which he had acquired a wide reputation.

He also served as a member of the Board of Appointments whose purpose was to form rules and plans for the United States Naval Academy. Dr. Ruschenberger rose to the rank of commodore before he retired. He wrote several works based on his service in the Pacific and along the coast of South America. He was a contributor to Samuel George Morton's work on the "science" of race. He dedicated A Voyage Around the World to Morton and in return Morton dedicated his Crania Americana to Ruschenberger.

== Legacy ==
A species of New World boa, Corallus ruschenbergerii, is named in his honor.

== Works ==
- Three Years in the Pacific (Philadelphia, 1834; 2 vols., London, 1835)
- A Voyage around the World including an Embassy to Muscat and Siam in 1835, 1836 and 1837 (Philadelphia, 1838)
- Elements of Herpetology, and of Ichthyology (with Henri Milne-Edwards and Achille Comté; 1844)
- Elements of Natural History (2 vols., Philadelphia, 1850)
- A Lexicon of Terms used in Natural History (1850)
- A brief history of an existing controversy on the subject of assimilated rank in the Navy of the United States (1850)
- A Notice of the Origin, Progress, and Present Condition of the Academy of Natural Sciences of Philadelphia (1852)
- Notes and Commentaries during Voyages to Brazil and China, 1848 (Richmond, 1854)

He also published numerous articles on naval rank and organization (1845–1850), and contributed papers to medical and scientific journals. He edited the American edition of Mrs. Somerville's Physical Geography, with additions and a glossary (1850; new ed., 1853).

With regard to the opening of Thailand–United States relations, the accounts of Dr. Ruschenberger and Mr. Roberts were collected, edited and re-published as Two Yankee Diplomats In 1830s Siam.

== See also ==
- United States Navy use of Hydrometer 1800s
