= USS Peacock (1813) =

Sloop-of-war of the United States Navy

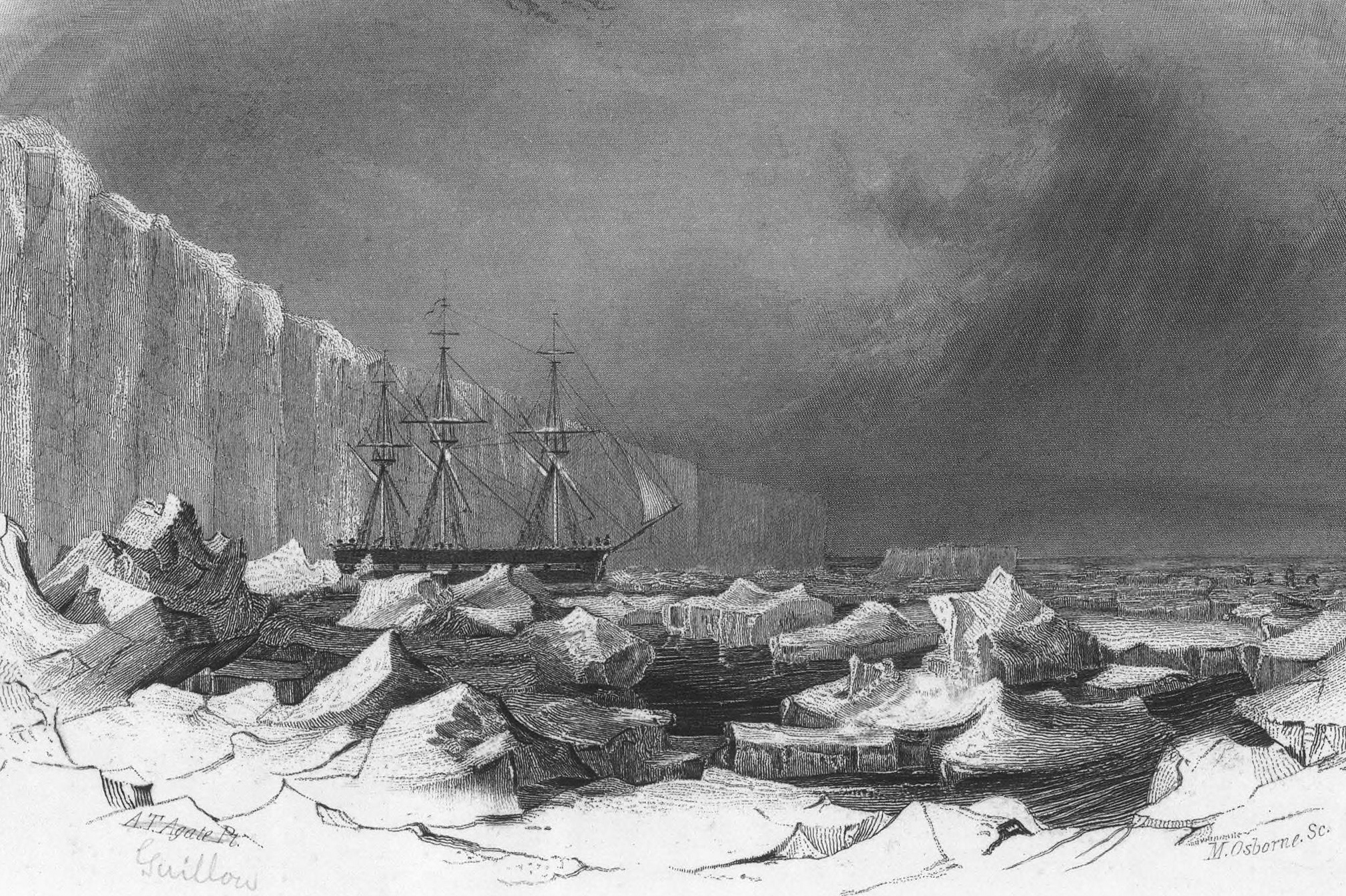
- Peacock in Antarctic ice, by Alfred Thomas Agate, while she was on the United States Exploring Expedition

History

United States
- Name: Peacock
- Namesake: Peacock
- Ordered: 3 March 1813
- Builder: Adam and Noah Brown, New York Navy Yard
- Laid down: 9 July 1813
- Launched: 19 September 1813
- Decommissioned: October 1827
- Refit: Rebuilt as exploring ship, 1828
- Recommissioned: 1829
- Fate: Wrecked, 17–19 July 1841

General characteristics
- Type: Sloop-of-war
- Tons burthen: 509 (bm)
- Length: 119 ft (36 m)
- Beam: 31 ft 6 in (9.60 m)
- Draft: 16 ft 4 in (4.98 m)
- Propulsion: Sail
- Complement: 140 officers and enlisted
- Armament: 20 × 32-pounder carronades + 2 × 12-pounder bow chasers

USS Peacock was a sloop-of-war in the United States Navy that served in the War of 1812 and later the United States Exploring Expedition. Peacock ran aground and broke apart on the Columbia Bar without loss of life in 1841.

== Construction ==
Funding for creating the Peacock was authorized by an act of Congress on 3 March 1813. Its keel was laid down at the New York Navy Yard on 9 July by Adam and Noah Brown and launched on 19 September.

== War of 1812 ==
Peacock served in the War of 1812 and captured 20 ships. She performed three cruises under the command of Master Commandant Lewis Warrington. On 12 March 1814, Peacock departed New York with supplies to the naval station at St. Mary's, Georgia. In late April the Peacock captured the 18-gun brig HMS Epervier near the Bahamas. The prize was sent to Savannah, Georgia, where the United States Navy took her into service as USS Epervier.

She began her second cruise on 4 June, departing from Savannah and proceeding to the Grand Banks and along the coasts of Ireland and Spain, capturing 14 British merchant ships. Whilst sailing between St Andrews and Greenock the barque Willam was captured and scuttled by Peacock on 14 August. On 2 September, off the coast of Africa, Peacock captured the merchantman Duck, cutting down her mast and sinking her. The crew of the Duck were left in the Canary Islands. Peacock returned via the West Indies to New York, arriving there in October 1814.

The third voyage of Peacock began on 23 January 1815, after the signing of the Treaty of Ghent. She departed New York along with the Hornet and Tom Bowline. The Peacock rounded the Cape of Good Hope and sailed into the Indian Ocean. Throughout June in the Sunda Strait of the Dutch East Indies the Peacock captured three merchantmen, Brio del Mar of Batavia, Union of Calcutta, and the Venus. The pepper and gold dust cargo on the Union (Note: Union, of 310 tons (bm), had been launched at Calcutta in 1800 as Jennet.) was seized. The goods stored in the Venus, including specie, opium, and bale goods, were thrown overboard. The crew of Peacock burnt the Brio del Mar and Union and converted the Venus into a cartel to carry her prisoners. Venus was sent to Batavia, arriving there about 11 July 1815. Because the captures occurred after the formal end of the conflict, the Phoenix and Star insurance companies of Calcutta applied to the U.S. government for compensation. In 1820, the United States Congress agreed to pay £12,000 for the Union and £3,000 for the Breo de Mar.

=== Last action of the War of 1812 ===
On 30 June 1815 the Peacock captured the British East India Company brig HCS Nautilus in the Straits of Sunda during the final naval action of the war. The vessel was under the command of Bombay Marine officer Lieutenant Charles Boyce, who informed Warrington that the war had ended. Warrington claims to have suspected a ruse, although the journals of his officers note his knowledge about the Treaty of Ghent prior to encountering the Nautilus.

When Boyce refused to surrender, Peacock opened fire on Nautilus. Three Europeans and three Indian lascars were killed, while Boyce and five lascars were wounded. American casualties amounted to between four and five men wounded. When Boyce provided documents proving that the Treaty of Ghent ending the war had been ratified, Warrington released his victims. At no point did Warrington inquire about the condition of any injured aboard the Nautilus.

The Peacock returned to New York on 30 October 1815. A court of inquiry in Boston a year later exonerated Warrington of all blame. In his account on the incident, Warrington reported that the British casualties had only been lascars.

== Post-war activities ==
On 13 June 1816 the Peacock left New York for France with the Honorable Albert Gallatin and party aboard. She pulled into Havre de Grâce on 2 July. The Peacock proceeded to join the Mediterranean Squadron, where she remained until 8 May 1821, when she departed for home. The Peacock then went into ordinary at the Washington Navy Yard on 10 July 1821.

=== Combating Caribbean piracy ===
On 3 June 1822, the Peacock became the flagship of Commodore David Porter's West India Squadron, which was tasked with rooting out piracy in the Caribbean. In an expedition alongside the U.S. Revenue Marine schooner Louisiana and Royal Navy schooner HMS Speedwell, the Peacock broke up a pirate establishment at Bahia Honda Key throughout 28–30 September. Four vessels were captured, two were burnt, while the other two were staffed with prize crews and sailed to New Orleans. Eighteen of the captured pirate crew members were sent to New Orleans for trial. The Peacock captured the schooner Pilot on 10 April 1823 and another sloop on the 16th.

=== Disease ===
Cases of "malignant fever" were reported among crew members of Peacock in September 1822, which eventually necessitated a recess from anti-piracy activities. The Peacock pulled into Norfolk, Virginia, on 28 November 1822. The frigate USS Macedonian had recently lost 74 crew members to the disease before returning to Norfolk. The symptoms per Dr. Travett included bleeding in the mouth, nose, eyes, and the gastrointestinal tract. This caused vomit containing blood, hence the Spanish name for the disease, "vómito negro", "black vomit". On 31 October 1822, Captain Stephen Cassin wrote to Secretary of the Navy, Smith Thompson, confirming the yellow fever outbreak on the Peacock.

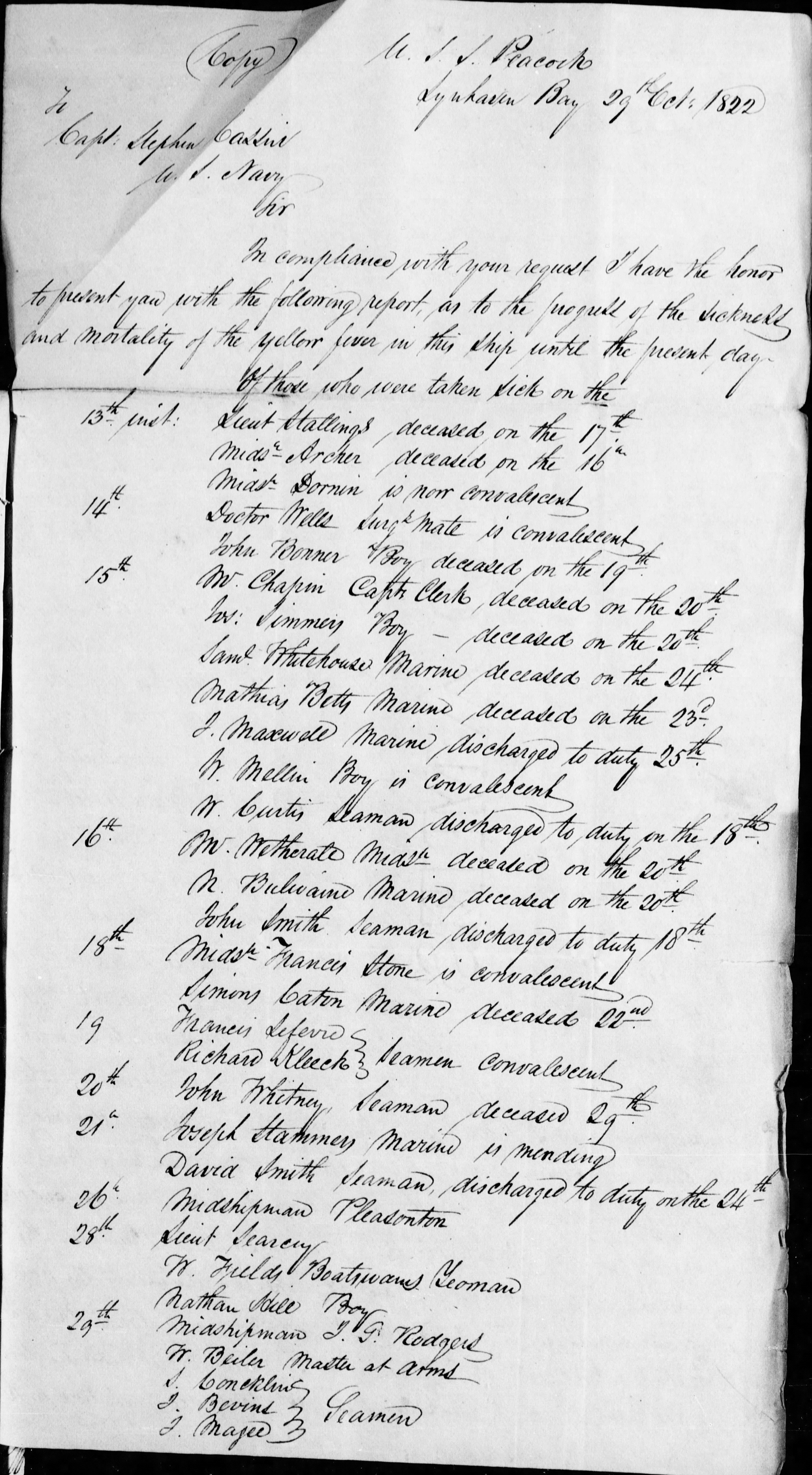
Dr. Samuel R. Travett to Stephen Cassin, 29 October 1822, regarding "malignant fever" (possibly yellow fever) outbreak, with list of sick and dead on USS Peacock, page 1.

=== Pacific Squadron ===
In March 1824 the Peacock joined the Pacific Squadron. It cruised along the west coast of South America, where colonies were struggling for independence. On 25 September 1825 Commodore Thomas ap Catesby Jones arrived at Lima to assume control of the Peacock. In early 1826 the Peacock accompanied the USS United States under the command Issac Hull across the Pacific coast of South America. The vessel hosted various dignitaries, including regional British and Dutch consuls, along with American consul William Wheelwright, and Don José Ramón Rodil after his defeat in the siege of Callao.

The Secretary of the Navy, Samuel L. Southard, had sent orders to Hull for the exploration of Pacific islands, the establishment of treaties with native rulers, and the protection of American commercial and whaling interests. Feeling events in South America necessitated his presence, Hull sent Jones and the Peacock to fulfill the directives in late May 1826. The Peacock sailed to the Marquesas Islands and later Tahiti to conclude diplomatic agreements. The Kingdom of Hawaiʻi was reached on 11 October 1826. While there, Jones negotiated a treaty of friendship, commerce, and navigation with the kingdom. Despite never being ratified by the US Congress, the Hawaiʻian government operated on the assumption the treaty was legally valid.

The Peacock left Honolulu on 6 January 1827 for San Blas, Mexico. Rumors of war erupting between the United Kingdom and the United States over the Maine-New Brunswick Border detained the Peacock at San Blas. After a month news from Joel R. Poinsett confirmed these claims were false. On 9 March the Peacock departed for Lima. A sperm whale struck the ship on 29 March and caused serious damage. Nevertheless, the Peacock reached Callao on 14 May, where it remained for six weeks for repairs. After sailing around Cape Horn, it visited Rio de Janeiro on 11 August, before reaching New York City in late October 1827.

== USS Peacock (1828) ==
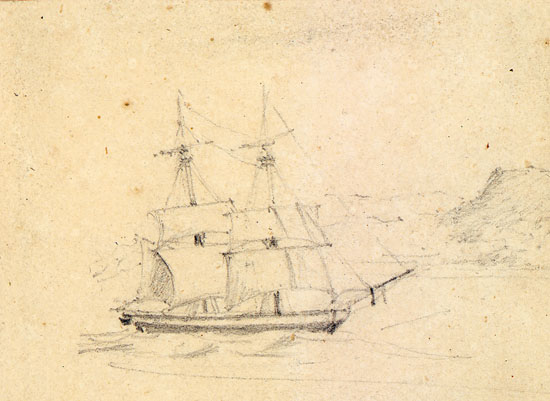
A sketch of USS Peacock during the Wilkes Expedition in 1838.

The Peacock returned to New York in October 1827 to be decommissioned, broken up, and rebuilt for a planned expedition of exploration. Her size and configuration stayed about the same, but her guns were reduced to ten: eight long 24-pounders (10.89 kg) and two long 9-pounders (4.08 kg). When plans for the exploratory voyage stalled in Congress, the Peacock re-entered regular service in the West Indies from 1829 to 1831.

Following refit, both the Peacock and the newly commissioned 10-gun schooner USS Boxer were ordered to assist the frigate Potomac, which had just sailed on the first Sumatran Expedition. The two ships were also charged with diplomatic missions. The Boxer left Boston Harbor about the middle of February 1832. It was ordered to proceed to Liberia and from there join Peacock off the coast of the Empire of Brazil; the Peacock sailed on 8 March 1832 under Commander David Geisinger.

=== Diplomatic missions ===
The Peacock conveyed Mr. Francis Baylies and his family to the United Provinces of the River Plate to assume the post of United States chargé d'affaires. This was in the aftermath of the USS Lexington raid on the Falkland Islands in 1831. On arrival, Royal Navy warships Hms Plantagenet and HMS Druid complimented her flag by playing Hail, Columbia. Also aboard was President Andrew Jackson's "special confidential agent" Edmund Roberts in the official status of Captain's clerk.

On 25 June 1832, having left orders for the Boxer to follow to Bengkulu, the Peacock departed war-stricken Montevideo. After taking water at Tristan da Cunha, the Peacock rounded the Cape of Good Hope. On either 9 or 10 August, while keeping about latitude 38° or 39°, a wave of uncommon height and volume struck the ship. It nearly threw the Peacock on her beam ends, completely overwhelmed the gig in the starboard-quarter, crushed it, and buried the first three ratlines of the mizen-shrouds under water.

On 28 August 1832 the Peacock picked up the southeast trade wind around 16°00′N 102°00′E and sailed to Bengkulu. The Dutch Resident of the city reported that Potomac had completed her mission. Under orders to gather information before going to Đại Nam, the Peacock sailed for Manila by way of Krakatoa. On the eastern side of the island hot springs boiled furiously through many fathoms of water one hundred and fifty feet from shore. Her chronometers proving useless, the Peacock threaded the Sunda Strait by dead reckoning.

Diarrhea and dysentery prevailed among the crew from Anjer to Manila; after a fortnight there, cholera struck despite the overall cleanliness of the ship. The Peacock lost seven crewmen and many who did recover died later in the voyage of other diseases. After 2 November 1833 no new cases of cholera occurred while under way for Macao. Within two leagues of either Lamma Island or the Wanshan Archipelago she took aboard a pilot. The fee for their services was thirteen dollars and a bottle of rum.

Six weeks were spent in the vicinity of Guangzhou. With the onset of the winter northeast monsoon and no sign of the Boxer, the Peacock sailed from Nei Lingding Island in the Pearl River estuary. The Peacock was ordered to explore the possibilities of expanding trade with Đại Nam. The bay of Danang was considered the best means to access the capital of Hué. Contrary winds from the northwest rather than the expected northeast quarter, coupled with a strong southward current, caused her to lose ground on every tack. On 6 January 1833, she entered the Vung-lam harbor of Phu Yen province.

Due to miscommunication the Peacock failed to secure permission to visit Hué. On 8 February the Peacock departed for the gulf of Siam. She anchored there on the 18th about 15 miles (24 km) from the mouth of the river Menam at 13°26′N 100°33′E, as was ascertained by frequent lunar observations and by four chronometers. On 20 March 1833 Roberts concluded the Siamese-American Treaty of Amity and Commerce with the minister representing King Rama III. The Peacock departed for Singapore on 5 April, where she stayed between 1 and 11 May.

While bound to Mokha the Peacock encountered the Nautilus on 29 August 1833 in the Red Sea. This was the same brig the Peacock had attacked after the end of the War of 1812. The Nautilus was sailing to Surat as escort to four brigs crowded with pilgrims returning from Mecca. Unlike their previous encounter, the Peacock did not attack the Nautilus.

Arriving off Muscat on 13 September 1833, Roberts concluded a treaty with Sultan Said bin Sultan. The Peacock departed on 7 October for Portuguese Mozambique. Roberts omitted from his records the particulars of each day, but stated that what he had written served "to show the absolute necessity of having first-rate chronometers, or the lunar observations carefully attended to; and never omitted to be taken when practicable." The Peacock returned Roberts to Rio de Janeiro on 17 January 1834, where on 1 March he boarded Lexington to return to Boston.

=== Return mission ===
Under the command of C. K. Stribling, and accompanied by U.S. Schooner Enterprise, the Peacock departed New York Harbor on 23 April 1835. Roberts was once again aboard the Peacock. The two vessels were under the command of Commodore Edmund P. Kennedy. The mission first sailed to Brazil, then round the Cape of Good Hope to Zanzibar, for Roberts to return ratifications of the two treaties.

At two in the morning on 21 September 1835 the Peacock grounded on a coral reef southeast of Masirah Island in about 2.25 fathoms (2.28 meters). This was about 400 miles (640 km) from Muscat. Roberts and six men under the command of Passed Midshipman William Rogers left in a small boat to effect a rescue. The crew heaved overboard eleven of the twenty-two guns, re-floated the ship on 23 September, and repelled Arab marauders before making sail the next day. On 28 September, Peacock was off Muscat when she encountered the sloop-of-war Sultan under the Muscat flag, and commanded by Mr. Taylor. Said bin Sultan eventually recovered the guns that had been thrown overboard and shipped them to Roberts free of charge. Peacock later obtained this letter:

I certify that during the period I have navigated the Arabian coast, and been employed in the trigonometrical survey of the same, now executing by order of the Bombay government, that I have ever found it necessary to be careful to take nocturnal as well as diurnal observations, as frequent as possible, owing to the rapidity and fickleness of the currents, which, in some parts, I have found running at the rate of three and four knots an hour, and I have known the Palinurus set between forty and fifty miles dead in shore, in a dead calm, during the night.

It is owing to such currents, that I conceive the United States ship of war Peacock run aground, as have many British ships in previous years, on and near the same spot; when at the changes of the monsoons, and sometimes at the full and change, you have such thick weather, as to prevent the necessary observations being taken with accuracy and the navigator standing on with confidence as to his position, and with no land in sight, finds himself to his sorrow, often wrong, owing to a deceitful and imperceptible current, which has set him with rapidity upon it. The position of Mazeira Island, is laid down by Owen many miles too much to the westward.

Given under my hand this 10th day of November, 1835.

S. B. Haines.

Commander of the Honorable East India Company's surveying brig Palinurus

To sailing master, John Weems, U. S. Navy.

A second attempt at negotiating with Đại Nam failed as Roberts fell desperately ill of dysentery; he withdrew to Macao where he died 12 June 1836. William Ruschenberger was commissioned on this voyage. He gave an account of the voyage until the Peacock anchored opposite of Norfolk on 27 October 1837. The Peacock had left the port more than two and a half years prior.

== US Exploration Expedition ==
In 1838 the Peacock joined the United States Exploring Expedition. She visited Callao during July 1839 and hired James D. Saules as a cook there. The Peacock then visited Tuamotus, Tahiti, and Samoa. On 16 January 1840 Henry Eld and William Reynolds of the Peacock sighted the mountains of Antarctica. The event wasn't recorded in the ship logbook. The U.S. Exploring Expedition visited the budding port of Sydney, with its diverse social milieu described by historian William R. Stanton:

"At the Jolly Sailors Inn there were separate tables for the English who drank their 'alf and 'alf out of pewter mugs and sang "Rule Britannia," the French, who took their claret in thin glasses and roared the "Marseillaise," the Russians, who with the Americans drank "something harder" and sang something incomprehensible, and of course the Americans, who treated all to an occasional round of "Yankee Doodle." It was a sailor's port."

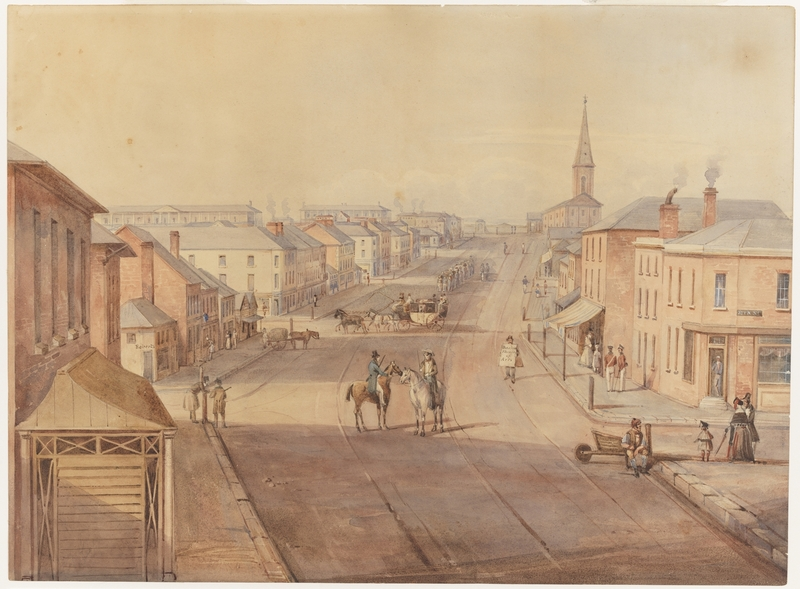
Sydney in 1843.

On 10 January 1840 the Peacock briefly visited Macquarie Island after leaving Port Jackson. After a perilous encounter with icebergs the vessel returned to Sydney on 21 February for repairs.

=== Fiji ===
On 30 March the Peacock departed the Australian port for Fiji. Once at the Fijian archipelago, in the orders of Lieutenant Charles Wilkes, the Peacock went to Rewa of Viti Levu island. Commander William L. Hudson sought to capture a man named Ro Veidovi, a brother of the reigning Roko Tui Dreketi, Ro Banuve. Ro Veidovi was accused participating in the murder of the crew of the American Charles Daggett on Ono Island in 1836.

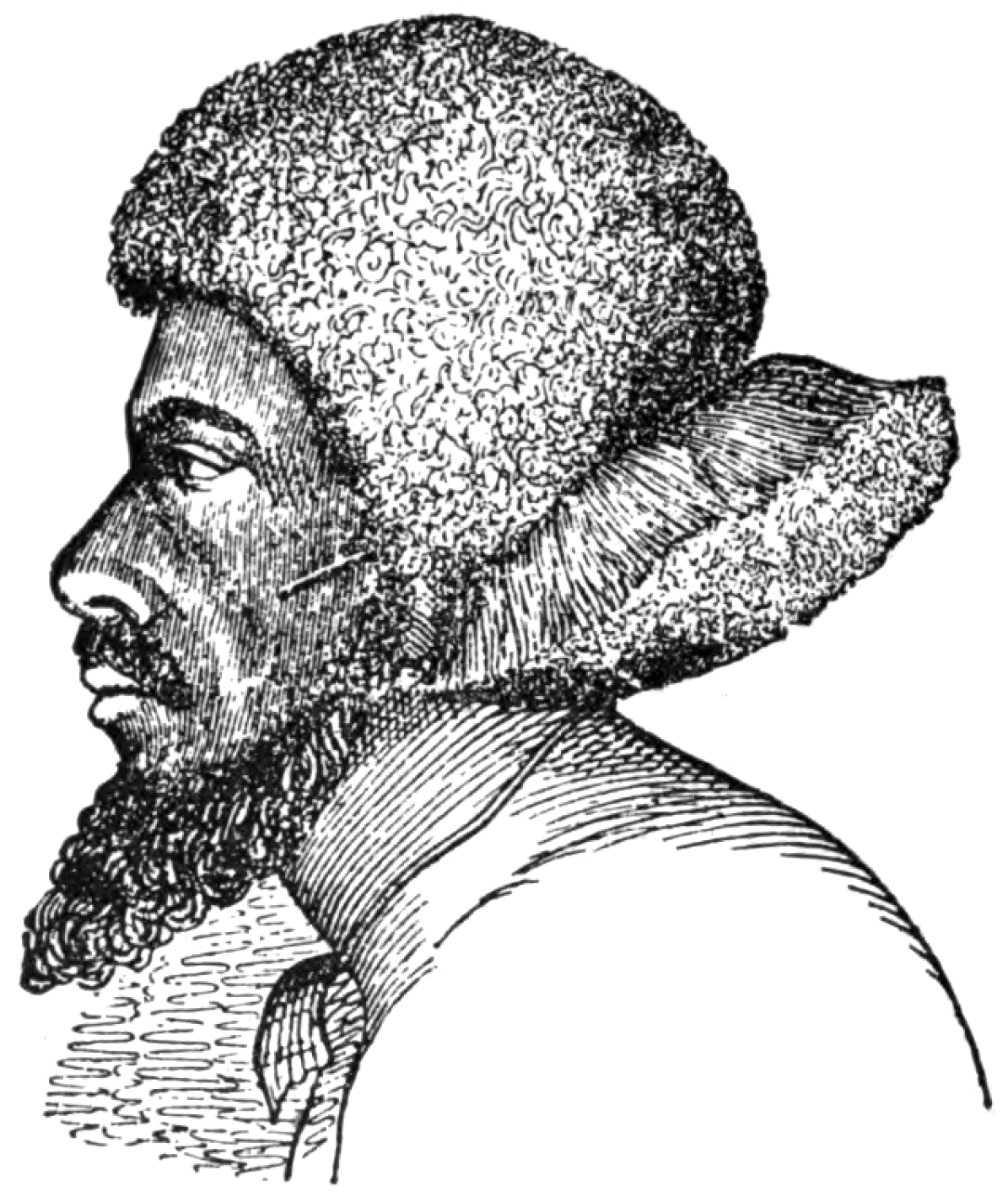
Ro Vendovi.

On 21 May, Ro Banuve along with his family and entourage, were invited onto the Peacock for entertainment. According to William Reynolds a staged ceremony was held for the visiting Fijians, with Saules a part of the ruse:

"[Ro Banuve] was honored with one roll and a half of the drum, instead of three, the black steward of my mess, who flourished the sticks, breaking down in the middle of the second, so that this part of the show terminated in several abortive squeaks of the fife breathed by the Ship’s Cook."

The Fijians were soon informed that the true purpose of their visit was to capture then as hostages. Captain Hudson explained that "meant them no harm, but it was his intention to detain them until Vendovi was brought off." Ro Veidovi surrendered himself the following day. While the American officers promised to not execute him, they insisted on taking Ro Veidovi back to East Coast of the United States. Agreeing to the proposal, Veidovi remained with the U.S. Exploring Expedition until its return to New York City in 1842, where he died from illness.

=== Hawaiʻi ===
The U.S. Exploring Expedition departed Fiji in August 1840. En route to Hawaiʻi, supplies of flour, coffee, tea, and sugar on board the Peacock ran out. Its personnel were served "worm-infested bread, a daily pound of yams per man, and stinking beef that resembled mahogany." Oahu was reached on 30 September. After resupply the Peacock returned to Samoa, as Wilkes had found the previous survey inadequate.

=== Kiribati ===
The Peacock went to contemporary Kiribati after leaving Samoa. It visited Manra of the Phoenix Islands on 17 January 1841. After several additional surveys of various atolls, on 3 April the Peacock reached Utiroa. A crewmember went missing after visiting the island. Almost the entire crew killed a number of Kiribatians in the Battle of Drummond's Island. The Peacock then sailed for Oahu, going through the Marshall Islands. The vessel reached the Hawaiian port on 14 June and received extensive repairs.

=== Wreck on Columbia Bar ===
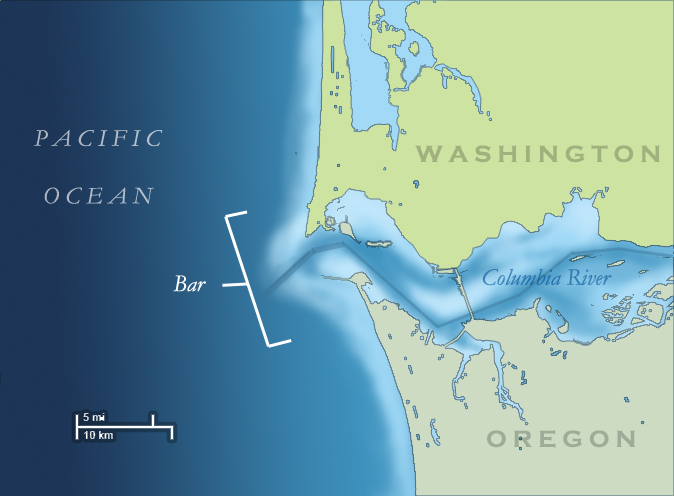
Map of the Columbia Bar.

On 2 December the Peacock departed for the Pacific Northwest. It reached the mouth of the Columbia River on 17 July 1841. In the afternoon of the following day Hudson ordered the Peacock to cross the Columbia Bar. Unfortunately, the Peacock soon hit a shoal and proceeded to be battered by the current. After struggling to keep it afloat throughout the night, the crew was rescued the following morning. The Peacock was soon destroyed thereafter. While much of the scientific data had been taken off, Titian Peale lost most of his notes.

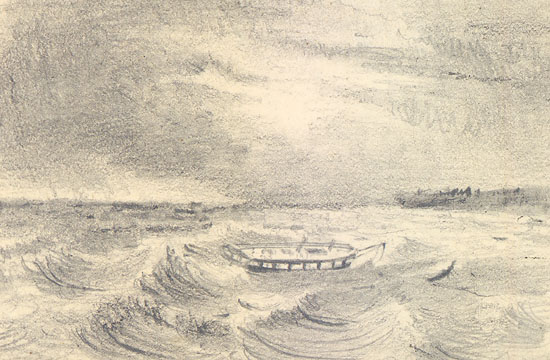
Peacock after hitting the bar of the Columbia River.

The beleaguered Peacock crew was given aid by James Birnie and John McLoughlin of the Hudson's Bay Company and Clatsop Mission members Joseph H. Frost and Henry W. Kone. The fur traders and missionaries sent food, clothing, bedding, razors, and other amenities. The crew of the Peacock established residency near the original location of Fort Astoria. While some surveying of the Columbia was commenced it only engaged a minority of the crew. Hudson ordered the kanakas of the crew to assist in the harvest of farmland maintained at Fort Vancouver. Eventually the USS Oregon was secured as a replacement vessel for the Peacock.

== See also ==
- List of historical schooners
- List of sloops of war of the United States Navy
- Bibliography of early American naval history

== Bibliography ==
=== Articles ===
- Bordwell, Constance (1991). "Delay and Wreck of the Peacock: An Episode in the Wilkes Expedition". Oregon Historical Quarterly. 92 (2). Portland, OR: Oregon Historical Society: 119–198. ISSN 0030-4727. JSTOR 20614379.
- Stauffer, Robert H. (1983). "Hawai'i-United States Treaty of 1826". Hawaiian Journal of History. 17: 40–63. hdl:10524/345.

=== Books ===
- Bunker, Robert J. (2004). "Peacock versus Epervier". In Heidler, David S.; Heidler, Jeanne T. (eds.). Encyclopedia of the War of 1812. Annapolis, MD: Naval Institute Press. pp. 406–407. ISBN 978-1-59114-362-8 – via Internet Archive.
- Bunker, Robert J. (2004b). "Peacock versus Nautilus". In Heidler, David S.; Heidler, Jeanne T. (eds.). Encyclopedia of the War of 1812. Annapolis, MD: Naval Institute Press. p. 407. ISBN 978-1-59114-362-8 – via Internet Archive.
- Coleman, Kenneth R. (2017). Dangerous Subjects. Corvallis, OR: Oregon State University Press. ISBN 9780870719042.
- Coupland, Reginald (1938). East Africa and its invaders: from the earliest times to the death of Seyyid Said in 1856. Oxford: Clarendon Press. OCLC 600549791.
- Drake, Frederick C. (2004). "Brown, Noah". In Heidler, David S.; Heidler, Jeanne T. (eds.). Encyclopedia of the War of 1812. Annapolis, MD: Naval Institute Press. pp. 67–68. ISBN 978-1-59114-362-8 – via Internet Archive.
- Drake, Frederick C. (2004b). "Warrington, Lewis". In Heidler, David S.; Heidler, Jeanne T. (eds.). Encyclopedia of the War of 1812. Annapolis, MD: Naval Institute Press. pp. 543–544. ISBN 978-1-59114-362-8 – via Internet Archive.
- Farr, Grahame E., ed. (1950). Records of Bristol Ships, 1800–1838. Vol. 15. Bristol: Bristol Record Society.
- James, William (1837). The Naval History of Great Britain, from the Declaration of War by France in 1793, to the Accession of George IV. Vol. 6. London: Richard Bentley – via Google Books.
- King, Irving H. (1989). The Coast Guard Under Sail: The U.S. Revenue Cutter Service, 1789–1865. Annapolis, MD: Naval Institute Press. ISBN 978-0-87021-234-5.
- Long, David Foster (1988). "China, 1819–1860". Gold braid and foreign relations : diplomatic activities of U.S. naval officers, 1798–1883. Annapolis: Naval Institute Press. ISBN 9780870212284. LCCN 87034879.
- Lundeberg, Philip K. (1985). "Appendix 1: Characteristics of Selected Exploring Vessels". In Viola, Herman J.; Margolis, Carolyn (eds.). Magnificent Voyagers: The U.S. Exploring Expedition, 1838–1842. Smithsonian Institution.
- Malcomson, Robert (2006). Historical Dictionary of the War of 1812. Scarecrow Press. ISBN 978-0810854994.
- Neeser, Robert Wilden (1909). Statistical and chronological history of the United States navy, 1775–1907. Vol. 2. New York: Macmillan Publishers – via Google Books.
- Phipps, John (1840). A Collection of Papers Relative to Ship Building in India. Calcutta: Scott and Co. – via Google Books.
- Reynolds, William (26 October 2004). Philbrick, Nathaniel; Philbrick, Thomas (eds.). The Private Journal of William Reynolds: United States Exploring Expedition, 1838-1842. Penguin Publishing Group. ISBN 978-0-14-303905-1.
- Roberts, Edmund (2013) [1837]. Embassy to the Eastern courts of Cochin-China, Siam, and Muscat. New York: Harper & Brothers. ISBN 978-0-608-40406-6.
- Ruschenberger, William S. W. (1837). A Voyage Round the World: Including an Embassy to Muscat and Siam in 1835, 1836 and 1837. Harper & Brothers. OCLC 12492287.
- Silverstone, Paul H. (2001). The Sailing Navy, 1775–1854. Annapolis, MD: Naval Institute Press. ISBN 1-55750-893-3.
- Smith, Gene A. (2000). Thomas ap Catesby Jones, Commodore of Manifest Destiny. Annapolis, MD: Naval Institute Press. ISBN 1-55750-848-8.
- Stanton, William R. (1975). The Great United States Exploring Expedition of 1838-1842. Berkeley and Los Angeles, CA: University of California Press. ISBN 978-0-520-02557-8 – via Internet Archive.
- USCG (1989). "Record of Movements, Vessels of the United States Coast Guard, 1790–December 31, 1933" (PDF). Historic Documents. Washington, D.C.: U.S. Coast Guard Historian's Office – via HathiTrust.
- Wilkes, Charles (1844). Narrative of the United States Exploring Expedition: During the Years 1838, 1839, 1840, 1841, 1842. Vol. 4. Philadelphia: C. Sherman.
- Wilkes, Charles (1849). Narrative of the United States Exploring Expedition: During the Years 1838, 1839, 1840, 1841, 1842. Vol. 3. Philadelphia: C. Sherman.

=== Newspapers ===
- Asiatic Journal (1820). "Post-bellum Capture". The Asiatic Journal and Monthly Register for British India and Its Dependencies. London. p. 91. hdl:2027/mdp.39015059695133 – via HathiTrust.
- Byrne, Nicholas, ed. (20 October 1814). "Ship News". The Morning Post. No. 13650. London.
- Byrne, Nicholas, ed. (28 October 1814). "Multiple News Items". The Morning Post. No. 13638. London.
- Byrne, Nicholas, ed. (12 April 1833). "China". The Morning Post. No. 19, 452. British Newspaper Archive. p. 3.
- Lloyd's List (5 December 1815). "The Marine List". Lloyd's List. No. 5028. p. 1. hdl:2027/hvd.32044105232904.

=== Theses ===
- Gilbert, Wesley John (April 2011). Our Man in Zanzibar: Richard Waters, American Consul (1837–1845) (free) (B.A. Thesis). Departmental Honors in History. Middletown, Connecticut: Wesleyan University.

=== Websites ===
- Ancestry.com (24 March 2024). "Druid, 1825". Ancestry.com. Archived from the original on 28 July 2017.
- Sharp, John G. M. (2019). "Yellow Fever aboard the USS Macedonian & USS Peacock in 1822". USGenWeb Project. Archived from the original on 25 October 2019.
- Hoai, Tran (21 September 2011). "Dossier of Xuan Dai Bay (Phu Yen Province) submitted to UNESCO". Vietnam Tours. Archived from the original on 25 October 2011.
- Jones, Thomas ap Catesby; Kaʻahumanu, Elizabeth; Karaimoku; Boki; Howapili; Namahana, Lydia (23 December 1826). "Hawaii-United States Treaty – 1826". Hawaii-nation.org. "Entered into force December 23, 1826"
- Mataitini, Ro Alipate Doviverata (9 December 2009). "Ro Veidovi-Putting Him in Proper Perspective". Fiji Sun. Archived from the original on 26 January 2020.
- Richardson, Alan (December 1979). "Voyage via the Orient: Letters to Home by Charles Richardson". Katharine's Web. Archived from the original on 28 March 2013.
- Ruschenberger, William S. W. (1873). "A report on the origin and therapeutic properties of cundurango". Cabinet of Art and Medicine. Washington: G.P.O. Archived from the original on 27 April 2012.
