= 1794 Virginia gubernatorial election =

- November 20, 1794
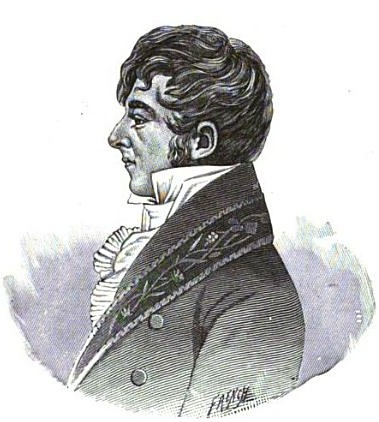

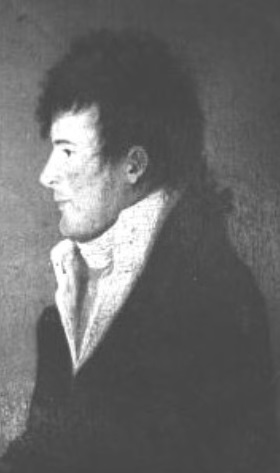
| Nominee | Robert Brooke | James Wood |
| Party | Democratic-Republican | Federalist |
| 1st ballot | 90 | 60 |
Governor before election
Henry Lee III
Federalist
Elected Governor
Robert Brooke
Democratic-Republican

A gubernatorial election was held in Virginia on November 20, 1794. The Democratic-Republican member of the Virginia House of Delegates from Spotsylvania County Robert Brooke defeated the Federalist member of the Council of State James Wood.

The Federalist incumbent governor of Virginia Henry Lee III was ineligible for re-election due to term limits established by the Constitution of Virginia. Lee courted controversy near the end of his term when he accepted command of United States troops during the Whiskey Rebellion, an action unpopular with Democratic-Republicans and farmers in Western Virginia. On November 21, the House of Delegates found Lee had forfeited his office by accepting a lucrative U.S. commission and declared the governorship vacant, nine days before Lee was due to leave office on December 1.

The election was conducted by the Virginia General Assembly in joint session. Brooke defeated Wood on the first ballot.

== General election ==
1794 Virginia gubernatorial election
| Party | Candidate | First ballot | |
| Party | Candidate | Count | Percent |
|---|---|---|---|
| Democratic-Republican | Robert Brooke | 90 | 60.00 |
| Federalist | James Wood | 60 | 40.00 |
| Total | | 150 | 100.00 |

== Bibliography ==
- Abernethy, Thomas P. (1961). The South in the New Nation: 1789–1819. n.p.: Louisiana State University Press.
- Lampi, Philip J. (2012). "Virginia 1794 Governor". A New Nation Votes. American Antiquarian Society.
- Sobel, Robert; Raimo, John (1978). Biographical Directory of the Governors of the United States 1789–1978. Vol. 4. Westport, CT: Meckler Books.
- Swem, Earl G.; Williams, John W. (1918). A Register of the General Assembly of Virginia, 1776–1918. Richmond: Superintendent of Public Printing.
