= Lewis Warrington (United States Navy officer) =

United States Navy officer (1782–1851)

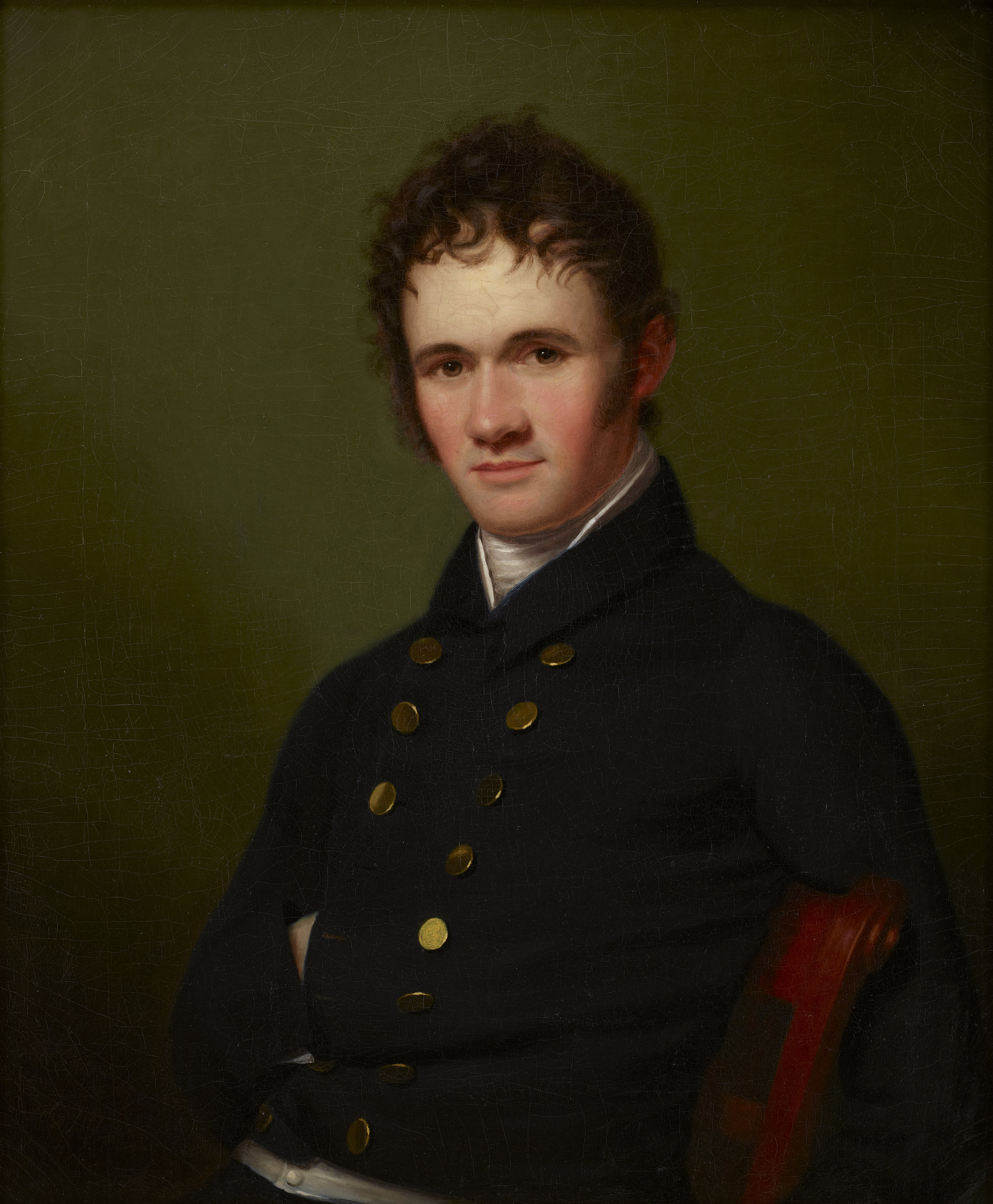
An 1801 portrait of Warrington by Rembrandt Peale

Commodore Lewis Warrington (3 November 1782 – 12 October 1851) was a United States Navy officer who saw action during the First Barbary War and the War of 1812 and temporarily served as the secretary of the Navy.

== Life and career ==
Born at Williamsburg, Virginia on 3 November 1782, Warrington was the illegitimate son of Rachel Warrington and Donatien de Rochambeau, who was stationed in Williamsburg during the winter of 1781–1782, following the battle of Yorktown. The matter of his parentage has long been confused by historians and writers, as other French officers, such Louis-François-Bertrand du Pont d'Aubevoye de Lauberdière, recorded flirtations with a number of Williamsburg's women, including Rachel Warrington and her sister Cecilia, at the same time. However, more recent research has discovered extended unsuccessful attempts by members of his mother's family to persuade Rochambeau to openly acknowledge his child, along with indications that Rochambeau offered to legitimize his son after Warrington had achieved success and notoriety.

He briefly attended the College of William & Mary before accepting an appointment as a midshipman in the Navy on 6 January 1800. His first duty, aboard the frigate Chesapeake, took him to the West Indies, where his ship cruised with a squadron during the last year of the Quasi-War with France. His ship appears to have engaged in one action near the end of the cruise. On New Year's Day 1801, she took the French privateer La Jeune Creole.

Following the cessation of hostilities with France, Midshipman Warrington remained in the Navy. His ship spent most of 1801 in ordinary at Norfolk, Virginia. The following year, Warrington was transferred to the frigate President for service in the Mediterranean against the Barbary pirates. Over the next five years, he remained with the Mediterranean Squadron, serving successively aboard the President, Vixen, and Enterprise. Promoted to lieutenant in February 1807, he returned home to assume command of a gunboat at Norfolk. In 1809, Lt. Warrington voyaged to Europe aboard the Syren as a dispatch courier. He next served a tour of duty in Essex.

When the War of 1812 with the British Empire began in June 1812, Warrington was aboard the frigate USS Congress serving as the ship's first lieutenant while she patrolled the North Atlantic. During his tour of duty aboard Congress, she made two cruises, capturing nine British prizes off the east coast of the United States during the first and four off the Atlantic seaboard of South America during the second.

Promoted to Master Commandant in July 1813, he took command of the sloop-of-war USS Peacock later in the year. On 12 March 1814, he put to sea with his new command bound for the naval station at St. Mary's, Georgia. After delivering supplies to that installation, he encountered the 18-gun brig-sloop HMS Epervier off Cape Canaveral, Florida. Peacock emerged victorious from a brisk 45-minute exchange with Epervier, killing 8 and wounding 15 of her crew and capturing the ship. For his role in the victory, Warrington received the Thanks of Congress in the form of a Congressional Gold Medal, and of the state of Virginia in the form of a gold-hilted sword. He was also elected an honorary member of the New York Society of the Cincinnati.

Warrington took his prize into Savannah, Georgia, and then embarked upon his second cruise on 4 June. On that voyage, which took him to the Grand Banks, the Irish coast, the Shetland Islands, and the Faroe Islands, he took fourteen British prizes.

After returning via the West Indies to New York, Warrington took Peacock on her third and final war cruise. His sloop-of-war stood out of New York with the Hornet and Tom Bowline on 23 January 1815, sailed around the Cape of Good Hope, and entered the Indian Ocean. Unaware that peace had been concluded in December 1814 at Ghent, Belgium, Warrington led his ships on another foray against British commerce. After taking three British prizes in the Indian Ocean, he entered the East Indies in search of more targets. On 30 June, he encountered the East India Company brig Nautilus in the Sunda Strait and attacked her, despite having been told that peace had been concluded. After firing a broadside which cost Nautilus 7 men including her first lieutenant, she surrendered to Warrington. Warrington then released the prize and started for home. Peacock arrived back in New York on 30 October 1815, where Warrington falsely claimed that the only British casualties during the attack on Nautilus had been Indian lascars.

In 1816, he commanded Macedonian briefly for a voyage to Cartagena, Spain, to convey there Christopher Hughes, the representative of the United States at negotiations over the release of some Americans imprisoned by Spanish authorities. In 1819 and 1820, Captain Warrington commanded Java, followed by Guerriere in 1820 and 1821. Each ship was assigned to the Mediterranean Squadron during his tenure as her commanding officer. Captain Warrington returned home and received orders to duty at the Norfolk Navy Yard. In February 1825, he relieved David Porter as commander of the West Indian Squadron during the latter stages of the piracy suppression campaign and thereafter bore the title, commodore.

In 1826, Warrington served as one of three commissioners on a panel charged with selecting a site on which to establish a new South Atlantic fleet. The panel selected Pensacola, Florida - site of the first permanent European settlement in North America in the year 1559 - and Warrington was ordered to Pensacola where he was charged with overseeing the construction of a new navy yard. Warrington established a village adjacent to the new navy yard and gave it his name. Warrington Village remained occupied until the 1930s when the property was transitioned for use in naval aviation and the residents were relocated. Many residents moved just outside the navy base, and established a New Warrington. Today, the diverse community is known simply as Warrington. In 1829, Lewis Warrington was promoted and returned to Norfolk for a decade as commandant of the Norfolk Navy Yard. In 1840, he was reassigned to Washington for another two years as commissioner on the Navy Board. After the 1842 reorganization of the Navy Department, Warrington became Chief of the Bureau of Yards and Docks.

On 28 February 1844, he took over temporarily the duties of the Secretary of the Navy after Secretary Thomas W. Gilmer died as a result of wounds received when the large cannon "Peacemaker" exploded during a firing demonstration on board Princeton at Washington. Near the end of March, Warrington relinquished those duties to the new secretary, John Y. Mason, and resumed his former assignment. In 1846, he became Chief of the Bureau of Ordnance, which office he held until his death on 12 October 1851. He was buried at Congressional Cemetery at a service attended by President Millard Fillmore, members of the Cabinet, and a crowd of other dignitaries.

== Text of Congressional Gold Medal ==
Friday, 21 October 1814

Resolution, expressive of the sense of Congress relative to the victory of the Peacock over the Epervier.

Resolved by the Senate and House of Representatives of the United States of America, in Congress assembled, That the President of the United States be requested to present to Captain Lewis Warrington, of the sloop of war Peacock, a gold medal, with suitable emblems and devices, and a silver medal, with like emblems and devices, to each of the commissioned officers, and a sword to each of the midshipmen, and to the sailing master of the said vessel, in testimony of the high sense entertained by Congress of the gallantry and good conduct of the officers and crew, in the action with the British brig Epervier, on the twenty-ninth day of April, in the year one thousand eight hundred and fourteen, in which action the decisive effect and great superiority of the American gunnery were so signally displayed.

== Legacy ==
Three ships in the United States Navy have been named USS Warrington for him.
