= Duck (1813 ship) =

United Kingdom
- Name: Duck
- Builder: Stettin
- Acquired: circa 1813
- Captured: 2 September 1814

General characteristics
- Tons burthen: 174 (bm)
- Complement: 12
- Armament: 2 guns

Duck first appeared in Lloyd's Register in the supplement to the volume for 1813. She had been launched at Stettin and had undergone a thorough repair in 1812.

| Year | Master | Owner | Trade | Source |
|---|---|---|---|---|
| 1813 | Stephenson | G.Faith | London | LR; thorough repair 1812 |
| 1815 | Stephenson | G.Faith | London–Gibraltar | LR; thorough repair 1812 |

The USS Peacock captured Duck off the coast of Africa. Peacock left the crew at Teneriffe, or Fuerteventura. Captain Stevenson reported that the capture had occurred on 2 September 1814 about four miles off land. Duck had been sailing from Port Cabras to Oratava and was carrying 100 tons of barilla. Peacock cut down Duck's mast and then sank her. On her cruise. Peacock captured 14 British merchantmen, most of which she sank or burnt. American records report that Duck was armed with two guns, and valued her at $21,000. She had 13 men on board, including the British consul resident at Porto Cabras.

The entry for Duck in the 1815 volume of LR carried the annotation "captured".
