= Jean Moncure Wood =

11th First Lady of Virginia

First Lady of Virginia
- In role December 1, 1796 – December 1, 1799
- Governor: James Wood
- Preceded by: Mary Ritchie Hopper Brooke
- Succeeded by: Elizabeth Monroe

Personal details
- Born: Jean Moncure; May 22, 1753 Virginia Colony, British America
- Died: March 4, 1823 (aged 69) Virginia, U.S.
- Spouse: James Wood (m. 1775)
- Children: 1

Jean Wood (née Moncure; May 22, 1753 – March 4, 1823) was the first lady of Virginia from 1796 to 1799 as the wife of James Wood, the 11th governor of Virginia. She was also a notable early woman poet in Virginia and influential in charitable circles.

== Early life and family ==
Wood was born on May 22, 1753, the third daughter of Reverend John Moncure and Frances Brown, Scottish immigrants. She grew up in Stafford County, Virginia. In 1775, she married James Wood, and they had one daughter who died in childhood.

== Governor's wife ==
During the late 1770s, Wood suffered a bout of severe illness from which she recovered.

Wood served as one of the early first ladies of Virginia upon her husband's election as Virginia's governor. As the governor's wife, she was a prominent figure in Virginia society and charitable circles. The Executive Mansion was not yet built during this period, so during her husband's term as governor they lived at Chelsea Hill and also resided at their Glen Burnie estate.

In 1807, she established the Female Humane Association to aid women and children in need, of which she served as president. The organization is considered as one of the first examples of a women's charity in Virginia, and was chartered by the Virginia General Assembly in 1811.

== Poet ==
Wood was a noted poet and writer, and several of her works were posthumously published in an 1859 volume entitled Flowers and Weeds of the Old Dominion. After her death, her unpublished volume of poems in manuscript was favorably reviewed by the Southern Literary Messenger.

== Death ==
Wood died on March 4, 1823, aged 69. She is interred in the Shields-Robinson Cemetery in Richmond, Virginia. Upon her death, the Richmond Enquirer wrote that "none had greater compassion for the afflicted".

=== Legacy ===
After her death, a charitable relief association at Hampden–Sydney College was named as the "Jean Wood Society" in her honor. The charitable organization Wood established is still in operation today and is now known as the Memorial Foundation for Children. Wood is referenced on multiple occasions in the Papers of George Washington.
