= USS Warrington =

USS Warrington may refer to the following ships of the United States Navy:

- USS Warrington (DD-30) was a modified Paulding-class destroyer launched in 1910, served in World War I and decommissioned in 1920.
- USS Warrington (DD-383) was a Somers-class destroyer launched in 1937 and sunk in 1944 during the Great Atlantic Hurricane.
- USS Warrington (DD-843) was a Gearing-class destroyer launched in 1945 and sold to Taiwan in 1973.
