= Robert Brooke (Virginia politician) =

American politician (1761–1800)

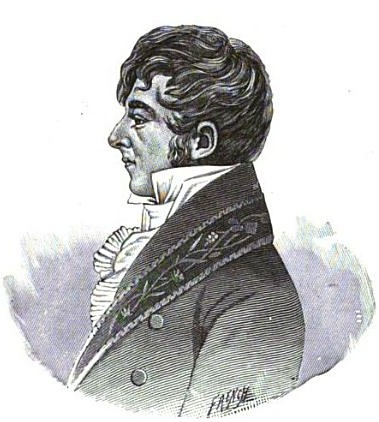

10th Governor of Virginia
- In office December 1, 1794 – December 1, 1796
- Preceded by: Henry Lee III
- Succeeded by: James Wood

Attorney General of Virginia
- In office 1796 – February 27, 1800
- Preceded by: John Whitaker Willis
- Succeeded by: Philip Norborne Nicholas

Member of the Virginia House of Delegates for Spotsylvania County
- In office October 17, 1791 – November 30, 1794 Serving with Francis Thornton, John T. Brooke, John W. Willis
- Preceded by: John Marshall
- Succeeded by: Mann Page

Personal details
- Born: c. 1751 Spotsylvania County, Colony of Virginia, British America
- Died: February 27, 1800 (aged about 49) Fredericksburg, Virginia, U.S.
- Party: Democratic-Republican
- Spouse: Mary Ritchie Hopper
- Children: Richard Brooke
- Education: University of Edinburgh

Robert Brooke (c. 1751 – February 27, 1800) was a Virginia planter, soldier, lawyer, and politician who served as the tenth governor of Virginia as well as in the Virginia House of Delegates, and as Attorney General of Virginia at the time of his death.

== Early and family life ==
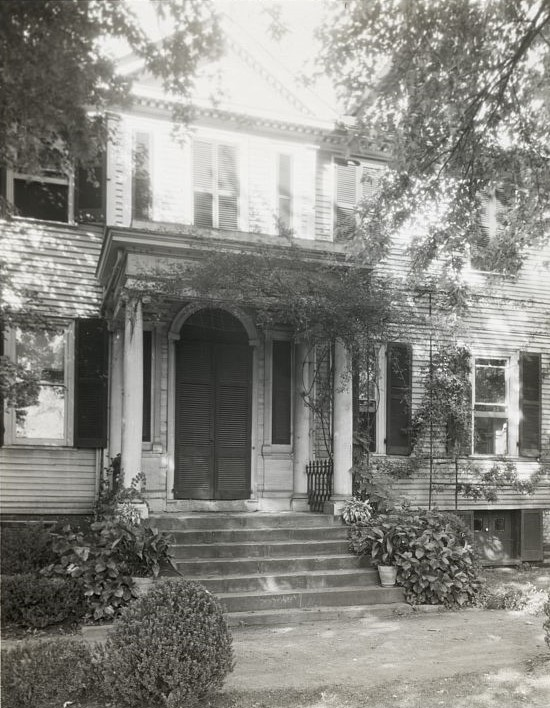
"Federal Hill," John Keim house, 504 Hanover Street, Fredericksburg, by Frances Benjamin Johnston, c. 1927.

Robert Brooke was the second son born to Anna Hay Taliaferro and her husband, Richard Brooke, at a family plantation (possibly "Smithfield") in Spotsylvania County in the Colony of Virginia. His birth year is uncertain; probably 1751 but possibly near 1760 or even 1761. His grandfather Robert Brooke, a skilled surveyor, had been one of Lt. Governor Alexander Spotswood's "Knights of the Golden Horseshoe Expedition" and the family was influential in nearby Essex County. Brooke had at least three brothers: Dr. Lawrence Brooke, Judge Francis T. Brooke, and John T. Brooke. All became patriots in the American Revolutionary War, and the latter two also served in the Virginia General Assembly.

Thus, Brooke was born into the First Families of Virginia and received a private education suitable for his class. He sailed to Scotland for further studies at Edinburgh University.

In 1766, Brooke married Mrs. Mary Ritchie Hopper (the Ritchies being another prominent Essex County family) in Tappahannock, Virginia, the Essex county seat. They had several children, including Richard Brooke (1787-1824), who would marry Selina Poe in Richmond and have children.

== Career ==
As he returned home at the beginning of the revolution, British admiral Howe captured his ship and sent Brooke back to England. He then traveled to Scotland, then France, and reached Virginia in a French vessel carrying arms for the continentals. Brooke joined Captain Larkin Smith's cavalry company, was captured at Westham near Richmond by Simcoe in 1781, was exchanged, and rejoined the army's 7th Continental line.

After the war, Brooke read law. On February 7, 1785, he and future U.S. Supreme Court justice Bushrod Washington were admitted to the Virginia bar and began their legal careers in Fredericksburg and surrounding counties.

According to 1787 Virginia property tax records, Brooke did not live in Essex county but owned nine horses and 51 cattle and enslaved 23 adults and 18 children there. Like his brother John T. Brooke, he owned a house in Fredericksburg (Gustavus Wallace paid tax on both city homes). According to the same state tax census, their father enslaved 22 adults and 20 children on his Spotsylvania County plantation and their brother Dr. Lawrence Brooke enslaved 6 adults and 8 children in Spotsylvania. Their grandfather's still-unresolved estate enslaved 20 adults and 19 children in nearby King William county. His brother Francis T. Brooke owned property in Fauquier County, but Humphrey Brooke paid the tax because Francis was underage.

In 1791, Spotsylvania County voters elected Robert Brooke as one of their representatives in the Virginia House of Delegates, alongside Francis Thornton (who had enslaved 18 adults and 3 children in Spotsylvania County, 10 adults and 8 children in King George County and 11 adults and 18 children in Gloucester county, all in the tax census four years earlier). Both men won re-election the following year, but in 1793 his brother John T. Brooke succeeded Thornton. In 1794 John W. Willis (whom Robert Brooke had succeeded three years earlier) replaced John T. Brooke. In that 1794 session, Governor Light Horse Harry Lee resigned and left the Commonwealth in command of federal forces to quell the Whiskey Rebellion, so fellow legislators elected Brooke governor in his stead. Brooke took the gubernatorial oath of office on December 1, 1794, and served two years.

In 1795 Robert Brooke built a home in Fredericksburg upon Federal Hill, which looked over Sandy Bottom to Marye's Heights, a thousand yards away.

When Brooke left office in 1796, legislators elected him, a Democratic-Republican, as the state's attorney-general to replace James Innes, who had resigned to accept a federal position as commissioner under Jay's Treaty. Fellow Fredericksburg attorney Bushrod Washington, President Washington's nephew, had also sought the position as state attorney general. Brooke defeated Washington on the second ballot with 89 votes to Washington's 71.

Brooke was a prominent Freemason in Virginia. In November 1795, he succeeded James Mercer as Grand Master of the Grand Lodge of Virginia and would, in turn, be succeeded by Major Benjamin Day of Fredericksburg in 1797.

== Death and legacy ==
Brooke died in Fredericksburg while still attorney general on February 27, 1800. The Library of Virginia holds his executive papers as governor. His former Fredericksburg home, which he named "Federal Hill", was occupied by Union forces during the American Civil War (as was his plantation in Spotsylvania County). The Fredericksburg house survives today as a private residence (with door and door canopy replaced from the adjacent photograph) although listed on the National Register of Historic Places.

In 1796, the Virginia General Assembly split what had been vast trans-Appalachian Ohio County and created Brooke County, which they named to honor the outgoing governor, though, since the American Civil War, it has been in West Virginia.

== Sources ==
- Maury Family Tree by Sue West for family—privately printed.
- Recollections of a Virginian in the Mexican, Indian, and Civil Wars by Maj. Gen. Dabney Herndon Maury
- Encyclopedia of Virginia Biography, Volume IIII—Governors of the State—1776–1861
- Obituaries in Fredericksburg Virginia Herald, February 28, 1800, and Richmond Virginia Argus, March 7, 1800.
- Biography in John T. Kneebone et al., eds., Dictionary of Virginia Biography (Richmond: Library of Virginia, 1998– ), 2:267–269. ISBN 0-88490-199-8.

Masonic offices
| Preceded by James Mercer | Grand Master of Grand Lodge of Virginia; 1796–1797 | Succeeded by Benjamin Day |
Political offices
| Preceded by Henry Lee III | Governor of Virginia; 1794–1796 | Succeeded by James Wood |
Legal offices
| Preceded by John Marshall (acting) | Attorney General of Virginia; 1796 – 1800 | Succeeded by Philip Norborne Nicholas |
