= James Wood (Virginia politician) =

American politician

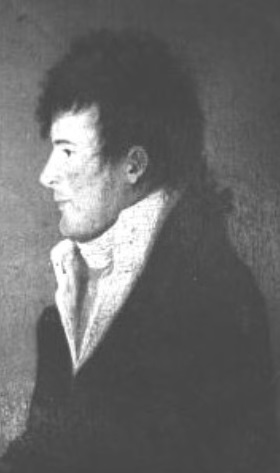

11th Governor of Virginia
- In office December 1, 1796 – December 1, 1799
- Preceded by: Robert Brooke
- Succeeded by: James Monroe

Personal details
- Born: January 28, 1741 Winchester, Virginia
- Died: June 16, 1813 (aged 72) Richmond, Virginia, US
- Party: Federalist
- Spouse: Jean Moncure
- Profession: Vestryman, soldier, politician

James Wood (January 28, 1741 – June 16, 1813) was an officer of the Continental Army during the American Revolution and would later serve as the 11th governor of Virginia from 1796-1799. He was an active member of the Virginia Society for the Abolition of Slavery.

== Early life ==
Born in Winchester, Virginia, on January 28, 1741, Wood was the son of Mary Rutherford and her husband James Wood, an immigrant from England who performed surveys for Thomas Fairfax, 6th Lord Fairfax of Cameron and helped found the town. He was educated privately and became active like his father in the local parish, Christ Episcopal Church in Winchester.

== Early career ==
In February 1760, he was appointed Deputy Clerk of the County Court for Frederick County. From 1766 to 1775, he served in the Virginia House of Burgesses. At different times during his five terms in the House, he would serve on the Committees for Courts and Justice, of Propositions and Grievances, and on the Committee for Religion. He married Jean Moncure, and they had no children who lived into adulthood.

Wood was commissioned a captain of Virginia troops by the Governor, Lord Dunmore, in 1774. He took part in the Battle of Point Pleasant during Dunmore's War and afterward negotiated the Treaty of Fort Pitt with the Shawnee Indians.

== American Revolutionary War service ==
In 1776 Wood was appointed lieutenant colonel of the Frederick County Militia. In February 1777, he became commander of the 12th Virginia Regiment, and he led the regiment during the Philadelphia campaign and Monmouth campaigns of the next two years. In late 1777, he quartered at the house also occupied by the family of Sally Wister, who described him as "of the most amiable of men." His regiment was redesignated the 8th Virginia Regiment in September 1778, and Wood was appointed Superintendent of the Convention Army when British prisoners from the Saratoga campaign were moved to Charlottesville, Virginia. He continued in that capacity until it was dissolved in January 1783, when he was promoted to brigadier general in the Virginia militia.

After the war, Wood became an original member of the Virginia Society of the Cincinnati.

== Politics ==
From 1784 to 1796, Wood was a member of Virginia's Executive Council, advising the Governor of Virginia and acted as Governor during multiple Governor's terms, though mainly when Henry Lee III, 9th Governor of Virginia, was commissioned by George Washington to command federal forces sent to subdue the Whisky Rebellion.

He was chosen as an elector for the 1789 election from Hampshire District. That District consisted of Berkeley County, Frederick County, Hampshire County, Hardy County, Harrison County, Monongalia County, Ohio County and Randolph County, which cover the area which is now the eastern part of West Virginia and the northernmost county of Virginia, all within Virginia's 1st congressional district, which also included Shenandoah County.

All ten of the Virginia electors who voted cast one of their two votes for George Washington. 5 of them cast their other vote for John Adams. 3 voted for George Clinton. 1 cast his for John Hancock. 1 cast his for John Jay. Which elector voted for which vice presidential candidate is not known.

A Federalist, in 1796, Wood was elected as Virginia's eleventh governor, beating Thomas Madison and Patrick Henry on the second ballot and served until 1799, after previously being the Federalist gubernatorial candidate in 1794. He would run for, and win two reelection campaigns in 1797 and 1798. In addition to being an original member of the Society of the Cincinnati, he was also a leading member of the Virginia Society for the Abolition of Slavery. Wood served as President of the Society of the Cincinnati from 1802 until his death.

== Death and legacy ==
Wood died in Richmond on June 16, 1813 at the age of 72. He was buried at Richmond in St. John's churchyard. His cause of death is unknown.

James Wood High School and James Wood Middle School in Frederick County, Virginia are named after the famous Revolutionary War Colonel, as is Wood County, West Virginia.

Political offices
Preceded by Robert Brooke	Governor of Virginia; 1796–1799	Succeeded by James Monroe
