= Capture of HMS Frolic =

USS Wasp vs HMS Frolic
- Part of the War of 1812
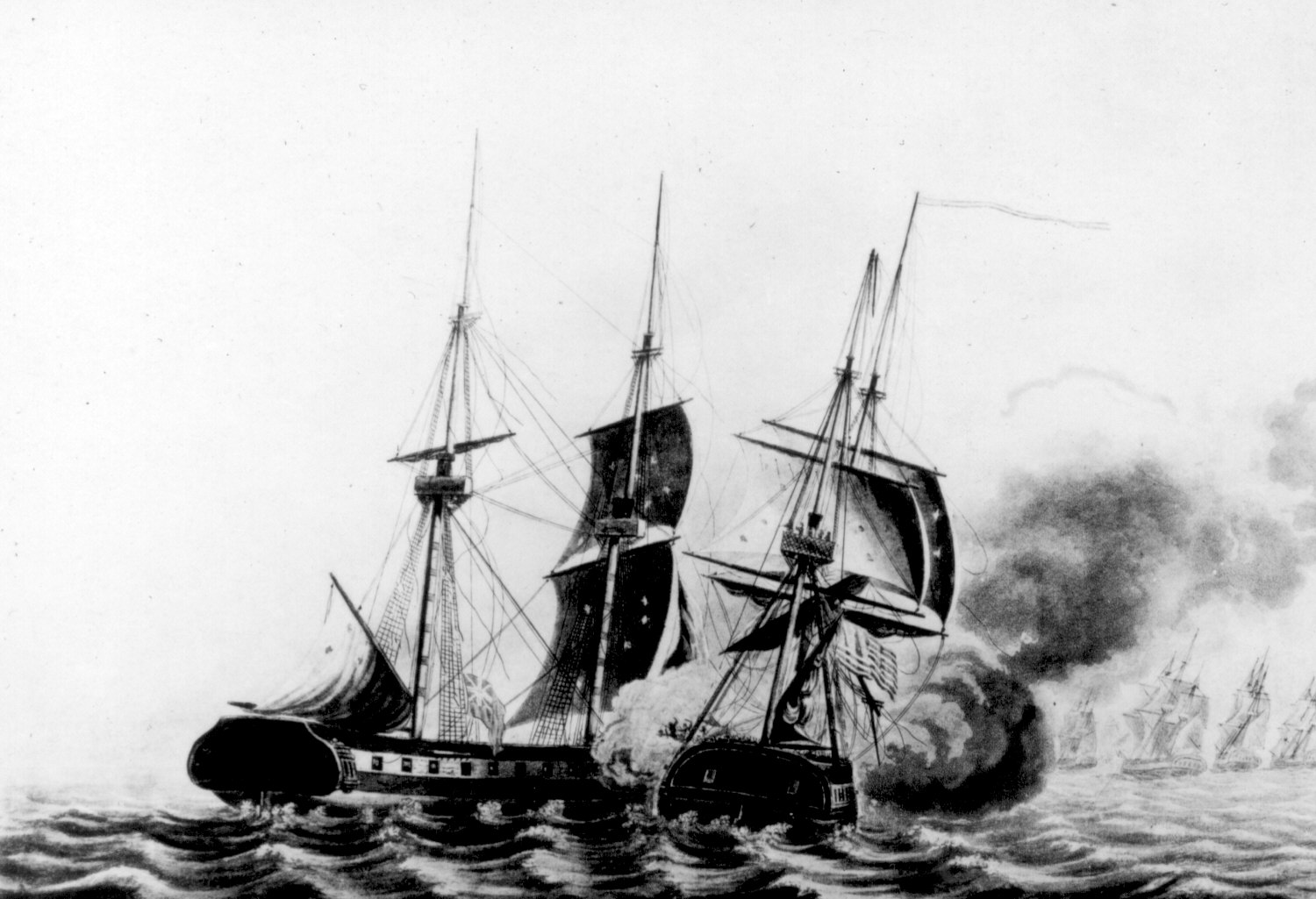
- USS Wasp captures HMS Frolic - Drawing and engraving by F. Kearny, based on sketch by Lieutenant Claxton
Date	18 October 1812
Location	Atlantic Ocean
Result	American victory (See aftermath section)

Belligerents
United States	United Kingdom

Commanders and leaders
Jacob Jones	Thomas Whinyates (WIA)

Strength
1 sloop-of-war (18 guns); 135 Marines and Sailors	1 brig-sloop (18 guns); 110 Marines and Sailors

Casualties and losses
3 killed 8 wounded Wasp damaged	30 killed 60+ wounded Folic severely damaged and briefly captured

The capture of HMS Frolic was a naval action fought in the Atlantic on 18 October 1812, between the sloop-of-war USS Wasp, commanded by Master Commandant Jacob Jones, and the Cruizer-class brig-sloop HM Brig Frolic, under Commander Thomas Whinyates. The Americans captured the British vessel, but both vessels shortly thereafter were captured by a British ship of the line which happened upon the scene of the battle.

== Prelude ==
On 12 September 1812, a convoy of fourteen British merchant vessels left the Gulf of Honduras, bound for Britain and escorted by the Frolic. On 16 October, about 300 miles (480 km) north of Bermuda, the convoy was scattered by a gale. Frolic's rigging was damaged, the main yard being carried away. During 17 October, the crew of the Frolic made some repairs, and by dark, six of the merchant sail had rejoined.

The American sloop of war USS Wasp had sailed from the Delaware River on 13 October and had run south-east to intercept ships sailing between Britain and the West Indies. It too had been slightly damaged by the gale on 16 October, losing its jib boom. At 11:30 pm on 17 October, the crew spotted several sails to the leeward (downwind). Jacob Jones, commanding the Wasp, kept his distance during the night, but at dawn he identified them as merchantmen, with a Royal Navy brig between them and Wasp (although Whinyates had hoisted Spanish ensigns in an attempt to lure Wasp within range).

== Battle ==
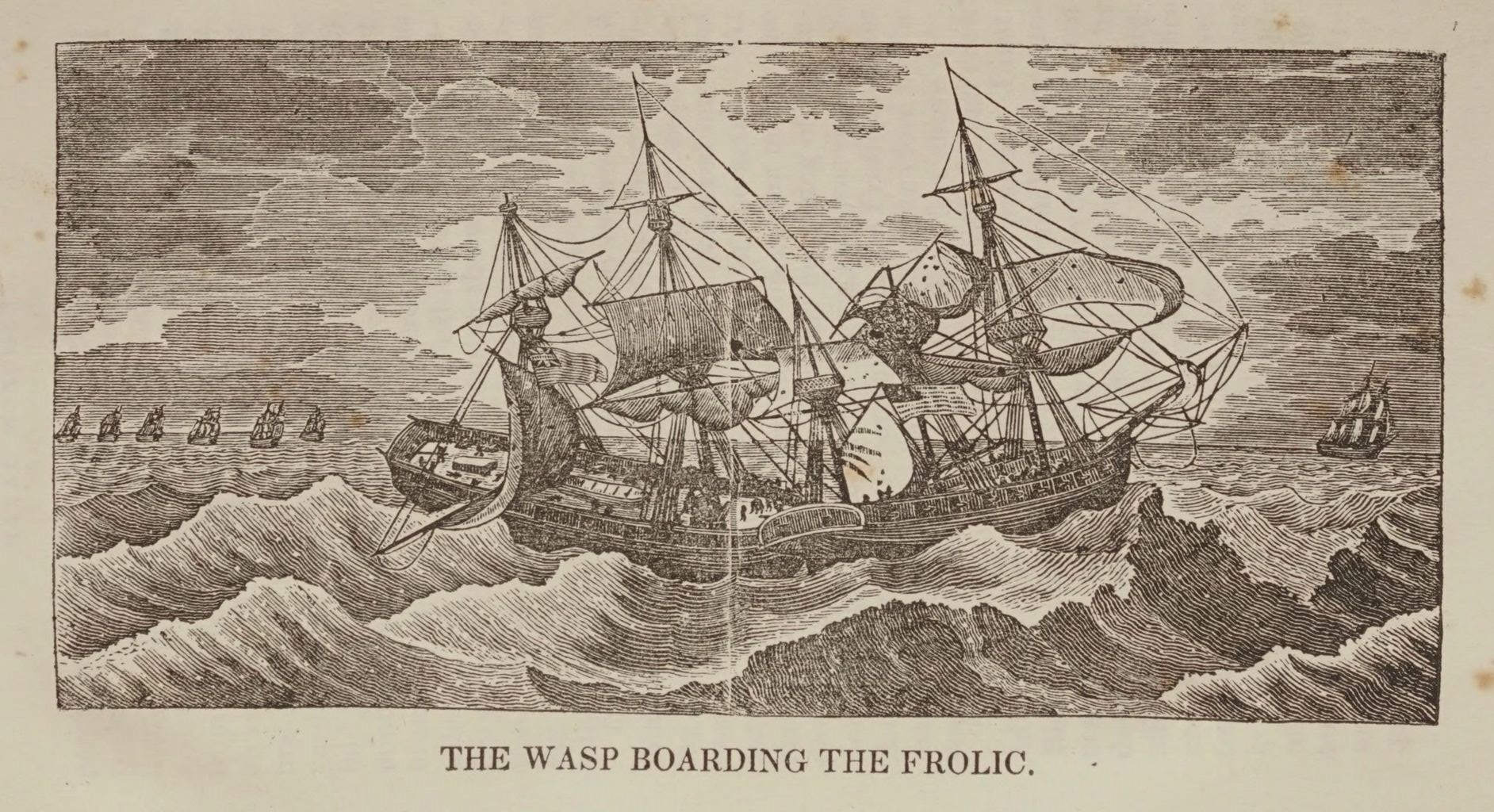
Wasp boarding Frolic

Although the weather had cleared, there was still a strong wind blowing and a heavy sea. Both vessels shortened sail and prepared for action. The crew of Frolic took down the jury mainyard and lashed it to the deck. Since both vessels carried a main armament of short-range carronades, there was no attempt at manoeuvering to gain advantage before the fight; instead, they closed to "within hail" (60 yards) and opened fire at 11:30 am, with the Wasp to the starboard and slightly to windward and the Frolic to port. The Wasp's crew fired low, into their opponent's hull, while the Frolic's gunners fired high, unusually for the Royal Navy, to disable their enemy's rigging. As the action continued, the ships closed together, until the American gunners struck the sides of the Frolic with their rammers as they reloaded.

After 22 minutes, Wasp's rigging was badly damaged, with the main topmast, mizzen topgallant mast and gaff being shot away, and almost every brace severed, making the ship unmanageable. The Frolic was even more heavily damaged, and the crew had suffered very heavy casualties. With both vessels incapable of being handled, the Wasp drew slightly ahead and the Frolic collided with the American ship. The Wasp fired a final raking broadside which delivered the coup de grâce. At 11:52 am, American sailors boarded the Frolic to find that every British officer and over half the crew, 90 men, were wounded or dead. The Americans themselves had suffered only 10 casualties. Although it was acknowledged that the British crew had fought to their utmost, it was clear that the American gunnery had been far superior to that of the British.

== Aftermath ==
Shortly after the fighting ended, both the Frolic's masts fell. An American prize crew went aboard the Frolic and attempted to repair the rigging, but a few hours later a British 74-gun ship of the line, HMS Poictiers (commanded by Captain John Beresford) came into view. Frolic was still unmanageable, and with its damaged rigging Wasp was soon overtaken and surrendered in the face of impossible odds. Beresford was due to join the fleet blockading the American coast, but thought it necessary to collect Frolic's convoy and take them to Bermuda, where they were forced to remain for several days until another escort could be found.

Master Commandant Jacob Jones and his crew were soon released by an exchange of prisoners. Jones was promoted and appointed to command USS Macedonian, which had been captured from the Royal Navy on 25 October. He later served as second in command to Commodore Isaac Chauncey on Lake Ontario.

Frolic had been too badly damaged to fight again and was broken up in November 1813. Wasp was taken into service in the Royal Navy as HMS Loup Cervier (renamed HMS Peacock in 1814), but disappeared off Virginia in 1814 and presumed wrecked.
