= HMS Mackerel (1804) =

19th century Royal Navy schooner

History

United Kingdom
- Name: HMS Mackerel
- Ordered: 23 June 1803
- Builder: Goodrich & Co. (prime contractor), Bermuda
- Laid down: 1803
- Launched: 1804
- Fate: Sold 14 December 1815

General characteristics
- Type: Ballahoo-class schooner
- Tons burthen: 70 41/94 (bm)
- Length: Overall: 55 ft 2 in (16.8 m); Keel: 40 ft 10 1/2 in (12.5 m)
- Beam: 18 ft 0 in (5.5 m)
- Depth of hold: 9 ft 0 in (2.7 m)
- Sail plan: Schooner
- Complement: 20
- Armament: 4 × 12-pounder carronades

HMS Mackerel was a Royal Navy Ballahoo-class schooner of four 12-pounder carronades and a crew of 20. The prime contractor for the vessel was Goodrich & Co., in Bermuda, and she was launched in 1804. Given that she served entirely during the Napoleonic Wars and the War of 1812, she had an unusually peaceful and uneventful career, primarily on the Newfoundland Station, before she was sold in 1815.

== Service ==
She was commissioned in May 1804 at Bermuda under Lieutenant Peter S. Prieur for the Newfoundland station. Later that year Lieutenant Richard Williams, who had received his promotion on 13 December 1804, assumed command, after serving as a Master's Mate on Isis. Williams joined Mackerel in Bermuda, where he fitted her out. One of her initial accomplishments was to salvage the main deck guns and bower anchor from Tartar when Tartar grounded in Murray's Roads, Bermuda. (Tartar was later refloated.) Next, Mackerel, with 57 French prisoners on board, narrowly escaped being wrecked in gale in the Bermudas. For his services he received the thanks of Admiral Sir Andrew Mitchel, chief of the Halifax, Nova Scotia, station. Mackerel then patrolled the southwest coast of Newfoundland. Williams seized the cargoes of whale oil of two American vessels poaching there and ordered the Americans to leave British waters. During this time Mackerel twice had the honour of bearing the flag of Admiral Sir Erasmus Gower.

In 1805 Lieutenant John G.M'B. McKillop succeeded Williams.

His replacement, in 1807, was Lieutenant Thomas Bishop. In November 1808 he sailed her to Britain. On the way she encountered a gale and had to throw all her guns overboard to lighten her.

Between 22 November 1808 and 19 February 1809 Mackerel was in Portsmouth, refitting. In February Lieutenant William Carter took command at Spithead and sailed her back to Newfoundland. Late in the year Lieutenant Thomas Lee assumed command and sailed her on the Newfoundland station on coast patrol and fisheries duties.

By 1812 Lieutenant Parker had taken command of Mackerel, and on 15 April 1812 sailed for South America. Apparently, she called at New York in June to deliver some official dispatches. The acting commander reported that her commander had been killed when a sailor fell from a mast and landed on him. (Note: The National Maritime Museum database confirms that Lieutenant Parker was killed.)

As Mackerel left New York on 18 June she passed the USS United States under Captain Stephen Decatur. Apparently war had been declared two days earlier, but the news only arrived in New York on 20 June. After the frigate Belvidera arrived in Nova Scotia with the news that war had been declared and that the USS President, in company with the USS Congress and the USS United States, had fired on her, Mackerel carried the news to Portsmouth, arriving there on 27 July.

She was still at Portsmouth on 31 July when the British authorities seized the American ships there and at Spithead on the outbreak of the War of 1812. She therefore shared, with numerous other vessels, in the subsequent prize money for these vessels: Belleville, Aeos, Janus, Ganges, and Leonidas. (Note: So many vessels shared in the prize money that the amounts per man were small. A second-class share, that of a lieutenant, was £3 11s; a sixth-class share, that of an ordinary seaman, was 4s 1d.)

On 14 August Mackerel accompanied Admiral Sir John Borlase Warren, who was sailing to Halifax, Nova Scotia, on San Domingo, together with Poictiers, Sophie, and Magnet. Magnet disappeared during the voyage and was presumed foundered with all hands.

== Fate ==
Lieutenant Thomas Hughes recommissioned her in December 1812 and remained in command into 1815. In October 1813 she was reported sailing from Cadiz to London. The Admiralty put the "Mackarel schooner, of 70 tons" up for sale on 30 November 1815. She was sold at Plymouth on 14 December 1815 for £400.
