= USS Vixen (1803) =

United States Navy schooner

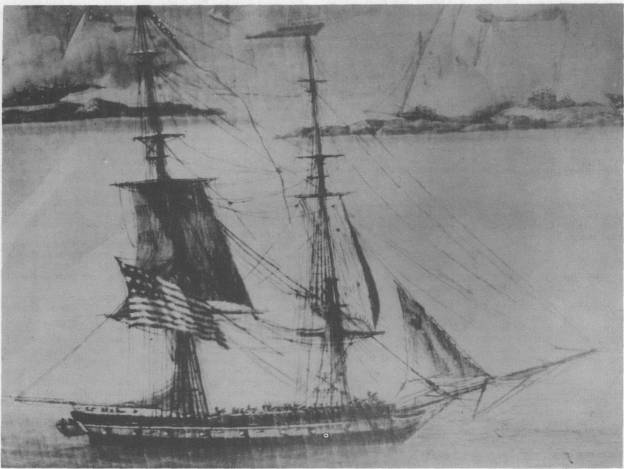
- Artist's rendering of Vixen rigged as a brig

History

United States
- Name: USS Vixen
- Ordered: 28 February 1803
- Builder: William Price
- Cost: $20,872
- Laid down: 1803
- Launched: 25 June 1803
- Commissioned: 3 August 1803
- Fate: Captured by the British, 22 November 1812, and wrecked 27 November

General characteristics
- Type: Schooner
- Displacement: 170 long tons (170 t)
- Length: 83 ft 6 in (25.45 m)
- Beam: 23 ft 2 in (7.06 m)
- Depth of hold: 9 ft 6 in (2.90 m)
- Propulsion: Sail
- Complement: 111 officers and enlisted
- Armament: 14 × 6-pounder

USS Vixen was a schooner in the United States Navy during the First Barbary War. Vixen was one of four vessels authorized by Congress on 28 February 1803. She was built at Baltimore, Maryland, in the spring of 1803, by the agency of Col. Stricker. Lt. Andrew Sterrett was ordered to assist in supervision of construction in late May. In a letter dated 7 June Lieutenant John Smith was ordered to take over supervision of construction. She was launched on 25 June, Lieutenant Smith in command.

== Service ==
=== First Barbary War ===
Designed especially for operations in the shoal waters off the coast of Tripoli, Vixen joined Commodore Edward Preble's squadron for duty in the First Barbary War (1801–1805) immediately upon her commissioning. She sailed from Baltimore on 3 August 1803 under the command of Lieutenant John Smith, arriving in Hampton Roads on 5 August, sailing from there on 11 August and deployed with the squadron off Gibraltar on 14 September. Commodore Preble dispatched Vixen and the frigate Philadelphia in October to establish a blockade of Tripoli. However, Vixen soon departed in search of two Tripolitan warships and was not present when Philadelphia grounded and was captured on September 30th. Instead, she carried the dispatches announcing the loss of the frigate and the imprisonment of Captain William Bainbridge, his officers, and crew back to Gibraltar in December.

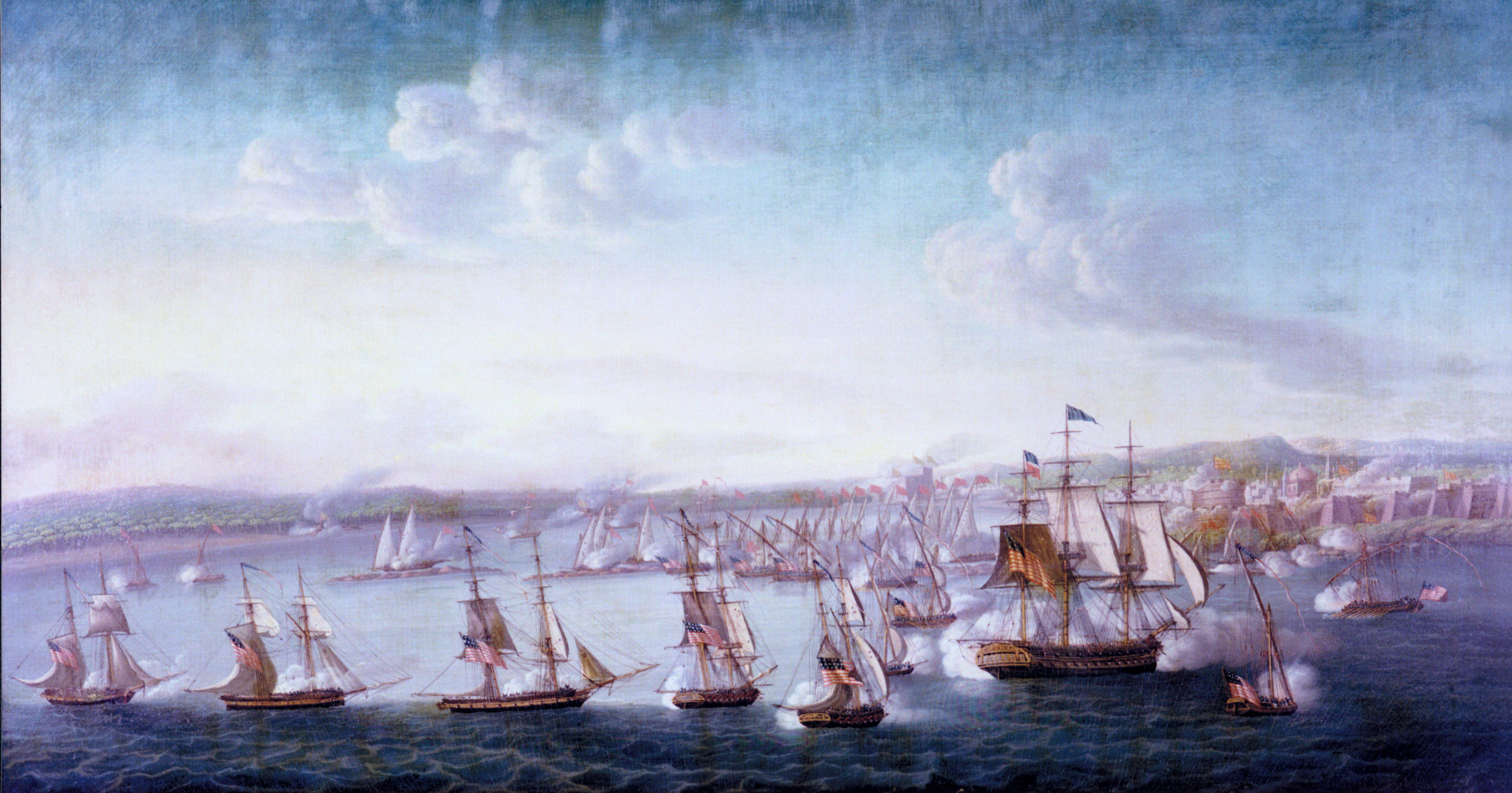
Vixen (fifth from left) participating in the bombardment of Tripoli, 3 August 1804, painting by Michele Felice Cornè, 1752-1845

Retribution for this latest action by the Tripoli pirates came swiftly and dramatically. Lt. Stephen Decatur, Jr., boarded and destroyed Philadelphia where she lay in Tripoli harbor on 16 February 1804. On 24 February she was in a collision with Merchantman "Port Mary" that she was convoying off Gozo. There was damage to her stern, boat davits, her boar was lost and main boom broken. Commodore Preble later followed this up with five heavy bombardments of the pirate state on the 3, 7, 24, and 28 August, and on 3 September. Vixen participated in all these actions, and performed tactical service by helping to coordinate the movements of the various American vessels. While in Malta in 16 October 1804, she was rerigged as a brig, ostensibly to improve her sailing qualities. On 3 July command changed from Master Commandant John Smith to Master Commandant George Cox. On 30 July she was with the U.S. fleet at Tunis., now under Commodore John Rodgers, in actions before Tunis in August 1805. On 3 June 1806 sailed from Gibraltar for the United States, arriving at Charleston, South Carolina on 20 July, then departing 28 July for the Washington Navy Yard, arriving 3 August 1806.

=== Between wars ===
Vixen was placed in ordinary at the Washington Navy Yard immediately upon her return from the Mediterranean. She left the yard one year later and subsequently operated along the Atlantic coast under Lieutenants James Lawrence and Charles Ludlow.

On 18 June 1810, Vixen came upon on the sloop HMS Moselle off Barbados, which fired on her. Commander Henry Boys apologized to the Americans, reporting that he had been unable to make out her colors and that he thought she might be a French privateer that he was seeking. The Americans suffered one casualty, a man wounded in the mouth by a splinter.

=== War of 1812 ===
Vixen continued patrolling the Atlantic coast until the outbreak of the War of 1812, at which time she sailed along the southern coast under Master Commandant Christopher Gadsden, Jr., and, after his death on 28 August 1812, under Lt. George Washington Reed, youngest son of General Joseph Reed. During one of her war cruises among the West Indies, Vixen encountered the 32-gun British frigate Southampton, under the command of Captain James Lucas Yeo. Southampton chased, intercepted, and captured Vixen on 22 November 1812.

Yeo described Vixen as a brig armed with twelve 18-pounder carronades and two 9-pounder guns. She had a crew of 130 men and had been out five weeks but had not captured anything.

== Fate ==
Both vessels (Southampton and Vixen) were wrecked five days after Vixen's capture on Conception Island in the Bahamas. All the officers and crews survived. Lt. Reed, however, died later of yellow fever in Jamaica before he could be exchanged.

== List of the known Ports of Call ==
3 August 1803 - Left Baltimore.

14 September 1803 - Arrived at Gibraltar.

7 October 1803 - Arrived off Tripoli with USS Philadelphia.

28 July 1804 - Closed on Tripolitan coast with USS Argus, USS Constitution, USS Syren, USS Nautilus, USS Enterprise and USS Scourge. Later in August USS John Adams and USS Intrepid joined. Multiple bombardments of Tripoli were initiated in the following weeks.

6 September 1804 - Left Tripoli for Syracuse.

7 September 1804 - Left Syracuse for Tripoli.

16 (or 18) September 1804 - Arrived at Malta.

28 October 1804 - Left Malta for Syracuse.

29 October 1804 - Arrived at Port of Syracuse.

3 November 1804 - Left Syracuse for Messina.

7 November 1804 - Arrived at Port of Syracuse. USS Essex, USS John Adams, USS Argus, USS Constitution and USS Congress were anchored there.

11 November 1804 - Departed to patrol off Tripoli with USS Constellation, USS President and USS Nautilus.

27 November 1804 - Arrived at New Tripoli. Fired a shot on shore.

6 December 1804 - Arrived at Malta.

11 December 1804 - Left Malta to patrol off Tripoli.

29 December 1804 - Arrived at Port of Syracuse. She joined there USS Essex, USS President, USS Constellation and USS Congress.

4 February 1805 - Departed Syracuse.

7 February 1805 - Arrived at Malta.

11 February 1805 - Arrived at Syracuse.

22 February 1805 - Left Syracuse for Malta in a company of USS President.

23 February 1805 - Anchored in the Harbor of Valletta, Malta

1 March 1805 - Left Malta for a cruise off Cape Bon Tripoli.

6 March 1805 - On and off Tripoli, supporting the blockade.

18 April 1805 - Left her patrol duty at Tripoli.

21 April 1805 - Arrived at Malta.

22 April 1805 - Arrived at Port of Syracuse.

10 May 1805 - Departed Syracuse.

11 May 1805 - Arrived at Malta.

17 May 1805 - Departed Malta for Tunis.

21 May 1805 - Off Tunis.

24 May 1805 - Arrived at Malta.

26 May 1805 - Departed Malta for Tripoli.

28 May 1805 - Anchored at the harbor of Tripoli.

4 June 1805 - Observed the Stars and Stripes flying again over the U.S. Consulate in Tripoli.

1 August 1805 - Vixen along with the rest of the Rodgers's sixteen-warship squadron arrived to Tunis for a show of force as Bey Hamouda of Tunis was considering to declare war on the United States.
