= Charles Ludlow =

United States Navy officer

Charles Ludlow (1790–1839) was an officer in the United States Navy during the War of 1812. He served in 1807 as a Lieutenant in USS Vixen, then in USS Constitution in the Mediterranean theater. Just before the War of 1812 broke out Captain Ludlow was the commandant on USS President, the flagship of Commodore John Rodgers which patrolled the northern seaboard from British naval attacks on American merchant vessels.

Just after the War of 1812 broke out Ludlow received orders from Commodore William Bainbridge to take USS John Adams from Boston to New York for repairs. After a trial at sea and an inspection he concluded that John Adams was only fit to be a merchant ship.

Ludlow died at New Windsor, New York.

== See also ==
- Stephen Decatur
- Timeline of the War of 1812

== Sources ==
- Dudley, William S.; Crawford, Michael J. (1985). The Naval War of 1812 :a documentary history. Vol. I. Washington : Naval Historical Center, Dept. of Navy. ISBN 9780160020421.
- Dudley, William S.; Crawford, Michael J. (1985). The Naval War of 1812 :a documentary history. Vol. II. Washington : Naval Historical Center, Dept. of Navy.
- Malcomson, Robert (2006). Historical Dictionary of the War of 1812. Scarecrow Press. ISBN 978-0-8108-6516-7.
