= Jacob Jones (naval officer) =

United States naval officer (1768–1850)

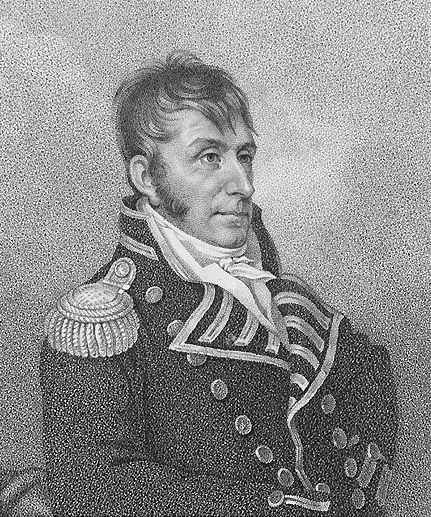
- Commodore Jones
- Born: March 1768; Smyrna, Delaware, British America
- Died: August 3, 1850 (aged 81–82); Philadelphia, Pennsylvania, U.S.
- Burial place: Wilmington and Brandywine Cemetery, Wilmington, Delaware, US
- Military career
- Allegiance: United States
- Branch: United States Navy
- Service years: 1799–1850
- Rank: Commodore
- Commands: USS Wasp; Mediterranean Squadron; USS Macedonian; USS Constitution; U.S. Naval Forces in the Pacific; Philadelphia Naval Asylum
- Conflicts: Quasi-War; War of 1812; First Barbary War; Second Barbary War

Commodore Jacob Nicholas Jones (March 1768 – August 3, 1850) was an officer in the United States Navy during the Quasi-War with France, the First Barbary War, the Second Barbary War, and the War of 1812.

== Biography ==
Jones' birthplace was on a farm about one mile northwest of the town of Smyrna, Delaware Colony. His father was a farmer of exemplary moral and religious character and his mother was of a family greatly respected. She died when he was an infant. His father soon followed her to the grave and at four years of age he was an orphan. It is not clear how he became a doctor. Educated in medicine and practicing as a doctor, he was later appointed as Clerk of the Delaware Supreme Court. He was married to Anna Matilda Sykes, daughter of James Sykes the 15th Governor of Delaware; she died before he joined the United States Navy.

=== Midshipman ===
Jones joined the United States Navy in 1799 at the age of 31, very old for the times, when a midshipman could be as young as 10. Some think he joined the Navy because of grief after the death of his wife. He spent 22 months as an acting midshipman.

=== Lieutenant ===
During the Quasi-War with France, he served under Commodore John Barry in the frigate USS United States and was commissioned a lieutenant February 27, 1801. First Barbary War: Jones was serving on USS Constellation in October, 1802 when he was arrested for aiding and abetting the murder of Marine Capt. James McKnight by Navy Lt. Richard H. L. Lawson in a duel on 14 October at Leghorn. Jones joined the crew of Philadelphia on May 24, 1803, as second lieutenant (2nd mate). On October 31, 1803, he was taken prisoner with the rest of Philadelphia's crew by the Bey of Tripoli and held until liberated in June 1805.

=== Master Commandant ===
On April 20, 1810, Jones received promotion to master commandant, and on June 4, he took command of USS Wasp. In October 1812, Jones and Wasp sailed on an Atlantic cruise. On October 13 he captured the British 12-gun brig HMS Dolphin.

Despite storm damage to his ship, he attacked a British convoy on October 18 and, following an intense battle, captured the Royal Navy sloop of war HMS Frolic, in a fierce engagement. Both ships were seriously damaged and were captured by the 74-gun ship of the line HMS Poictiers. Still, Jones was widely admired among Americans and when he returned to the United States after an exchange of prisoners, he received a gold medal from the United States Congress.

=== Captain ===
Jones was promoted to the rank of captain in March 1813 and given command of the frigate USS Macedonian. He spent time in Decatur's squadron, which was bottled up at New London during 1814. Later, Captain Jones was sent to the Lake Ontario theater, where he commanded the frigate USS Mohawk during the last year of the war.

During the second and final Barbary War, in 1815, Jones again commanded Macedonian. Service as captain of the frigate USS Guerriere followed in 1816–1818.

=== Commodore ===
Jones was Commodore of the United States' squadrons in the Mediterranean in 1821–1823 and in the Pacific in 1826–1829. He was a Navy Commissioner in Washington, DC, between those tours at sea and held important commands ashore at Baltimore and New York during the 1830s and 1840s. He received his final assignment, as commandant of the Philadelphia Naval Asylum in 1847. Commodore Jacob Jones held that position until his death.

== Death and legacy ==
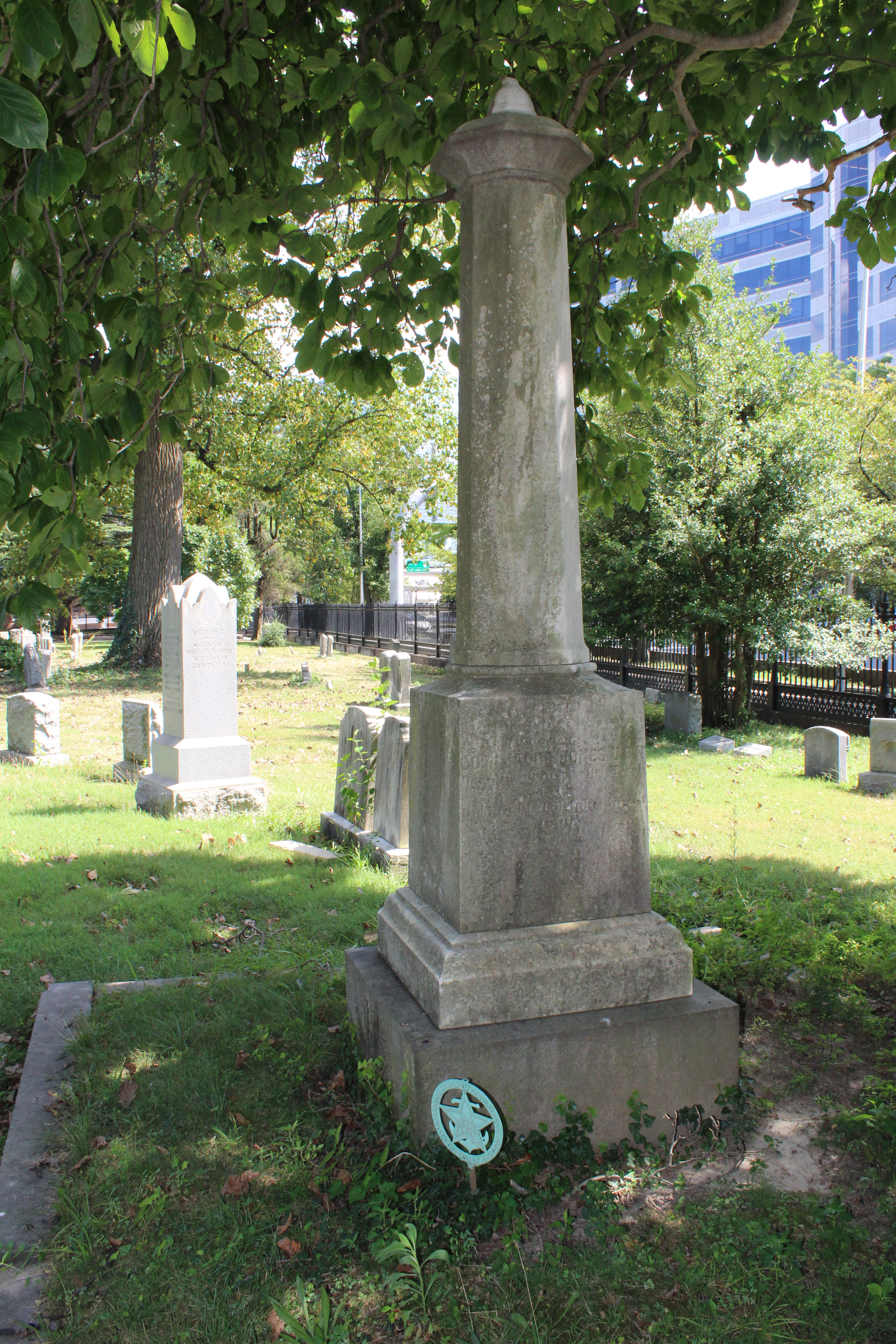
Jacob Jones Memorial in Wilmington and Brandywine Cemetery

Jones died on August 3, 1850, and is interred at the Wilmington and Brandywine Cemetery in Wilmington, Delaware.

Three ships, USS Jacob Jones, have been named for him. Jones Island of Washington state is also named for Jones.
