= HMS Magnet (1809) =

Sloop of the Royal Navy

History

France
- Name: San Joseph
- Builder: Saint-Malo
- Laid down: 1807
- Captured: 13 February 1809

United Kingdom
- Name: HMS Magnet
- Acquired: 1809 by capture
- Fate: Foundered September 1812

General characteristics
- Tons burthen: 28585/94 (bm)
- Length: Overall: 90 ft 5 in (27.6 m); Keel: 69 ft 4 5/8 in (21.1 m)
- Beam: 27 ft 10 in (8.5 m)
- Depth of hold: 10 ft 3 in (3.1 m)
- Sail plan: Sloop
- Complement: Privateer:96; Royal Navy:90
- Armament: Privateer:14 guns; Royal Navy:12 × 18-pounder carronades + 2 × 6-pounder chase guns

HMS Magnet was the former French privateer San Joseph or San Josepho, built in 1807, that the British captured in 1809. The Royal Navy took her into service as HMS Magnet. She disappeared, presumed to have foundered with all hands, while sailing to Halifax, Nova Scotia, in August or September 1812.

== Privateer ==
San Joseph was a brig-corvette commissioned in Saint-Malo in November 1807 under François-Auguste Blanchard. She made two cruises between 1807 and February 1809.

== Capture ==
On 12 February 1809, HMS Undaunted (1807), Captain Thomas James Maling, sighted the French privateer San Joseph in the Channel. Undaunted discovered San Josephe at dawn, taking her after a chase lasting four hours, and brought her into Spithead the next day. The privateer, which was only four days out from St. Malo, was provisioned for two months and pierced for 18 guns, but mounted only 14, and had a crew of 96 men. (Note: The prize money for San Joseph was paid out in May 1810, and Captain Maling's share amounted to £1,078 1s 5d (about four times his annual pay), while the commissioned officers received £134 15s 2d, the warrant officers £59 17s 10d, and the rest of the crew between £21 0s 9d and £2 6s 9d dependent on rating.)

== Career ==
The Admiralty named San Joseph HMS Magnet, Magnet just having been lost. She underwent fitting at Portsmouth between 14 February and 10 July. She was commissioned under the command of Commander John Smith, who was preparing her for the ill-fated Walcheren Campaign. She served in the campaign and was among the many vessels that shared in the prize money for having served in the Schelde between 30 July and 16 August.

After the Campaign, Magnet apparently saw much boat service at the "entrance of the German Rivers."

Magnet was in company with Desiree on 15 February 1810 when they captured Hoffnung, Lund, master. That same day Desiree and Magnet captured Harmonia. Then on 3 March Magnet recaptured Jean.

Magnet captured the Frouw Heintze on 5 October.

Commander Ferdinand Moore Maurice replaced Smith in 1811. (Note: He was the twin brother of Captain James Wilkes Maurice. After James had conducted a spirited defense of the island of Anholt, Charles Philip Yorke, First Lord of the Admiralty, promised in a letter to James dated 11 April 1811, to appoint Ferdinand to a sloop "at an early opportunity".) On 14 April 1812, Magnet sailed for South America.

== Fate ==
On 14 August Magnet accompanied Admiral Sir John Borlase Warren, who was sailing to Halifax, Nova Scotia, on San Domingo, together with Poictiers, Sophie, and Mackerel. Magnet parted company with the squadron in a tremendous gale about two weeks out of Halifax, and never arrived. She is believed to have foundered with all hands.

== Plans ==
David Lyon has published the plans of Magnet in his book The Sailing Navy List.
