= USS Wasp (1807) =

US and later British sloop-of-war

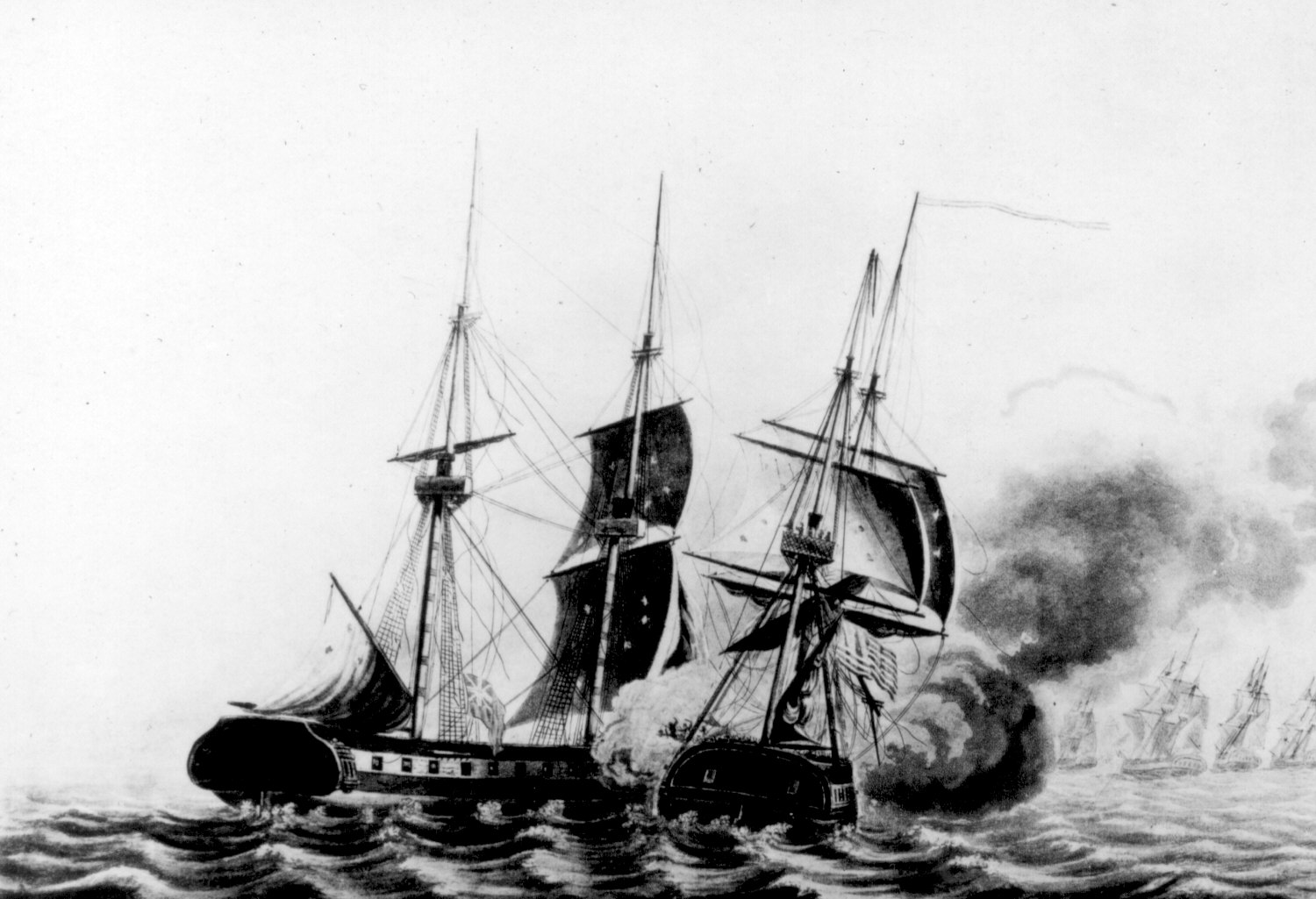
- USS Wasp captures HMS Frolic

History

United States
- Name: USS Wasp
- Builder: Washington Navy Yard
- Cost: $40,000
- Launched: 1806
- Commissioned: 1807
- Fate: Captured, 18 October 1812

United Kingdom
- Name: HMS Loup Cervier
- Acquired: 15 October 1812 (by capture)
- Commissioned: 1813
- Renamed: HMS Peacock (c. March 1814)
- Fate: Foundered 23 July 1814 off Virginia Capes

General characteristics
- Type: Sloop-of-war, ship rigged
- Tons burthen: 43424/98, or 450 (US) (bm)
- Length: Overall:105 ft 10 1/2 in (32.3 m); Keel:85 ft 10 1/2 in (26.2 m)
- Beam: 30 ft 10 in (9.4 m)
- Draft: 14 ft 2 in (4.3 m)
- Depth of hold: 14 ft 0 in (4.3 m)
- Propulsion: Sail
- Notes: 18 guns, 24 pounder carronades

General characteristics (US Service)
- Complement: 140 officers and enlisted
- Armament: 16 × 32-pounder carronades + 2 × 12-pounder guns

General characteristics (British service)
- Complement: 121 officers and enlisted
- Armament: 14 × 32-pounder carronades + 2 × 6-pounder chase guns

USS Wasp was a 14-gun sloop-of-war of the United States Navy captured by the British in the early months of the War of 1812. She was constructed in 1806 at the Washington Navy Yard, was commissioned sometime in 1807, Master Commandant John Smith in command. In 1812 she captured HMS Frolic, but was immediately herself captured. The British took her into service first as HMS Loup Cervier and then as HMS Peacock. She was lost, presumed foundered with all hands, in mid-1814.

== US Service ==
In 1808 Wasp was heavily involved in supporting Jefferson's Embargo, including delivering an army garrison from New York City to Passamaquoddy in June, patrolling Casco Bay, Maine, in the winter of 1808–1809, and remaining at Portland until May, 1809. Until 1809 she was commanded by Master Commandant John Smith. In the final weeks of 1810, she was operating from the ports of Charleston, South Carolina, and Savannah, Georgia, presumably patrolling the waters along southern Atlantic coast. In 1811, she sailed to Hampton Roads, Virginia, where she and the brig Nautilus joined frigates United States and Congress in forming a squadron commanded by Commodore Stephen Decatur.

On 9 March 1812 Wasp sailed from New York for France to deliver an Anglo-Irish mercenary named John Henry who had sold intelligence to President Madison indicating Britain's interest in determining if the New England states wished to secede from the union. The correspondence, known as the Henry Papers, helped build outrage in Congress against Britain that led to the declaration of war, however the documents are now widely believed to have been a forgery.

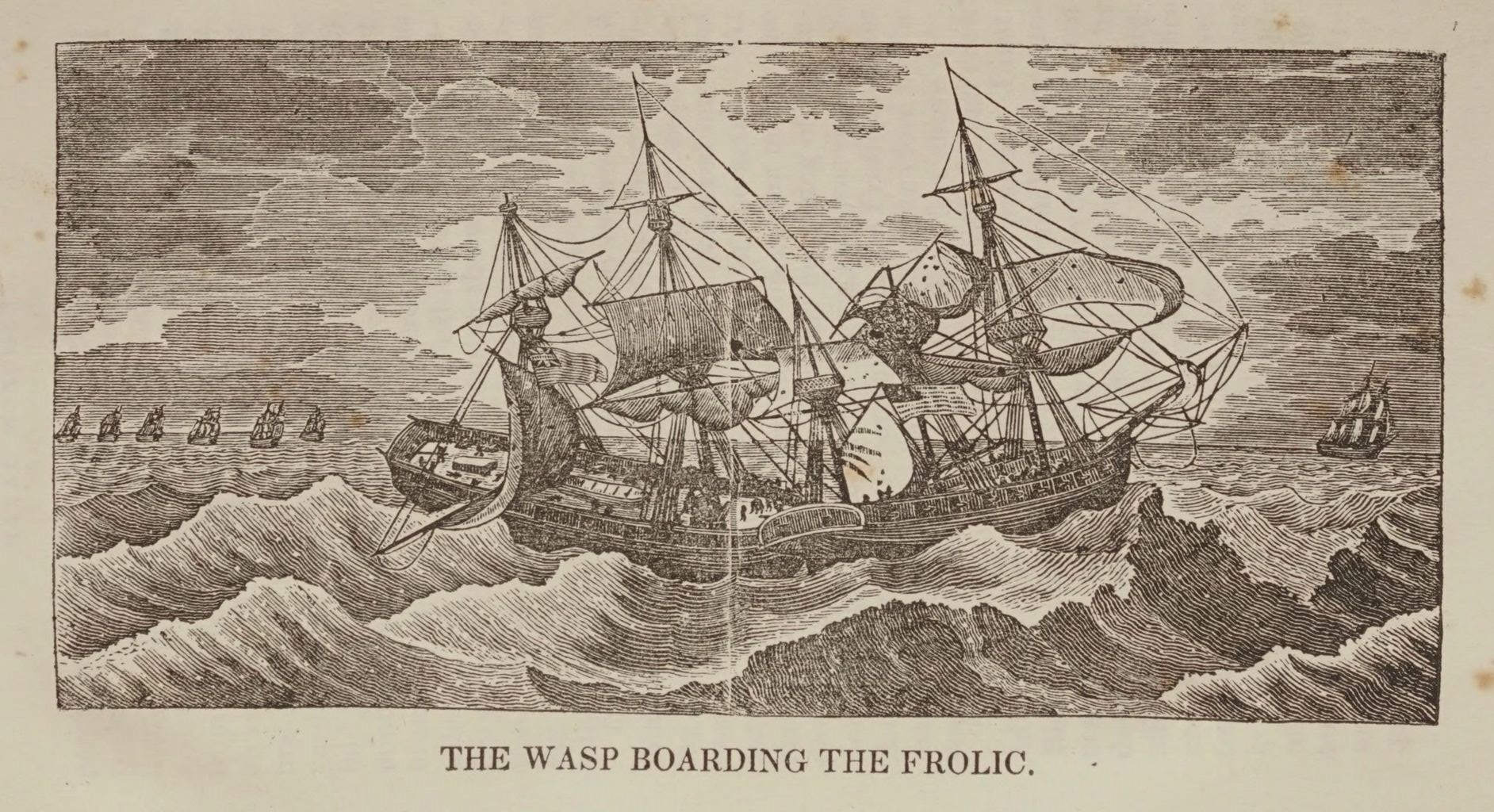
USS Wasp boarding HMS Frolic

Wasp, under the command of Master Commandant Jacob Jones continued to operate along the coast of the middle states after the United States went to war with Britain in June 1812. On 13 October, she sailed from the Delaware River, two days later she encountered a heavy gale that tore away her jib boom and washed two crewmen overboard. The following evening, Wasp encountered a squadron of ships and, in spite of the fact that two of their number appeared to be large men-of-war, made for them straight away. She finally caught the enemy convoy the following morning and discovered six merchantmen under the protection of a 22-gun sloop-of-war, HMS Frolic.

At half past eleven in the morning of 18 October, Wasp and Frolic closed to do battle. The engagement would be the first and only time Wasp saw combat. The two ships commenced fire at a distance of 50 to 60 yards (46 to 55 m). In a short, sharp, fight, both ships sustained heavy damage to masts and rigging, but Wasp prevailed over her adversary by boarding her. The victory was short lived. A British 74-gun ship-of-the-line, HMS Poictiers, appeared on the scene. Frolic was crippled and Wasp's rigging and sails were badly damaged. At 4:00 p.m. Jones had no choice but to surrender Wasp; he could neither run nor fight such an overwhelming opponent.

== British service ==
Wasp was briefly given the name Loup Cervier on her capture. (Note: Loup cervier is the French name for the Canada lynx.) She was commissioned in 1813 on the Halifax station under Captain Charles Gill. Captain William William Mends succeeded Gill, taking command on 26 February 1813.

In June Loup Cervier was off New London, where she helped blockade the squadron under Commodore Stephen Decatur. James Biddle, who had been first lieutenant of Wasp, had become captain of USS Hornet. He issued a challenge to Mends that their two vessels meet in an engagement. Decatur forbade the engagement until he was sure that it would be an even match. The day after he gave his assent Loup Cervier left New London to patrol elsewhere.

Thereafter Loup Cervier captured or recaptured four vessels. On 27 June she captured the schooner Little Bill, John Roach master, which had been sailing from St Bartholomew to North Carolina. She was carrying a cargo of sugar and molasses. Little Bill was restored. Another report gives the vessel's name as Little Bell.

Then on 28 August Loup Cervier captured the ship Hope, of 468 tons (bm), J. Emery master. Hope was sailing from Lisbon to Newport, Rhode Island, with a cargo of salt. She too was restored.

On 29 October Loup Cervier recaptured the brig John and Mary, T. Collins, master. Lastly, Loup Cervier was one of four British warships that shared in the capture of the sloop Emeline, of 44 tons (bm), O. Adams, master. Emeline was sailing from New York to Rhode Island with a cargo of 240 barrels of flour.

At some point Loup Cervier was renamed Peacock, Hornet having captured and sunk the Cruizer-class brig-sloop Peacock in February 1813. Mends was appointed to command of Terpsichore on 23 March 1814. Peacock may then have been briefly under the command of Captain G. Donnett. In April or shortly thereafter Commander Richard Coote of Borer was promoted to post captain and transferred to Peacock.

Peacock was one of the five British warships that on 21 April 1814 captured the Swedish brig Minerva. Then on 15 May, Peacock recaptured the Swedish ship Providentia, of four guns, 400 tons, and 17 men. She had been sailing from Amelia Island to Lisbon with a cargo of pine, cedar, etc. when an American privateer had captured her. That same day, Peacock recaptured the Russian ship Hendrick, of eight guns, 80 tons, and 13 men. She had been sailing from Amelia Island to Amsterdam with a cargo of pine and cotton when captured.

== Fate ==
Peacock was under Coote's command when she disappeared off the Virginia Capes. She apparently had foundered on 23 July 1814.

== See also ==
- Naval tactics in the Age of Sail
- Glossary of nautical terms (A-L)
- Glossary of nautical terms (M-Z)
- List of ships captured in the 19th century
- List of sailing frigates of the United States Navy
- List of sloops of war of the United States Navy
- Bibliography of early American naval history
