= John Smith (United States Navy officer) =

United States Navy officer

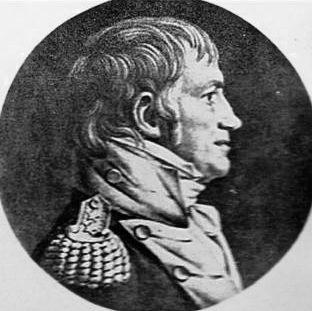
- Captain John Smith, United States Navy
- Born: January 1, 1780; England
- Died: August 6, 1815; Philadelphia, Pennsylvania, US
- Burial place: St. Peter's Church Yard in Philadelphia
- Military career
- Allegiance: United States
- Branch: United States Navy
- Service years: 1799–1815
- Rank: Captain
- Commands: USS Vixen (1803); USS Syren (1803); USS Wasp (1807); USS Essex (1799); USS Congress (1799); USS Franklin (1815)
- Conflicts: First Barbary War; War of 1812

Captain John Smith was a United States Navy officer who served in the First Barbary War and War of 1812. Over the course of his career, he commanded the warships USS Vixen, USS Syren, USS Wasp, USS Essex, USS Congress, and USS Franklin.

== Early life ==
He was born in England on 1 or 2 January 1780 as the eldest son of Rev. William Smith (not related to another Rev. William Smith). John Smith was brought by his parents to Charleston, South Carolina, at age 4, sometimes in December 1785.

== Military service ==
At age 19, on 28 February 1799, he was appointed as a lieutenant in U.S. Navy. His commission was accepted on 19 June 1799. His first assignment was on board of USS Chesapeake, beginning 12 February 1800. On 27 April he sailed on USS Chesapeake for the Mediterranean Station, and cruised off Tripoli, returning to the Washington Navy Yard on 1 June 1803 to oversee the building of USS Vixen at Baltimore, which he commanded during the First Barbary War.

=== First Barbary War ===
In August 1803, Lieutenant Smith sailed the USS Vixen from Baltimore to Gibraltar, where he joined Commodore Edward Preble's Mediterranean squadron on 14 September. He spent the remainder of the year patrolling Tripolitan waters alongside the USS Philadelphia, until the latter was captured. Smith continued his Mediterranean patrols through the first half of 1804, rejoining Commodore Rodgers' squadron in Malta in May.

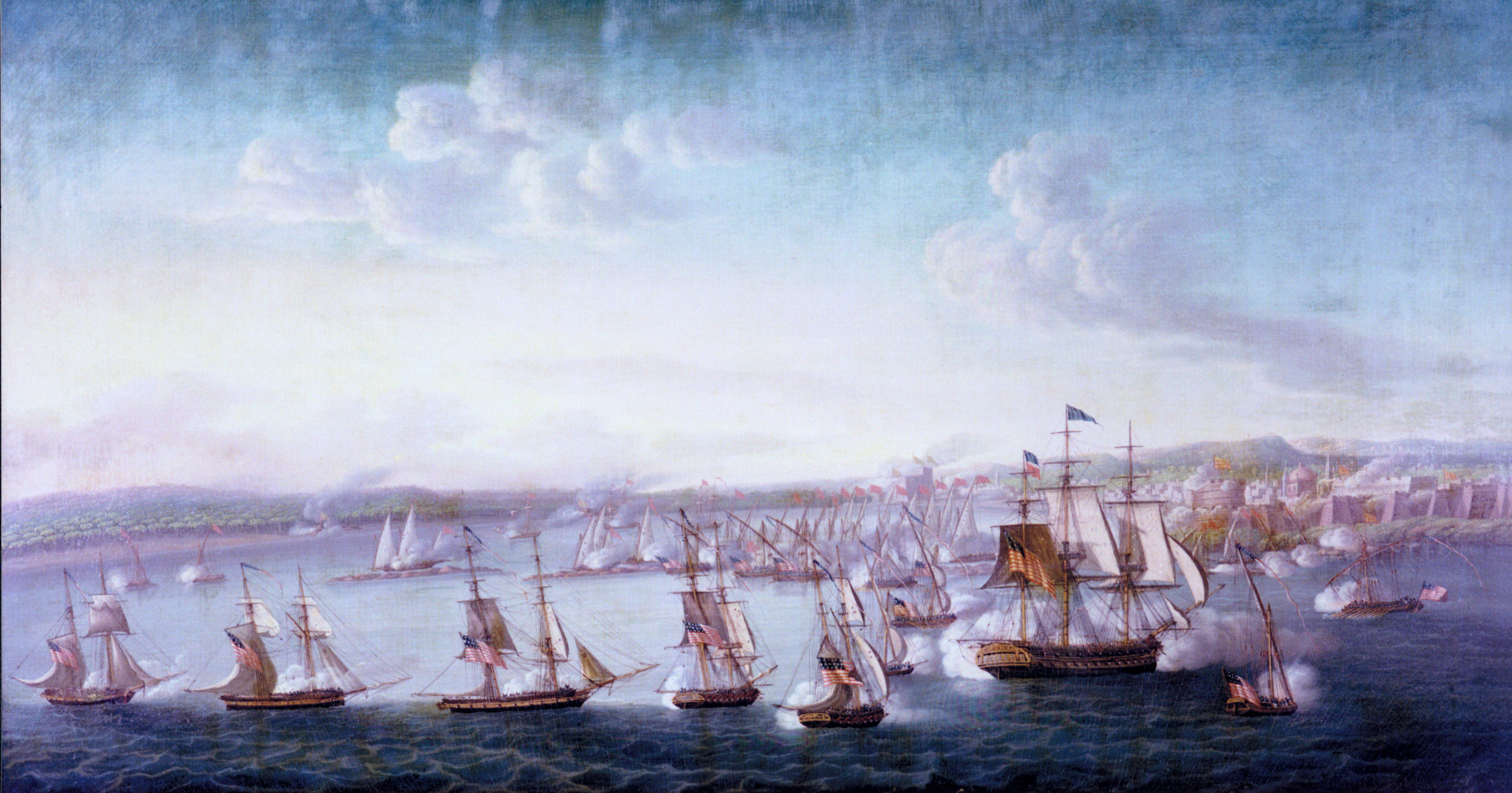
Smith commanded USS Vixen during the bombardment of Tripoli, 3 August 1804.

On 3 August 1804, Smith commanded the USS Vixen during the bombardment of Tripoli. Promoted to Master Commandant on 18 May 1804, he assumed command of the USS Syren on 3 July 1805. After the signing of a peace treaty with Tripoli on 10 June 1805, he stayed in the Mediterranean for nearly a year, working to establish and maintain favorable relations with other Barbary states. Smith returned to the United States on 28 May 1806 and was soon assigned to Washington to supervise the fitting out of the USS Wasp. As its commander, he played a crucial role in supporting Jefferson's Embargo. He delivered an army garrison from New York City to Passamaquoddy in June 1808, patrolled Casco Bay, Maine, during the winter of 1808–1809, and remained in Portland until May 1809.

Smith's next assignment was commanding the USS Essex, a post he held until his promotion to Captain on 29 October 1810.

=== War of 1812 ===
His next assignment was to USS Congress. He assumed command of her on 11 July 1811. Upon the declaration of the War of 1812 USS Congress joined the squadron of Commodore John Rodgers, and distinguished herself by capturing five British vessels as recorded by Louis F. Middlebrook in Vol. LXIII, October 1927 of Essex Institute Historical Collections:

November 1, 1812, off Western Islands, the British merchant ship Argo, 10 guns and 26 men, with a cargo of oil and whalebone, bound for London, and ordered to the United States.

May 19, 1813, in Lat. 28 N., Long. 42 W., the British brig Jean, 10 guns and 17 men, with a cargo of copper, hides, etc., bound to Greenock. After taking out the copper, the brig was burned.

May 22, 1813, in Lat. 24 N., Long. 40 W., the British brig Diana, 10 guns and 14 men, with a cargo of copper and hides bound to London, and sent into Barbadoes with the prisoners, after throwing overboard her cargo.

October 25, 1813, in Lat. 19 N., Long. 40 W., the British ship Rose, of 182 tons, crew of 12 men, with a cargo of wine and potatoes. Burned. All of her crew voluntarily enlisted in the service of the United States.

December 5, 1813, in the North Atlantic, the British brig Atlantic, crew of 12 men and a cargo of sugar and cotton from the West Indies to Cork. This brig was sent into Boston.

At the end of the war, Captain Smith was transferred to command USS Franklin, but died before or right around her launch in August 1815.

== Death ==
Captain John Smith was buried to rest in peace in St. Peter's Church Yard in Philadelphia.

The inscription on his stone, which didn't survive, read: "Sacred to the memory of JOHN SMITH ESQR. a native of South Carolina, late Post Captain in the Navy of the United States, and commander of the FRANKLIN, of 74 guns, who departed this life at Philadelphia, on the 6th day of August, 1815, Aged 35 years and 7 months, Universally lamented by all who had the happiness of knowing him. This tribute of respect for his many virtues was erected by his Affectionate Brother-in-law, Samuel Patterson, of South Carolina."
