= HMS Frolic (1806) =

Brig-sloop of the Royal Navy

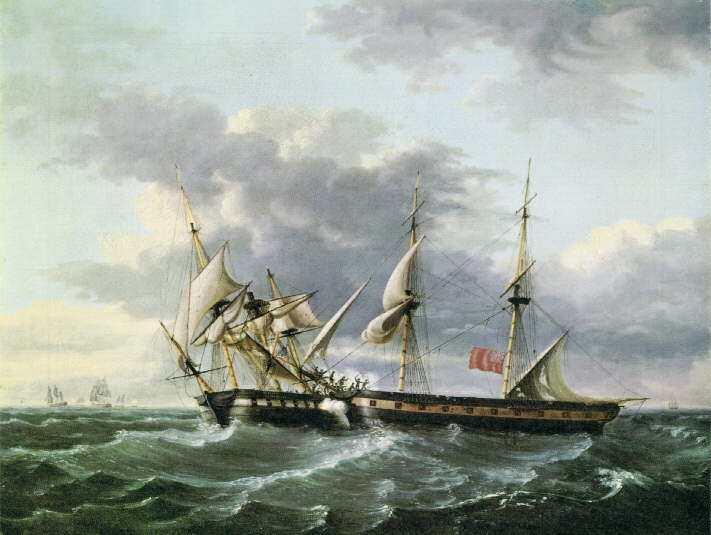
- USS Wasp boarding HMS Frolic, attributed to Thomas Birch, c. 1815

History

United Kingdom
- Builder: Boole, Bridport
- Launched: 9 February 1806
- Honours and awards: Naval General Service Medal clasps; Martinique; Guadaloupe
- Captured: 1812 (and recaptured)
- Fate: Broken up November 1813

General characteristics
- Class & type: 18-gun Cruizer-class brig-sloop
- Tons burthen: 384 (bm)
- Length: 100 ft (30.5 m) (overall); 77 ft 3 1/2 in (23.6 m) (keel)
- Beam: 30 ft 6 in (9.3 m)
- Depth of hold: 12 ft 9 in (3.9 m)
- Propulsion: Sails
- Sail plan: Brig-sloop
- Complement: 121
- Armament: 16 × 32-pounder carronades; 2 × 6-pounder chase guns

HMS Frolic was an 18-gun Cruizer-class brig-sloop of the Royal Navy. She was built by Boole, of Bridport and was launched on 9 February 1806. Although she took part in the capture of Martinique, Guadaloupe, and Saint Martin, she appears to have had an uneventful career until 8 October 1812, when the American sloop-of-war USS Wasp captured her after a fierce fight. Later that day the British recaptured Frolic and captured Wasp. Frolic was broken up in 1813.

== Career ==
On 26 October 1807, Tsar Alexander I of Russia declared war on Great Britain. The official news did not arrive there until 2 December, at which time the British declared an embargo on all Russian vessels in British ports. Frolic was one of some 70 vessels that shared in the seizure of the 44-gun Russian frigate Speshnoy (Speshnyy), then in Portsmouth harbour. The British seized the Russian storeship Wilhelmina (Vilghemina) at the same time. The Russian vessels were carrying the payroll for Vice-Admiral Dmitry Senyavin’s squadron in the Mediterranean. (Note: An able seaman on any one of the 70 British vessels received 14s 7½d in prize money.)

Frolic, under Commander Thomas Whinyates, sailed for the West Indies on 21 February 1808. (Note: For more on Thomas Whinyates see: O'Byrne, William R. (1849). "Whinyates, Thomas" . A Naval Biographical Dictionary. London: John Murray.) There she participated in the Invasion of Martinique in February 1809, and then in the invasion of Guadeloupe. (Note: A first-class share of the prize money was worth £113 3s 1¾d; a sixth-class share, that of an ordinary seaman, was worth £1 9s 5½d.) In 1847 the Admiralty authorized the issuance of the Naval General Service Medal with clasps "Martinique" and "Guadaloupe".

On 17 February 1810 Frolic, Surinam, and Superieure joined Captain William Charles Fahie of Abercrombie and his force at the surrender of Saint Martin.

On 14 June 1810, Frolic and Freya (or Freija) arrived at Sombrero Island in the West Indies. The Admiralty had sent them there to assess separately and independently the survival prospects for someone landed at this place without food and water. Captain Warwick Lake of Recruit had marooned an impressed seaman, Robert Jeffrey, there on 13 December 1807, and was now the subject of an Admiralty investigation. They reported back that survival prospects were poor. As it turned out, Jeffrey was alive, a passing American vessel having rescued him. Still, a court-martial dismissed Lake from the Royal Navy.

== Frolic vs. Wasp ==
In October 1812 the Frolic was serving on the North American station, protecting a convoy of six merchantmen off Virginia. On a passage from the Bay of Honduras, a gale dispersed the convoy and carried away Frolic's main top yard and sprung her main top mast.

On 18 October, while the convoy was reassembling and Frolic was working on the damage, a strange sail was spotted. Frolic sent the convoy on its way and hoisted a Spanish ensign as a ruse to buy time.

The strange sail turned out to be the USS Wasp, of 18 guns, commanded by Jacob Jones. The ships closed. Initially Frolic fired more rapidly but less accurately, but the gale damage had rendered her unmanageable. Within 40 minutes Wasp had repeatedly raked Frolic, killing 15 and wounding 43 out of the 120 seamen and boys aboard, including Whinyates. The Americans boarded Frolic and all resistance stopped. The Americans had 5 killed and 5 wounded.

Frolic was only temporarily in American hands. Later that day the British 74-gun Poictiers captured both ships. (Note: A first-class share of the head money for the crew of Wasp, and the prize money for certain naval stores on Wasp and Frolic was worth £64 7s; a sixth-class share was worth 5s 9¾d.) Captain John Poo Beresford of Poictiers restored Whinyates to command of Frolic. The subsequent court martial for the loss of the ship honorably acquitted Whinyates, his officers and his men.

== Fate ==
Frolic was recommissioned later in October under Lieutenant Andrew Mitchell (acting). His commission as commander was confirmed on 24 August 1813. Earlier, on 20 July 1813, Frolic was one of four British vessels sharing in the capture of the American ship Fame.

Frolic continued in service until being broken up at Portsmouth in November 1813. Her captured ensign was on display at Mahan Hall at the U.S. Naval Academy, but was removed on 27 February 2018 for preservation.

== See also ==
- List of ships captured in the 19th century
- Bibliography of 18th-19th century Royal Naval history
