= HMS Poictiers (1809) =

Vengeur-class ship of the line

- Poictiers

History

United Kingdom
- Name: HMS Poictiers
- Ordered: 1 October 1806
- Builder: King, Upnor
- Laid down: August 1807
- Launched: 9 December 1809
- Fate: Broken up, 1857

General characteristics (as built)
- Class & type: Vengeur-class ship of the line
- Tons burthen: 1,764 3/94 (bm)
- Length: 176 ft 3 in (53.7 m) (gundeck)
- Beam: 47 ft 9 in (14.6 m)
- Draught: 17 ft 5 in (5.3 m) (light)
- Depth of hold: 21 ft 1 in (6.4 m)
- Sail plan: Full-rigged ship
- Complement: 590
- Armament: 74 muzzle-loading, smoothbore guns; Gundeck: 28 × 32 pdr guns; Upper deck: 28 × 18 pdr guns; Quarterdeck: 4 × 12 pdr guns + 10 × 32 pdr carronades; Forecastle: 2 × 12 pdr guns + 2 × 32 pdr carronades

HMS Poictiers was a 74-gun Royal Navy third rate. This ship of the line was launched on 9 December 1809 at Upnor. During the War of 1812 she was part of the blockade of the United States. She was broken up in 1857.

== Active service ==
On 28 July 1810 Poictiers shared with Seine and Shannon in the recapture of the Starling. On 22 April 1811, Poictiers, Caledonia and the hired armed cutter Nimrod captured the French vessel Auguste. They removed her cargo of casks of wine and destroyed the ship.

On 24 March 1812, Poictiers was in company with Tonnant, Hogue, Colossus and Bulwark when they captured Emilie.

On 14 August Poictiers accompanied Admiral Sir John Borlase Warren, who was sailing to Halifax, Nova Scotia, on San Domingo, together with Sophie, Magnet, and Mackerel. Magnet disappeared during the voyage and was presumed foundered with all hands.

On 18 October 1812, Poictiers participated in an action where she rescued Frolic by capturing USS Wasp, commanded by Jacob Jones. Four hours after Wasp had captured Frolic, Captain Sir John Poer Beresford hove in sight and captured Wasp and recaptured Frolic. He then brought both to Bermuda. Frolic returned to duty and Wasp became HMS Loup Cervier. In November 1818 the proceeds of the sales of ordnance stores and head-money for the men captured on board Wasp, also for ordnance stores recaptured on board Frolic was paid. (Note: A first-class share was worth £64 7s; a sixth-class share, the share of an ordinary seaman, was worth 5s 9 3/4d.)

Thereafter, Poictiers captured a number of merchant vessels, alone or with other ships.

- 29 October: the brig Little William, of the Isle of Mayo and sailing to Philadelphia;
- 3 November: the brig Logan, from Boston, sailing to Baltimore;
- 25 November: the ship Rebecca, from Philadelphia and sailing to Madeira;
- 11 December: schooner Betsy, from Providence (Rhode Island), sailing to Norfolk;
- December: ship Pekin, from Boston sailing to Alexandria (Poictiers in company with Acasta).

One of these may or may not have been a ship from Brazil carrying a cargo of hides and tallow that USS Argus had captured. Poictiers recaptured the ship off the Virginia Capes in mid-December and sent her into Bermuda.

On 28 December Poictiers and Acasta captured the American letter of marque Herald, of 18 guns (10 mounted), and 50 men, as Herald was sailing from Bordeaux to Baltimore. Herald, prior to herself being captured, had taken a ship, a brig, and a schooner. The cargo of the ship Friendship alone had an estimated value of US$400,000. Poictiers was in company with Acasta and Maidstone.

More captures followed.

Poictiers took the American schooner Highflyer, of five guns and 72 men, on 9 January 1813. She was on her return from the West Indies, where she had made several captures. Under the command of Captain Jeremiah Grant, Highflyer, of Baltimore, had captured two ships, four brigs, one schooner and one sloop; three of these vessels had been armed. The Royal Navy took Highflyer into service under her existing name.

In early January 1813, the warships of the squadron blockading New York, of which Poictiers was one, captured a number of vessels:

- Schooners Syren and Tropic, sailing from New York to Charleston;
- Sloop Almira, New York to Fredericksburg;
- Brig Industry, Rhode Island to Virginia; and,
- Brig Caroline, Charleston to New York.

The British armed Syren with one gun and gave her a crew of 40 men. She then captured American Eagle, Herlitz, master, which had been sailing from Cadiz to New York.

- 17 January 1813: ship Lydia, from Rhode Islands sailing to Norfolk (Poictiers in company with Acasta and Maidstone; and,
- January: schooner Rhoda (Poictiers and Acasta).
- 24 February: American brigs Gustavus and Staunch (Poictiers shared with six other British ships);
- 24 February: American brig Hannah (Poictiers with the same six other British ships). (Note: A cargo of molasses on Hannah resulted in an award of prize money in June 1818 that amounted to £6 7s 6d for a first-class share, and 9d for a sixth-class share;)
- 13 March 1813: Swedish brig, from Martinique.
- 29 March 1813: American ship Montesquieu (Poictiers in company with Belvidera and the actual captor, the schooner Paz). (Note: A first-class share of the ransom was worth £1704 9s 5d; a sixth-class share was worth £7 14s 10d. For an ordinary seaman, the amount was worth about four to five months' pay. For a captain, the first-class share was worth more than four or five years' pay. This payment represented money reserved to answer Paz's claims before the Vice-Court of Admiralty at Halifax. Lieutenant Perry Dumaresque, captain of Paz, had objected to Montesquieu being ransomed rather than sold as a prize.)
- 17 April: Portuguese schooner Alliance, sailing from Philadelphia to Jamaica with a cargo of flour, and sent in to Bermuda;
- 28 April: English schooner Bermuda recaptured while sailing from Bermuda to Philadelphia, and used as a tender to Poictiers;
- 1 May: American sloop Providence sailing from Philadelphia to Boston with a cargo of flour and corn, and sent in to Bermuda; and
- 10 May: American sloop Factor sailing from Philadelphia to Boston with a cargo of cotton, cargo removed and vessel set adrift.

Poictiers was part of a squadron of 12 ships that shared in the capture on 13 and 14 March of Christina and Massatoit.

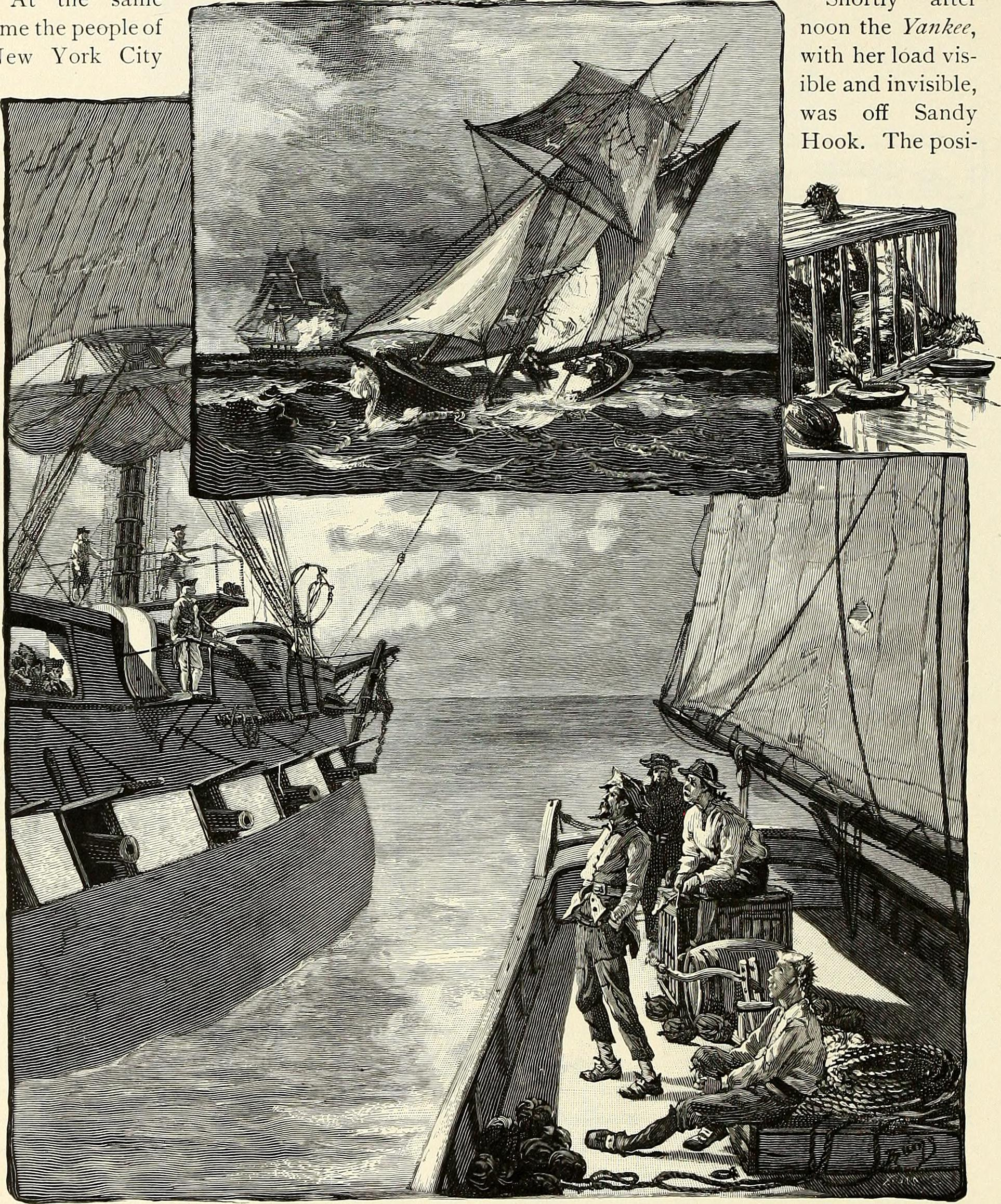
Poictiers fired a few ineffectual shots. The position of the channel made it necessary for Yankee to pass close to Poictiers

On 4 (or 5) July 1813 the American smack Yankee captured the brig Eagle, which was serving as a tender to Poictiers. The Americans put 40 militiamen on board Yankee and sailed her where Eagle was known to be patrolling. The militiamen concealed themselves while on Yankee's deck there were three men dressed as fishermen, and a calf, a goose, and a sheep were tethered. When Yankee encountered Eagle, Eagle fell for the bait of fresh meat and came alongside. The Americans, under Sailing-Master Percival, came out of hiding and fired their small arms. Although Eagle carried a brass 32-pounder howitzer loaded with canister, she was unable to get off a shot. The Americans then took Eagle into New York. Eagle had two men killed, including her commander Master's Mate H. Morris, and Midshipman W. Price mortally wounded. The remaining eight seamen were taken prisoner. (Note: The British recaptured Eagle in September 1813 (though under what name and by whom is unclear), and renamed her HMS Chubb. She was sold in 1822.)

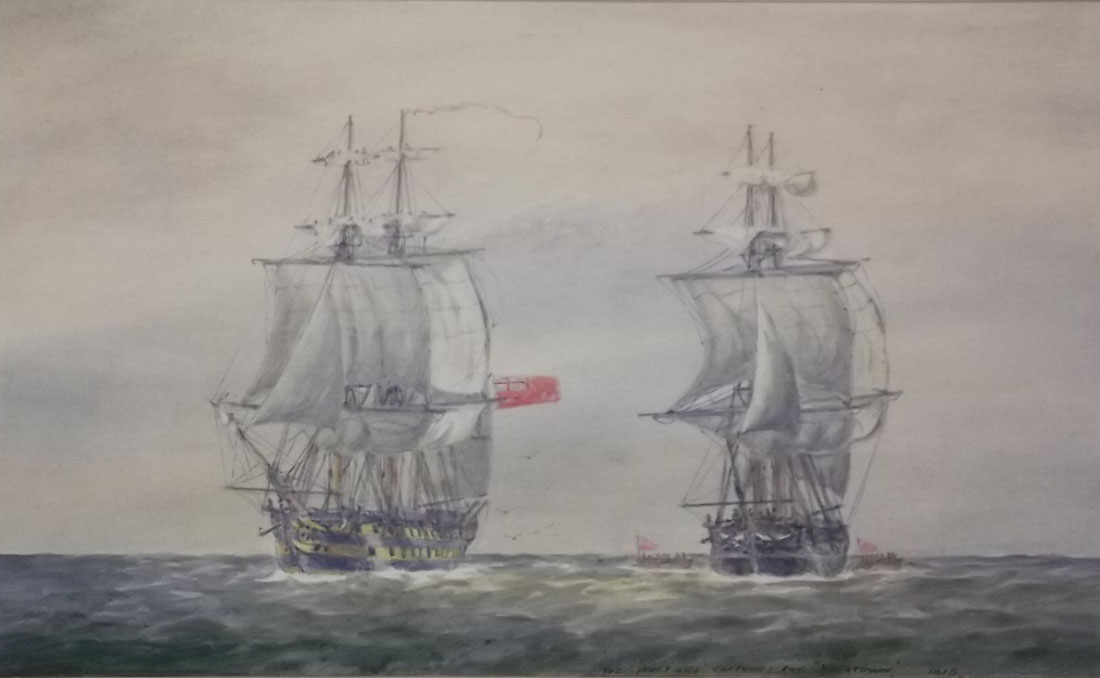
Poictiers captures 'Yorktown', 1813, by Irwin John Bevan

Poictiers, with Poictiers and Maidstone in company, captured Yorktown, of 20 guns and 140 men, on 17 July. Yorktown, under Captain T. W. Story, had taken 11 prizes, including Manchester, before Maidstone captured Yorktown after a four-hour chase. The British sent Yorktown and her crew into Halifax, Nova Scotia. (Note: The Halifax Vie-admiralty records give the name of York Ton's master as A. Ricker.) (Note: The head-money and final payment of hull and stores of Herald and Highflyer amounted to £52 6s 4d for a first-class share. A sixth-class share was worth 5s 3d.)

Poictiers in company with Maidstone and Nimrod captured several vessels.

- 13 August 1813: brig Anna, of 125 tons, Diego Martinez, master, sailing from Newhaven to Laguira. (Note: A first-class share of the prize money was worth £129 6 1/4d; a sixth-class share was worth £1 7d.)
- 18 August: ship Manchester.

Poictiers alone captured:

- 29 August: brig Mariner; and
- 3 September: brig Watson.

These incidents aside, Poictiers had an uneventful war, though there is a record of one humorous incident. The exhibit center of the town of Lewes, Delaware, has a framed copy of a handwritten letter from Captain Beresford to the town's chief magistrate. Dated 16 March 1813, the letter says:

Sir,

As soon as you receive this, I request you will send 20 live bullocks with a proportionate quantity of vegetables and hay to the Poictiers for the use of Britannic Majesty's squadron now at this anchorage, which will be immediately paid for at the Philadelphia prices. If you refuse to comply with this request I shall be under necessity of destroying your town. I have the honor to be, sir, your very obedient servant,

J. P. Beresford

Commodore and commander of the British Squadron in the Mouth of the Delaware.

Col. Samuel Boyer Davis, commander of American troops in Lewes, refused the demand, so on 6 and 7 April Beresford shelled the town, killing a chicken and wounding a pig. There is a cannonball from Poictiers lodged in the stone foundation of Lewes's Marine Museum.

In November 1813 Poictiers was at Halifax, Nova Scotia, preparing to escort a convoy of merchant vessels to England when a gale hit the city. It destroyed or damaged many vessels, though Poictiers was able to ride out the gale.

Poictiers was at Chatham in 1814.

== Post war and Fate ==
Poictiers underwent a "Large Repair" at Chatham between April 1815 September 1817. She was fitted at Sheerness as a guard ship between March 1836 and September 1837. She remained in that role at Chatham until March 1848 when she became a depot ship until 1850. In 1857 she was sold out of service and broken up, the breaking up being completed on 23 March 1857.
