= Battle of Derna (1805) =

Part of the First Barbary War

- Part of the First Barbary War
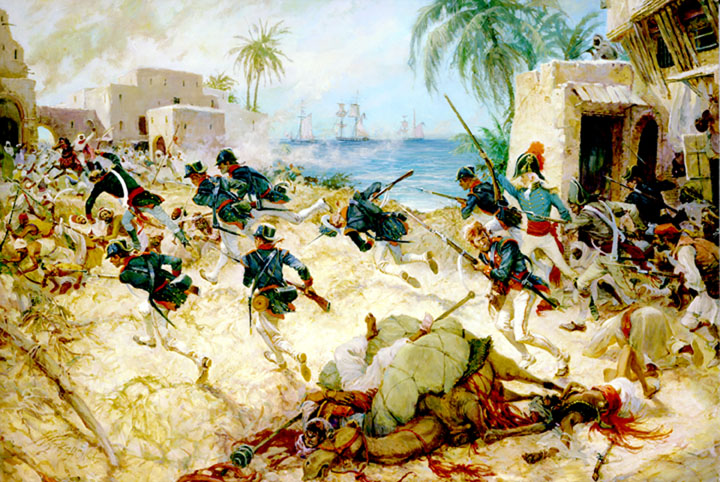
- William Eaton leading the attack on Derna
Date	April 27 – June 12 1805
Location	Derna, Cyrenaica, Regency of Tripoli 32°46′N 22°38′E
Result	American victory

Belligerents
United States (Ottoman Tripolitania) Tripolitanian rebels	Tripolitania

Commanders and leaders
(United States) William Eaton (WIA) (United States) Presley O'Bannon (United States) Oliver Perry (Ottoman Tripolitania) Hamet Karamanli	(Ottoman Tripolitania) Mustafa Bey (Ottoman Tripolitania) Hassan Bey

Strength
9 U.S. Marines; 3 navymen 70 Greek mercenaries 450 Arabs; 1 sloop 1 brig 1 schooner	Garrison: 800 men Relief force: 1,200 men

Casualties and losses
Americans: 2 killed 3 wounded Greeks: 10 wounded Arabs: 68–78 killed and wounded	68–78 killed 120 wounded

The Battle of Derna at Derna, Cyrenaica, was a military engagement in April–May 1805 of a mercenary army recruited and led by United States Marines under the command of William Eaton, diplomatic Consul to Tripoli, and U.S. Marine Corps First Lieutenant Presley O'Bannon. The battle involved a 521-mile (839-km) march through the Libyan Desert from Alexandria, Egypt, to the eastern port city of Derna, which was defended by a much larger force.

The Battle of Derna and the broader First Barbary War highlighted the challenges faced by the United States in dealing with piracy and asserting its interests in the Mediterranean during the early years of its existence as a nation. It was also the first foreign military intervention in U.S. history.

== Background ==
In 1804, the former consul to Tunis, William Eaton, returned to the Mediterranean Sea with the title of Naval Agent to the Barbary States. Eaton had been granted permission from the United States government and President Thomas Jefferson to back the claim of Hamet Karamanli, the rightful heir to the throne of Tripoli. Hamet had been deposed by his younger brother Yusuf Karamanli, who had assassinated their older brother by shooting him in front of their mother. Hamet was out of the country at the time and decided to remain in exile. Upon his return to the area, Eaton sought out Hamet, who was in exile in Egypt. Hamet agreed to Eaton's proposal to restore him to the throne.

Commodore Samuel Barron, the naval commander in the Mediterranean Sea, provided Eaton with naval support from several small warships of the United States Navy's Mediterranean squadron: USS Nautilus, commanded by Oliver Hazard Perry, USS Hornet, under Samuel Evans, and USS Argus, captained by Isaac Hull. The three vessels were to provide offshore bombardment support. Eaton was given a small detachment of seven United States Marines, commanded by First Lieutenant Presley O'Bannon. Eaton and O'Bannon based their operations at Alexandria, Egypt. With the help of Hamet Karamanli, they recruited about 400 Arab and Greek mercenaries. Eaton appointed himself general and commander-in-chief of the force.

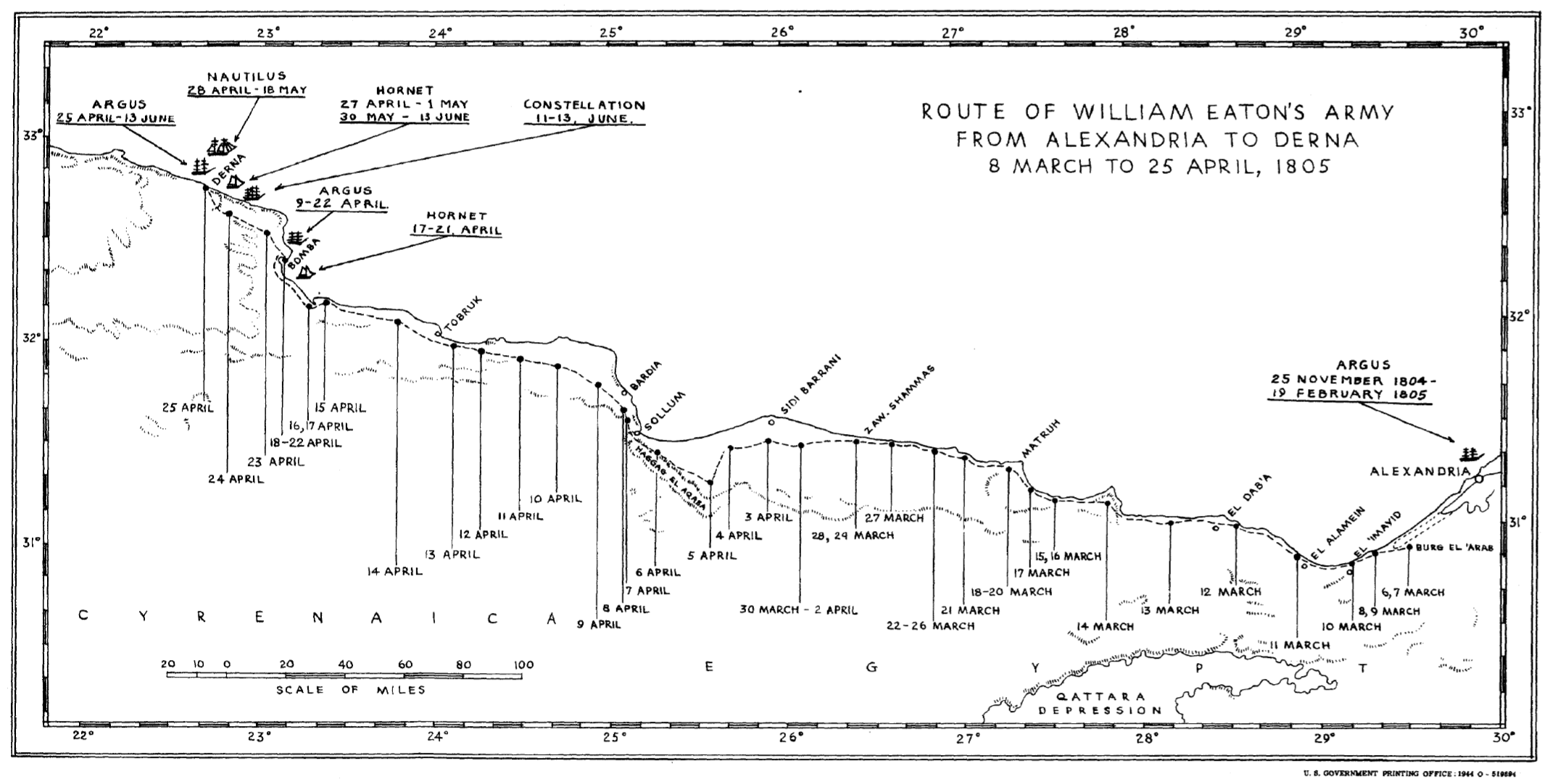
Lieutenant Eaton's army route to Derna 8 March – 25 April 1805.

On 8 March 1805, Eaton led his forces on a 500 miles (800 km) trek westward across the Libyan Desert from Egypt. Their objective was the port city of Derna, the capital of the Ottoman province of Cyrenaica. The mercenary force was promised supplies and money when it reached the city. During the 50-day trek, Eaton became worried over the strained relationship between the Christian Greeks and the roughly 200 to 300 Muslim Arab and Turkish mercenaries. The expedition's supplies dwindled, with Eaton reporting in 1805, "Our only provisions [are] a handful of rice and two biscuits a day." At one point, some of the Arabs in the expedition made a desperate attempt to raid the supply wagon but were beaten back by the Marines and a few Greek artillerymen, who used the expedition's lone cannon. Mutiny threatened the expedition on several occasions. Between 10 and 18 March, several Arab camel drivers mutinied before they reached the sanctuary of Massouah Castle. From 22 to 30 March, several Arab mercenaries, under the command of Sheik el Tahib, staged mutinies.

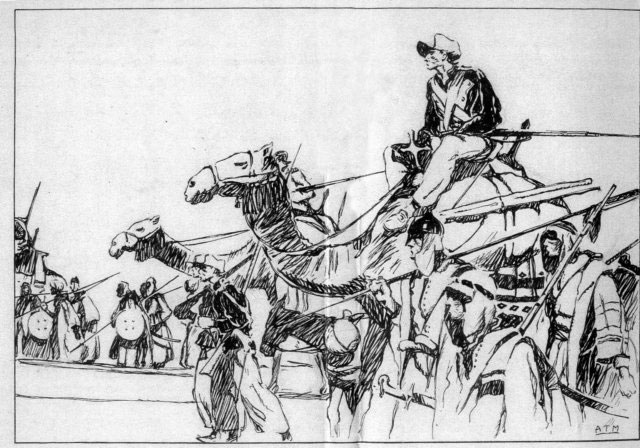
Presley O'Bannon, on the way to Derna, 1805

By 8 April, when Eaton crossed into Tripoli, he had quelled the Arab mutinies. In late April, his force reached the port city of Bomba on the Gulf of Bomba, some miles up the coast from Derna, where the warships Argus, Nautilus, and Hornet were waiting for him. Eaton received fresh supplies and the money to pay his mercenaries.

== Battle ==
=== Capture of Derna ===
On 26 April, the mercenary army arrived at Derna. Several sheikhs from the city came to Hamet and declared their loyalty to him. The city was reconnoitered, and information was obtained. The city was defended by 800 men, and nearby was a Tripolitan army. On the same day, Eaton offered the bey of Derna, Mustafa Bey, peace conditions in exchange for loyalty to Hamet. Mustapha Bey replied, "My head or yours." After the warships dropped two field pieces, Eaton and Hamet launched their attack the next day. On 27 April the Tripolitans began firing at the US ships, and in response, they opened fire on the town. O'Bannon led the Marines, Greek mercenaries, and the cannoniers. Hamet's cavalry force managed to occupy the old castle southwest of the city. 45 minutes later, the US ships managed to neutralize the city batteries. The Tripolitans abandoned their site and reinforced the position that O'Bannon was attacking.

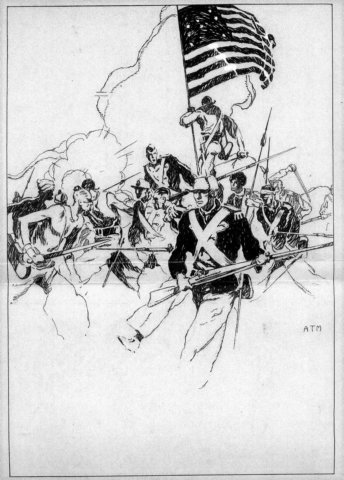
Battle of Derna 1805

The Tripolitans showed heavy musket fire. The field pieces were slow, and Eaton was desperate; he ordered a charge against the enemy. The Tripolitans began retreating. Eaton was shot in his left wrist. The Tripolitans were firing from houses and trees while fleeing. The Marines and the Greeks charged towards the battery while sustaining heavy fire from the houses. The battery was captured, and an American flag was planted on the wall. The Americans began using the batteries to bomb the houses to dislodge the Tripolitans there. Mustapha Bey fled from his palace, which was taken by Hamet's forces. Hamet's cavalry flanked the retreating Tripolitans, and by 4:00 PM, the city was under the Allies' control. Eaton and 10 Greeks were wounded. Marine Private John Wilton was killed in the assault, with Corporals David Thomas and Bernard O’Brian wounded. Another Marine, Edward Stewart, died of his wounds 3 days later.

=== Tripolitanian assaults ===
Tripolitanian reinforcements numbering 1,200 men led by Hassan Bey arrived in Tripoli on 8 May. They began taking position where the Americans had launched their attack. On 13 May the Tripolitans launched their attack against the city. The Tripolitans attacked an outpost a mile from the town garrisoned by 100 Hamet's cavalry. Initially they resisted being forced to abandon their post and retreat to the town. The Tripolitans pursued them until they entered the town all the way to the palace. Eaton feared that the day was lost and his forces were too few in number to do anything. A shot from the ship killed 2 Tripolitans and forced the rest to retreat. Chased by Hamet's cavalry, the Tripolitans suffered 28 killed and 50 wounded. Hamet's cavalry lost 14 killed and wounded.

On 28 May the Tripolitans dispatched a force of 50-60 men on a foraging expedition and attacked a party of Arabs but were repelled. On 10 June the Tripolitans launched an all-out assault against the city. Hamet's cavalry once again resisted the Tripolitans in a battle that lasted for 4 hours; the American guns gave some assistance to Hamet. The Tripolitans were repelled with a loss of 40-50 killed and 70 wounded, while Hamet's troops lost 50-60 killed and wounded. O'Bannon wished to lead out his troops and take an active part in the fight, but Eaton was unwilling to leave the defenses unmanned.

=== US Evacuation of Derna ===
On 11 June USS Constellation arrived in the city and informed Eaton that a peace treaty was signed and ordered him to evacuate Derna immediately. This was a bitter disappointment for Eaton, who had hoped to march on to Tripoli and end the war by toppling Yusuf Karamanli. Fearing massacre by the Arab troops and the locals if they learned of the retreat, Eaton’s men staged a fake attack preparation on the Tripolitans on 12 June to distract them. The evacuation was carried out secretly at night. First the cannoneers and Greeks left with the captured artillery. Next, Hamet left then the Marines and officers, and lastly Eaton in a small boat. As soon as Eaton’s men were gone, the locals and Arabs fled to the mountains, fearing Yusuf’s reprisals. A messenger arrived with Yusuf’s offer of amnesty, which many did not trust, preparing to defend themselves instead. However, Yusuf honored his word, and no massacre took place in the city.

== Aftermath ==
The Battle of Derna was the first land battle of the United States on foreign soil after the American Revolutionary War. Despite the initial capture of the city, the allies had to face a siege imposed by the Tripolitans, which delayed their advance to Tripoli until a peace treaty was signed. A peace treaty was signed between Yusuf Karamanli and Tobias Lear, which treaty states abandoning Derna and not supporting Hamet Karamanli to be the legitimate ruler of Tripoli. The pasha agreed in return to release Ahmad's wife and children, whom he was holding hostage. The treaty also provided for an exchange of prisoners, primarily of the 297-man crew of the USS Philadelphia in exchange for 89 prisoners held by the U.S., and a $60,000 ransom payment by the U.S.

Eaton returned to the United States as a national hero. Legend holds that O'Bannon was presented a Mameluke sword by Hamet, the Ottoman Empire viceroy. The first mention of Hamet giving O'Bannon a bejeweled sword seems to be in a lengthy article, "Kentucky Officer First to Carry Stars and Stripes to Victory in Foreign Country," by John Presley Cain in the 29 July 1917 edition of the Louisville Courier-Journal. One sword that was purported to be the sword in question turned out to be a late-Victorian era forgery. O'Bannon was later awarded a sword of honor by his home state of Virginia. A further legend holds that O'Bannon's exploits in North Africa inspired the Marine Corps officers to adopt Mameluke swords, but that is also uncorroborated by any contemporaneous sources. Swords of the style were very popular in Europe, and a more likely scenario is that the Marines imitated the influential military leaders who were wearing them.

== Legacy ==
The attack on Derna was the inspiration for the lyrics of the Marines' Hymn in the line "to the shores of Tripoli." In 1850, the American poet John Greenleaf Whittier wrote the poem "Derne" to commemorate this battle. The USS O'Bannon (DD-450), the Fletcher-class destroyer that was the US Navy's most decorated destroyer during World War II, was named in honor of First Lieutenant O'Bannon.
