= Gulf of Bomba =

Body of water in the Mediterranean Sea on the northern coast of Libya

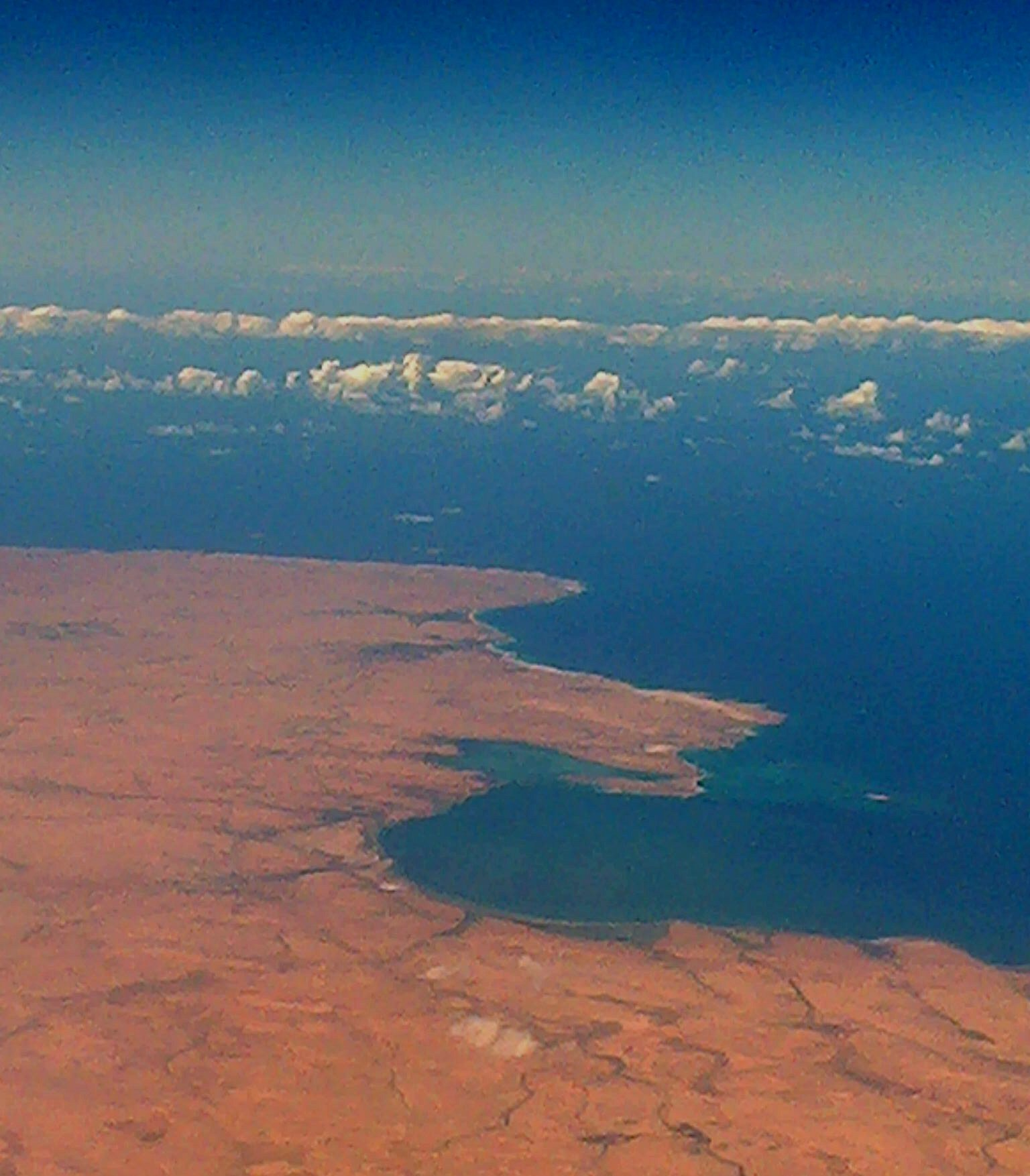
- Aerial photo of Gulf of Bomba.
- Interactive map of Gulf of Bomba
- Location: Mediterranean Sea
- Coordinates: 32°38′00″N 023°07′00″E
- Basin countries: Libya

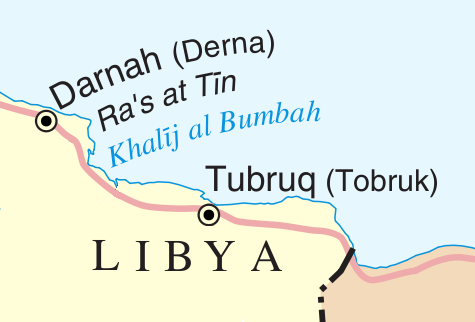
The Gulf of Bomba lies on the coast of Libya between Derna and Tobruk.

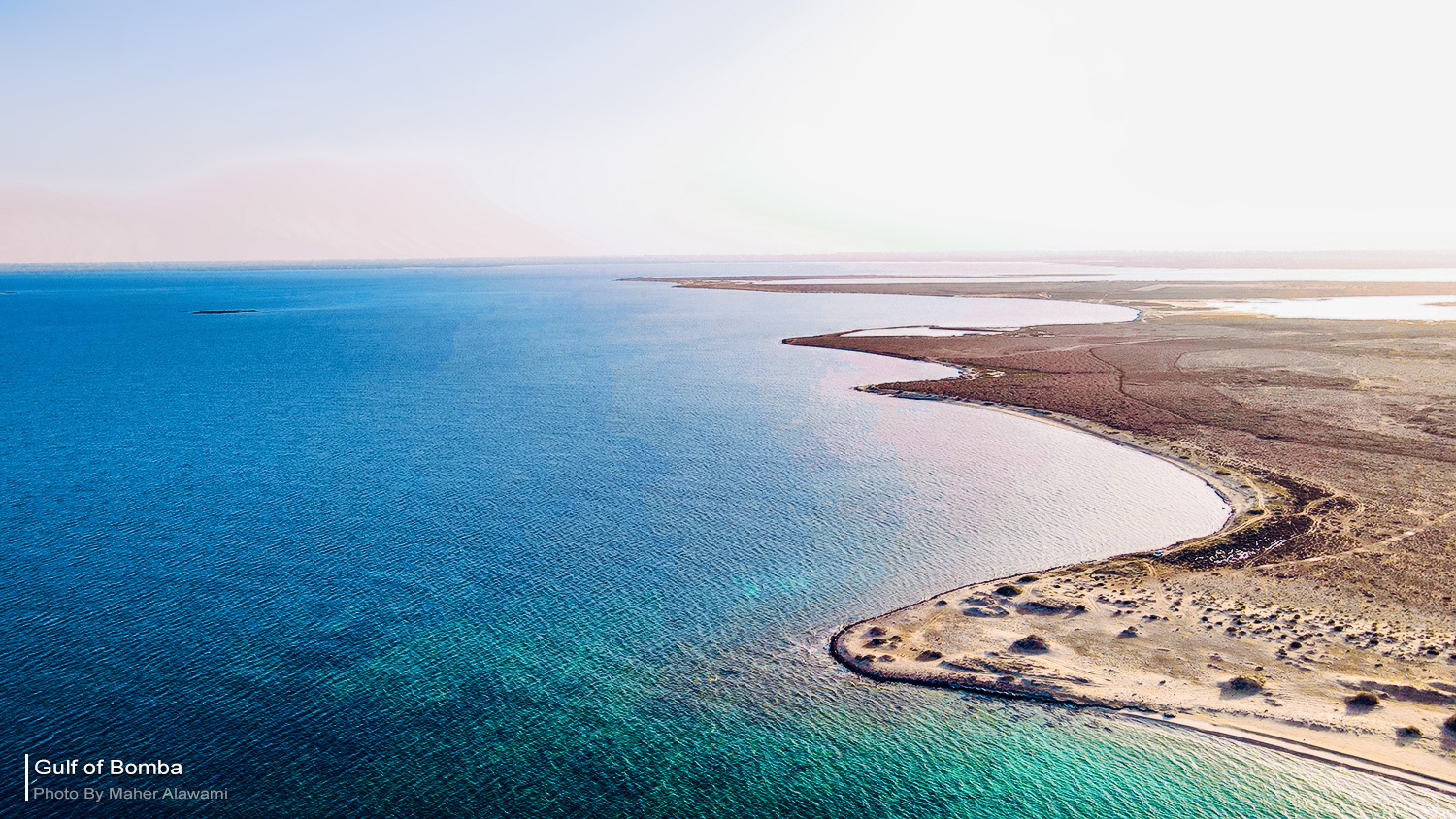
A view of G. of Bomba, and Fteiha island.

The Gulf of Bomba, is a body of water in the Mediterranean Sea on the northern coast of Libya. It lies about 40 miles (64 km) east of Derna (or Derne) at 32 degrees 38 minutes North Latitude, 23 degrees 07 minutes East Longitude. It is named after the Libyan village of Bomba.

== The Barbary War ==
During the First Barbary War, the United States Navy brig USS Argus, commanded by Lieutenant Isaac Hull, brought food and supplies to the Gulf of Bomba on 16 April 1805 for a ground force commanded by Consul William Eaton. Eaton's force, consisting of himself, eight United States Marines, and a group of mainly Arab allies, traveled more than 500 miles (805 km) from Egypt to attack the state of Tripoli, which was holding as hostages and slaves about 300 Americans from the U.S. Navy frigate USS Philadelphia captured when Philadelphia had run aground in Tripoli Harbor in October 1803. The supplies received from Argus enabled Eaton's force to win the Battle of Derna – which began on 27 April 1805 – and take control of Derna, the largest city in what was then eastern Tripoli.

== World War II ==
Three aircraft of B24 NAS (Naval Air Squadron) flying from the RAF airfield at Maarten Bagush sunk the depot ship Monte Gargano, two submarines and a destroyer as they prepared to launch a Chariot human torpedo raid on shipping in Alexandria. All six aircrew were decorated 1 x DSO, 4 X DSC and 1 X DSM.
