= Samuel Evans (naval officer) =

US Navy officer (died 1824

Samuel Evans (died 2 June 1824) was a long-serving officer in the United States Navy. Evans served with distinction during Quasi-War with France, the First Barbary War and the War of 1812. He later served as the commandant of the New York Navy Yard from 1813 until his death in 1824.

== Early Service ==
Evans was born in New Jersey, date and place of birth are unknown. Evans was first appointed as a midshipman, 11 May 1798. he later advanced to the rank of lieutenant, on 25 November 1799 and to master commandant (commander)on 24 April 1806, he attained the rank of captain on 4 July 1812. While a midshipman, he served on the USS Ganges. While serving on the Ganges he sailed from Philadelphia 24 May 1798, under the command of Captain Richard Dale, and cruised on the Atlantic coast in the early part of the Quasi-War with France (1798-1800). Evans in 1799 was ordered to the USS George Washington, which was attached to the squadron of Commodore Thomas Tingey on the Guadaloupe Station. In 1801 he again served with the USS George Washington. On 2 June 1801 he was informed that he was one of the Lieutenants selected to be retained in the Navy under the Military Peace Establishment Act of 3 March 1801, where he took part in naval actions against the Barbary pirates, the George Washington carried tribute to Algiers in the summer of 1801, and remained in the Mediterranean on convoy duty for several months during the first part of the War with Tripoli (1801-1805), sailing for home early in 1802. On 27 August 1802 Evans was ordered to Washington DC and on 6 September 1802 to the USS John Adams. In September 1802 Evans again sailed for the Mediterranean aboard the USS John Adams under the command of Captain John Rodgers.

== Barbary War ==
Evans served in the squadron of Commodore John Rodgers in the Mediterranean during the latter part of the War with Tripoli; where he transferred from the USS Congress to the USS Constitution 9 November 1804; commanded the USS Hornet. On 21 March 1805, Evans established a reputation for courage in the capture of the town of Derna Libya. Captain Isaac Hull wrote "Lieutenant Evans anchored ... within one hundred yards of the battery of eight guns and commenced heavy fire upon it, ... the fort of [Derna] kept up a heavy fire for about an hour, after which the shot was flying so thick about them they abandoned it and ran into the town." On 27 April 1805; he assumed command of the USS Nautilus.

On 16 August 1806 Evans requested permission to be furloughed to make a merchant voyage in the ship Warren of Baltimore. Permission was granted the same day, and he was ordered to report to the Navy Department on his return. Evans reported his arrival at Philadelphia on 17 February 1808 in a lengthy report of the 18th, in which he described the events of the voyage and the loss of the merchant ship Warren, which was taken possession of at Talcahuano, Chile, by the Spanish authorities in January 1807. Evans spent much of the year 1808 overseeing the building of naval gunboats in Baltimore, Maryland. On 27 February 1809 he ordered to New York to assume command of the USS Argus; detached from the Argus 21 March 1809 and subsequently ordered to Washington to assume command of the USS John Adams. On 20 November 1809 he was ordered to prepare the John Adams, then at New York City, immediately for foreign service. Evans sailed from New York on 15 December 1809 bearing dispatches from the State Department to France and England and then to transport specie from the Treasury Department to Holland.

On 3 April 1811 Evans was again furloughed for a merchant voyage by his own request, but was unable to go, as he was on 13 May 1812 ordered to take command of the Norfolk Navy Yard.

== War of 1812 ==
In Norfolk Navy Yard Evans concentrated on fitting out and manning gunboats and the overall readiness of the shipyard. In his letter to Secretary of the Navy Paul Hamilton dated 24 June 1812, Evans complained "I regret that I have to state there is now scarcely a possibility to procure a seaman here. It is said there is not more than twenty in Norfolk." In August 1812 Evans was ordered from Norfolk to Boston to assume command of the USS Chesapeake and prepare her for service. On 28 November 1812 he was ordered to join Captain Stephen Decatur, to whose squadron he was attached. He sailed from Boston 13 December and made a short cruise in the North Atlantic, to enforce the embargo against Britain. During this voyage Evans captured five vessels, and recaptured an American Schooner and "between 40 and 50 prisoners' after which he returned to Boston in April 1813. Samuel Evans while captain of the USS Chesapeake "had the good luck to capture five merchant vessels" his share of the prize money for their capture came to $10,290.00

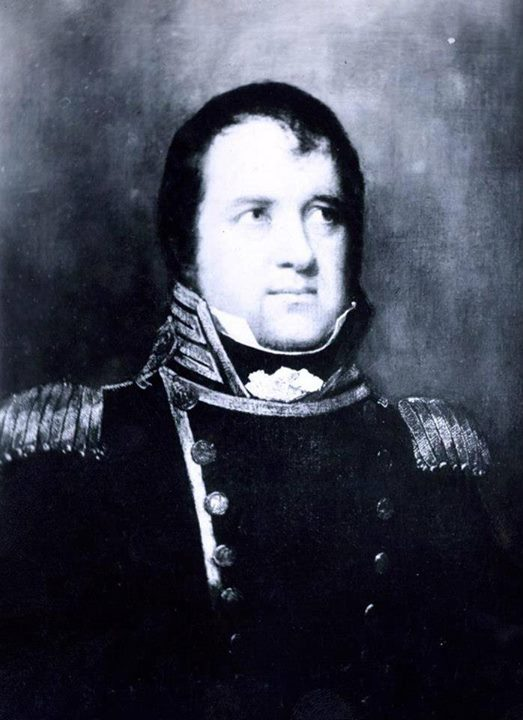
Painting of Captain Samuel Evans while he was commandant Norfolk Navy Yard

== Brooklyn Navy Yard ==
On 30 April 1813 Evans asked to be relieved of the command of the USS Chesapeake, stating his "eyesight was affected as the result of an old wound, and he must be under the care of an oculist." On 6 May the Secretary of the Navy Paul Hamilton replied to his letter, releasing him from his command of the Chesapeake, and ordering him to take command of the Navy Yard at New York. Hamilton wrote the new assignment would "afford him a convenient situation while his health was restored" and that "the service could but not dispense with him" and that at the New York Yard, then vacant, 'the services of a judicious, active, prudent and economical officer were extraordinarily wanted.'

One significant achievement for navy yard during the Evans years was the construction and launch in May 1820 of the 74 gun ship of the line USS Ohio, the first ship built at Brooklyn Navy Yard. Samuel Evans tenure at the navy yard though was beset by problems. One of the most difficult challenges was economic, the Panic of 1819. In response to this economic downturn President James Monroe and to ensure financial stability made large cuts to the annual naval appropriation and as a consequence Evans was ordered to reduce the wages of all navy yard mechanics and laborers across the board. These wage reductions were dramatic and highly unpopular. For example, on 24 May 1820 the Board of Navy Commissioners directed Evans that ship carpenters wages were to be reduced from $1.62.5 per day to $1.25 per day and laborers wages reduced from 90 cents per day to 75 cents per day 24 May 1820 This order was followed by yet further reductions in both wages and hours of work. Evans, in distress, on 10 December 1821 wrote to the Board "all the Carpenters employed excepting five, and all the Blacksmiths excepting two, have left off work this morning." Similarly in December 1821 the size of the navy yard workforce was restricted to just 151 employees.

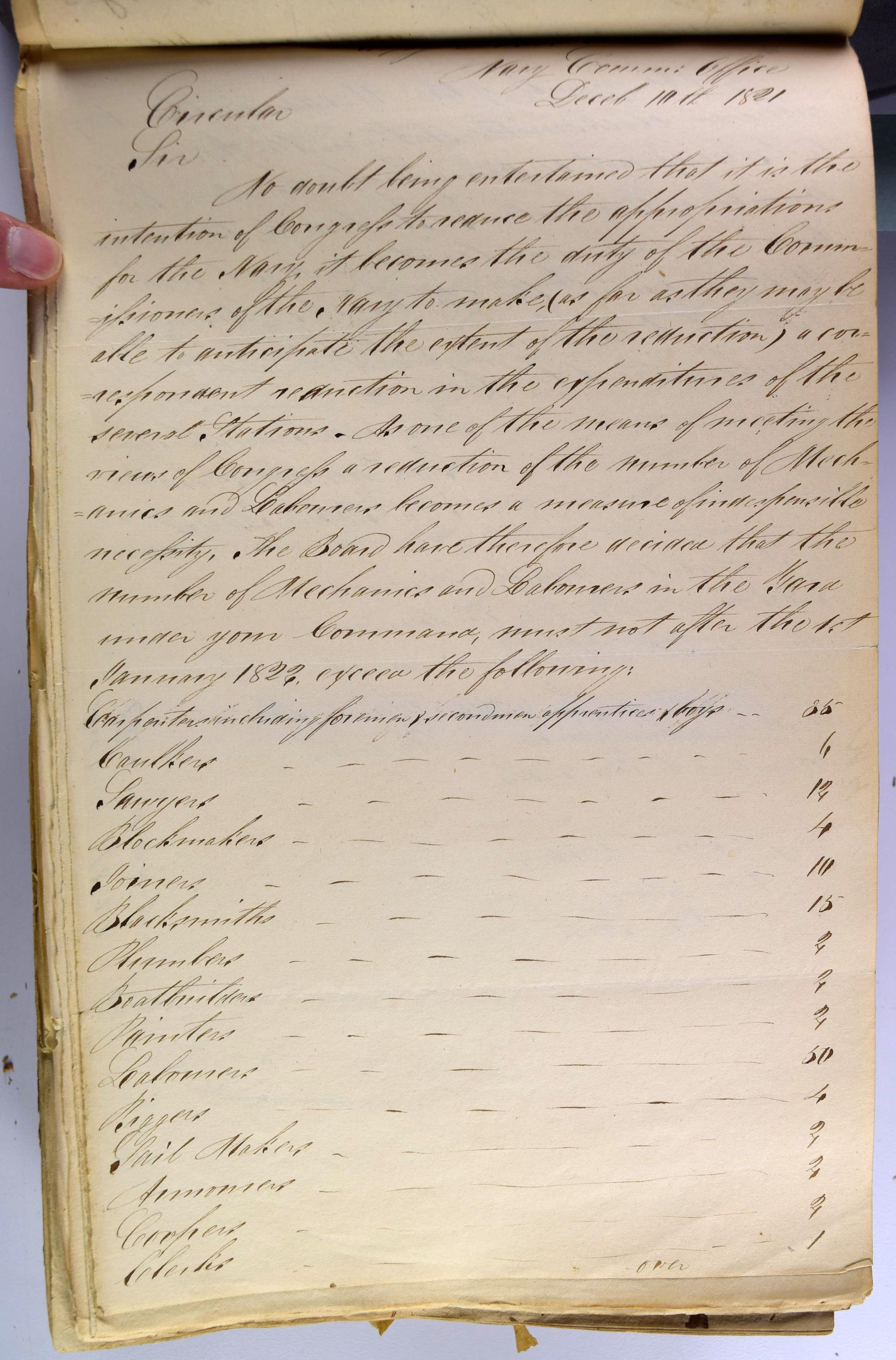
John Rodgers to Samuel Evans Dec 10 1821 re employee limit 151 for Brooklyn Navy Yard

== Naval Court of Inquiry ==
On 27 March 1823 the New York Evening Post announced a Naval Court of Inquiry to be held at the Navy Yard, Brooklyn, by order of the Secretary of the Navy, "to investigate the conduct of Captain Evans, as commandant of the yard upon charges preferred by John Pine Decatur, naval storekeeper". The Evans Inquiry began in July 1823. Most of the testimony heard by the court came from civilian employees. The charges detailed numerous alleged diversions of public stores and materials. The Evans Inquiry received wide dissemination in the national press. The charges included, the selling of government-owned supplies and fittings to private shipping interests, the use of government-owned small boats to operate a ferry service for Evans's personal gain, the building of a ferry service for Evans's private gain and the building of a ferry boat for Evans's private use with government labor and materials and the diversion of Navy Yard lumber and workmen to build additions to Evans's home. The Inquiry convicted Evans of and recommended he be officially reprimanded by the Secretary of the Navy. Evidence was offered that Captain Evans "On 1 December 1817 ...had been granted the right to establish and operate a ferry between Walnut Street New York, and Little Street Long Island, on the West Side, adjacent to the Navy Yard; for a term of fifteen years for the accommodation of mechanics and others in crossing. No rent was charged for the first seven years..." Reports of the Evans Inquiry were widely carried in local and national newspapers of the era. Evans was admonished by the court for "blending public and private concerns" and sentenced to receive a reprimand from the Secretary of the Navy. In his private correspondence, Commodore Isaac Hull, wrote, Evans was thought to be suffering a "derangement." Secretary of the Navy Smith Thompson possibly with Evans mental state in mind, reduced the recommended reprimand to a written warning in which he rebuked Evans "for want of due care.". The Evans Inquiry and testimony deeply divided the navy yard workforce for the next decade.

== Death ==
Captain Samuel Evans remained in command of the New York Navy Yard Brooklyn Navy Yard until his death, which occurred at the navy yard as he boarded the gangway of the USS Constitution, on 2 June 1824, from a ruptured blood vessel while going up the gangway of the frigate.
