= William Eaton (soldier) =

American military officer and diplomat

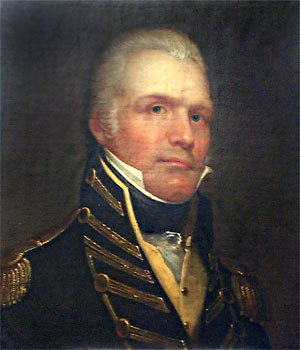
- Eaton c. 1807
- Born: February 23, 1764; Woodstock, Connecticut, British America
- Died: June 1, 1811 (aged 47); Brimfield, Massachusetts, U.S.
- Military career
- Allegiance: United States
- Branch: Continental Army; United States Army
- Service years: 1780–1783; 1792–1797; 1799–1803 (Consul to Tunis)
- Rank: Captain (U.S. Army) Navy Agent (Civilian Commission) Consul General (Diplomatic Rank)
- Conflicts: First Barbary War; Battle of Derne

William Eaton (23 February 1764 – 1 June 1811) was a United States Army officer and the diplomatic officer Consul General to Tunis (1797–1803). He played an important diplomatic and military role in the First Barbary War between the United States and Tripoli (1801–1805). He led the first foreign United States military victory at the Battle of Derne by capturing the Tripoli subject city of Derne in support of the restoration of the pasha (local monarch), Hamet Karamanli. He also gave testimony at the treason trial of former Vice President Aaron Burr. Eaton served one term in the General Court of Massachusetts, which is the state legislature both during and after the colonial era. Eaton died on June 1, 1811, at the age of 47.

== Early life ==
William Eaton was born in Woodstock, Connecticut. He was one of thirteen children of Nathaniel and Sarah (née Johnson) Eaton. His father was a middle class farmer, who worked as a school teacher in the winter, "an employment for which he is represented as having been well qualified by more than ordinary means for a farmer". When he was ten years old, William's family moved to Mansfield, Connecticut.

== Military career ==
Eaton ran away at the age of sixteen to enlist in the army. He joined the Continental Army in 1780 and served until 1783, attaining the rank of sergeant at the age of 19. He earned money for college working as a school teacher in Windsor, Vermont. In 1790, he graduated from Dartmouth College. He and a classmate presented a poetic dialogue at the commencement. Between 1791 and 1792, he worked as a clerk in the lower house of the Vermont legislature

In 1792, Eaton accepted a captain's commission in the Legion of the United States and began training at Legionville (Baden, Pennsylvania). He also married Eliza, the widow of General Timothy Danielson. In 1795, Eaton faced court-martial for charges resulting in a "misunderstanding" between himself and Lieutenant Colonel Henry Gaither. For the charges, which included those of profiteering and "liberating from confinement" a murder suspect, Eaton was sentenced to two months' suspended commission. Despite the conviction, Eaton held his commission until July 11, 1797, when he was appointed U.S. Consul at Tunis. He served at that post until war with Tripoli broke out in 1801. Other sources say he left the consul post in 1803.

=== Tunis (1799–1803) ===
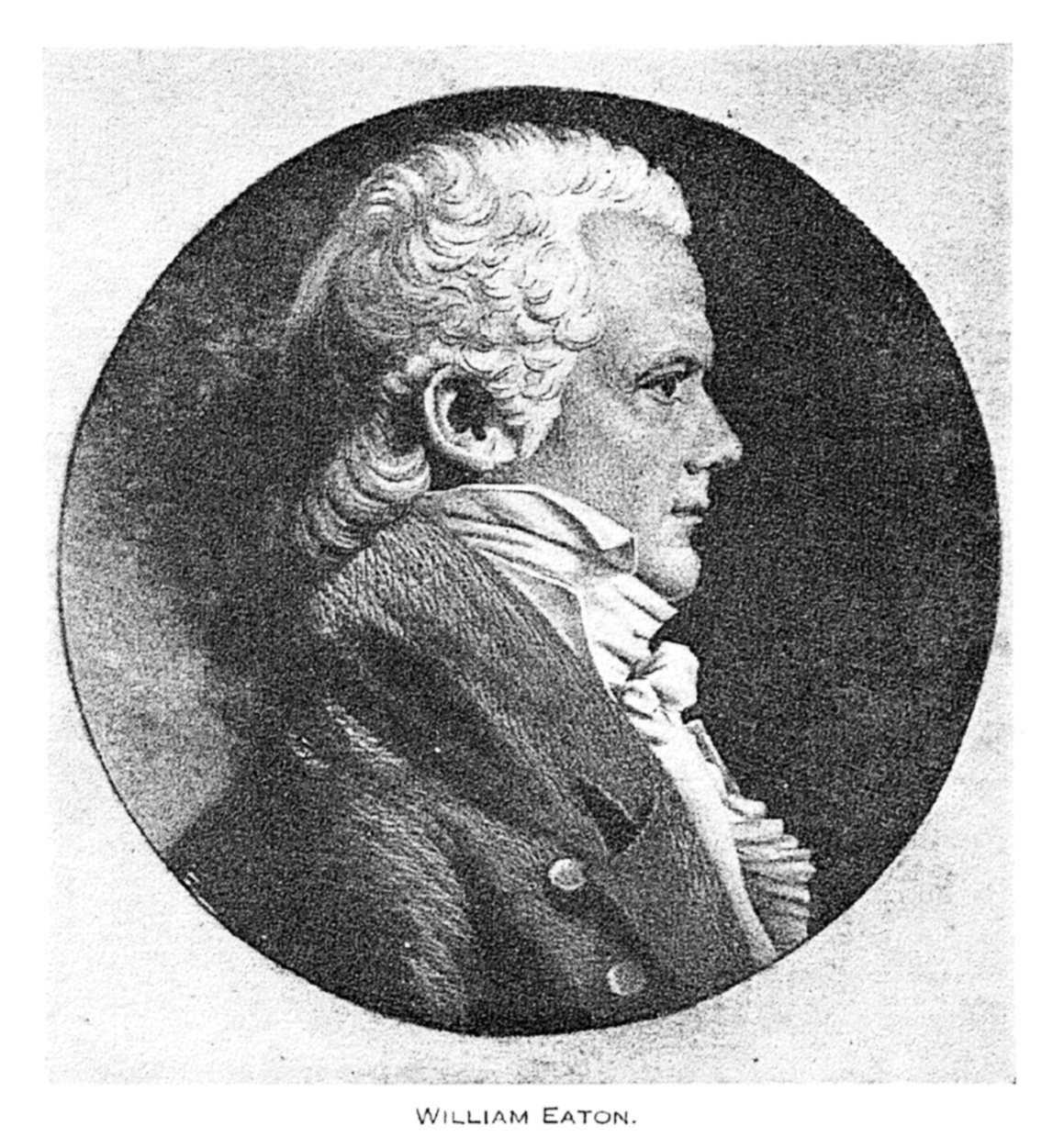
William Eaton, from Naval Documents

Eaton's main task in Tunis was to negotiate peace and trade agreements with the bey (governor). During the nineteenth century, European and American merchant ships were under threat by pirates from what was called "The Barbary Coast". The Barbary Coast was made up of several Muslim states, under the rule of the Ottoman Empire, that bordered the Mediterranean Sea in Northern Africa. They acquired revenue from raiding merchant vessels of their cargo, ransoming their crews or selling them into slavery. The European nations opted to pay tribute to the Barbary states to prevent such raids. After the American Revolution, the United States was left without Britain's protection in Mediterranean, thus the Washington and Adams administrations chose paying tribute to the Barbary states as a cost-effective alternative to military action.

By 1796, the United States was behind in payments to the dey of Algiers. In 1797, Joel Barlow, United States Consul to Algiers, negotiated with the dey and promised him a frigate, at the cost of nearly one million dollars. He then sent a French merchant, Joseph Stephen Famin, to negotiate with the bey of Tunis. An agreement was reached, but Congress would not ratify it. United States President John Adams appointed William Eaton as Consult to Tunis to negotiate more agreeable terms. It took two years to accomplish the task. In that time, as the demands of Algiers and Tripoli increased, Eaton had come to believe that it was better to use military force to secure trade in the region, than to continually pay tribute. He wrote an impassioned letter to the Secretary of State, James Madison, voicing the opinion that, "The more you give the more the Turks will ask for."

Jack Kelly, of the Pittsburgh Post-Gazette, wrote in the a 2009 article, Kill The Pirates, that Thomas Jefferson favored an international military intervention to the payment of tribute. Kelly said that Jefferson was unable to convince Europe to take such a course. When he became president of the United States, in 1801, he refused to pay tribute to Tripoli. The Atlantic Monthly (1860), called the belief that the United States was the first to refuse tribute to the Barbary pirates a "patriotic delusion". The article, flouting what it called "the popular view" of events said, "The money question between the President and the pasha was simply one of amount". It went on to say that Jefferson was motivated in his actions toward Tripoli by pressure from powerful merchants. The pasha of Tripoli, Yusef Karamanli (sometimes referred to as Karamanli or Karamanli), responded to the lack of payment by declaring war on the United States.

Tunis was the closest neighbor to Tripoli and the deposed pasha of Tripoli, Hamet Karamanli, was exiled there. He was, in fact, the elder brother of the reigning pasha, Yusuf Karamanli. William Eaton devised a plan in which the United States would support the restoration of Hamet Karamanli as pasha thereby creating fear of the U.S. within the rest of the Muslim world. He borrowed $22,000 to support the plan, but at this point did not receive the backing of the U.S. government. While the demands for tribute from the bey of Tunis continued, Eaton refused to convey the demands to the United States. He requested that he be recalled, as he felt he could no longer negotiate with the bey. In addition, a U.S. fleet, under the command of Commodore Richard Morris, had recently captured a Tunisian vessel that was headed for Tripoli. Morris came ashore in Tunis to visit Eaton and was arrested for Eaton's debt of $22,000. Eaton borrowed the money to pay the debt from the French Consul-General. At that point the bey ordered him to leave Tunis, which he did in the company of Morris. Hamet Karamanli, having failed at his attempt to regain Tripoli, fled to Egypt.

=== War with Tripoli and the Battle of Derne ===
Eaton returned to the Barbary region in 1804, this time on a military mission. It had taken months for word of Tripoli's declaration of war on the United States to reach President Jefferson, but he had already sent naval forces to the Barbary Coast because William Eaton had informed him that the situation in Tripoli was "nearing a breaking point." Among the vessels that were sent was the USS Philadelphia which, in October, 1803, under the command of Captain William Bainbridge, was sent to blockade Tripoli. The frigate ran aground off the coast of Tripoli and was captured along with its crew of 306 men. Bainbridge had failed to scuttle the ship before being captured, but Stephen Decatur, commander of the USS Intrepid, in a covert mission, destroyed the Philadelphia by burning it, to prevent Tripoli from using it.

On May 26, 1804, Eaton was commissioned by President Jefferson after a Cabinet meeting as the civilian “Navy Agent for the Several Barbary Regencies.” Eaton was then ordered to report to the commander of the U.S. Navy’s Mediterranean Squadron, Commodore Samuel Barron.

Eaton was ordered ashore to find Hamet Karamanli and enlist his cooperation in the war. Eaton found Karamanli in Alexandria and signed an agreement with him, although it is unclear if he had the authority to do so. This contract, which was forwarded to Secretary of State Madison, specified that the United States would provide cash, ammunition and provisions for Ahmed Karamanli's re-installation as pasha. It also designated William Eaton as "General and Commander in Chief" of the land forces that were to be used to carry out the operation. The agreement defined the relationship between Karamanli and Eaton as well as their mission, but was never ratified by the United States Senate.

The Americans included eight marines and two navy midshipmen. It was with that force that Eaton and Karamanli made the 600 mile trek from Alexandria to Derne, a coastal city within the realm of Tripoli. By the time the band had reached the Gulf of Bomba, they had eaten their last rations and the Arab factions were on the verge of mutiny. Eaton had written to Captain Isaac Hull of the USS Argus requesting that the ship meet them there with supplies, but when they arrived on April 15, there was no ship to be seen. The next day, however, the Argus appeared as Hull had seen the smoke from their fires. After resupplying, they continued their journey, and on April 27, 1805, Eaton's forces attacked and took control of Derne. "First Lieutenant Presley O'Bannon of the U.S. Marine Corps raised the American flag for the first time over a conquered foreign city." At the Battle of Derne, one marine was killed and two were wounded. Eaton was wounded in the left wrist.

Twice Yusef Karamanli's forces tried and failed to take back the city. With the bey of Derne on the run and Hamet Karamanli reestablished in Derne, Eaton thought to march toward Tripoli. He requested reinforcements from Barron but instead received word that US Consul-General Tobias Lear was negotiating peace with Yusef Karamanli. Then he received word from Lear himself that he was to surrender Derne as peace had been reached on June 4. The terms of the treaty required the US to pay $60,000 for the release of the crew of the Philadelphia. Hamet Karamanli and his entourage of about 30 were allowed to leave, but his wife and family were held captive until 1807, as provided in the treaty.

=== Aftermath ===
Although Eaton returned to the United States to a hero's welcome, he was disappointed and embittered by the treaty and outraged that ransom had to be paid for the freeing of the hostages. He had been denied victory in Tripoli and his agreement with Hamet Karamanli was left unkept. Furthermore, the government owed him money that he had fronted for the expedition. He complained loudly that the government was guilty of duplicity in regard to Hamet Karamanli. His complaints drew the attention of Jefferson's enemies in the Federalist party.

In January 1806, Congress was presented with a petition from Hamet Karamanli for money and the release of his family from his brother's custody. The issue became partisan with the Federalists supporting Karamanli's and Eaton's claims that the government had rescinded its agreement to re-establish Karamanli as Tripolitan pasha. Jefferson, and his supporters, on the other hand, denied that administration ever intended the arrangement, contending that Eaton had lacked the authority to broker the deal. Nevertheless, despite the Federalist opposition, the treaty with Tripoli was ratified by the Senate in April 1806, and the United States entered into an agreement with a Barbary state that, for the first time, did not include the payment of tribute.

Initially, Eaton's victory in Derne was viewed by both parties as the motivating factor for Tripoli in the settlement of the war. However, his willingness to become involved in the partisan bickering cost Eaton official recognition for his accomplishment. It had been proposed that Congress present Eaton with a sword, but Federalists argued that he be given a gold medal. The debate was never resolved thus he did not receive "a sword, a medal, a tract of public land or simply a resolution of thanks". He did however, receive 10,000 acres (40 km^{2}) from Massachusetts in present-day Maine.

=== Trial of Aaron Burr ===
Eaton was a principal witness in the 1807 treason trial of former United States Vice-President Aaron Burr. Burr was vice president during President Thomas Jefferson's first term (1801–1805). Avoiding murder charges resulting from the death of his political rival Alexander Hamilton in a duel (1804), Burr traveled throughout the west. During this time, he met with many military men who were disgruntled with the government, including Eaton and General James Wilkinson. According to Eaton's later testimony, he and Burr met several times, and Eaton came to believe that Burr was planning to raise an army to invade Spanish territory in the southwest and to establish an independent state, with himself as sovereign. Eaton then met with Jefferson to suggest that Burr be given an overseas post, warning that if he was not sent out of the country he would stage an insurrection within eighteen months. The President responded that he felt secure enough in the unity of the American people not to feel threatened by such an insurrection. Eaton again warned of Burr's plans, in the fall of 1806, when he forwarded to the State Department a letter that he had received from his stepson, Timothy Danielson Jr., sent to him by a friend in Ohio, Morris Belknap. The letter said that Burr had been purchasing boats in Ohio, and offering young men army posts. Finally, Wilkinson sent Jefferson a letter including what he claimed was a decryption of ciphered treasonous correspondence received from Burr.

In 1807, Burr was arrested for treason. Although Jefferson privately confided to Senator William Plumber of New Hampshire that he did not think there was enough evidence to convict Burr of treason, his public condemnation of Burr, along with Wilkinson's letter and the deposition of William Eaton, insured an indictment. On January 26, 1807, Eaton gave a deposition regarding his conversations with Burr. The affidavit stated that, as he listened to Burr's ambitions, Eaton came to believe that Burr was planning the overthrow of the United States government. He further stated that Burr offered him the rank of General in his army. Eaton continued to say,

"He [Burr] said, if he could gain over the marine corps, and secure the naval commanders, Truxton, Preble, Decatur, and others, he would turn Congress neck and heels out of doors; assassinate the President; seize on the treasury and navy; and declare himself the protector of an energetic government."

Burr's treason trial in Richmond, Virginia, began in August, 1807 with Eaton as the first prosecution witness. Eaton reiterated what he had said in his deposition. To discredit Eaton, the defense questioned Eaton about $10,000 he had received from the federal government since giving his deposition, implying that the administration had paid him for his testimony. Eaton countered that the $10,000 was, in fact, reimbursement for money he spent in the Barbary War (which one source contends was less than what he was owed). Historians are divided on the status of Eaton's testimony. While one states that it was wildly exaggerated, another counters that "Burr apologists" are responsible for that point of view. Whatever the case, presiding judge John Marshall and the jury were unconvinced, and Burr was acquitted.

Eaton was subpoenaed again for another trial, in Ohio. This time the defense sought to discredit Eaton's testimony by bringing up the court-martial brought against him while he was a captain. By this time the records of the court-martial had been destroyed in a fire. It scarcely mattered anyway, as the trial itself never took place.

== Final days ==
After peace with Tripoli was made, William Eaton returned to Brimfield, Massachusetts, the place he had called home for most of his life. He was elected to the state legislature, but only served one term. Burr's trial had proved to be a partisan issue, dividing the Federalists and the Jeffersonian Republicans. After the trial Eaton was verbal about the treatment that he had received from the Federalists, notably John Marshall, chief justice of the U.S. Supreme Court. Having lost the Federalist vote in Brimfield because of his outspokenness, Eaton failed at his bid for re-election.

Eaton suffered from rheumatism and gout, and by all accounts he had taken to drinking heavily. He was also in debt from gambling. He died on June 1, 1811, in Brimfield. Eaton was predeceased by his wife Eliza (née Sikes) Danielson; daughters Eliza (married Goodwin), Charlotte (married Sprague) and Almira (married Hayden); sons William Sikes and Nathaniel Johnson; stepson Timothy Danielson; and a stepdaughter. Skies and Johnson were West Point graduates.

== Legacy ==
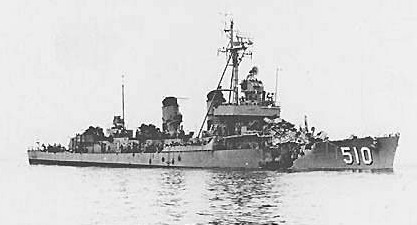
The Navy destroyer, the USS Eaton, named after General William Eaton

William Eaton is the namesake of four U.S. towns: Eatonton, Georgia, Eaton, New York, Eaton Twp, Pennsylvania and Eaton, Ohio. He was also the namesake of the Fletcher-class destroyer USS Eaton.

The Tripoli Monument, in memory of the first American military casualties overseas in the battle at Derne, was sculpted of Italian marble by artist Giovanni Micali in 1806, and transported to the United States by the frigate USS Constitution ("Old Ironsides") and placed at the new national capital of Washington, D.C. at the Washington Navy Yard on the East Branch (now the Anacostia River) of the Potomac River in 1808. Considered the first war monument in the United States, it was damaged during the burning of Washington by British forces in August 1814 as part of the War of 1812. Later in 1831, it was relocated to the west front of the United States Capitol, overlooking the National Mall. In 1860, it was relocated to the campus of the U.S. Naval Academy at Annapolis, Maryland, where although moved several more times over the decades, remains there today. In 2001, it underwent repairs and a physical restoration.

== In popular culture ==
Consul General Eaton and his actions at Derne with other U.S. Navy personnel along with Greek mercenaries, were loosely portrayed in the 1950 historical feature film Tripoli, starring John Payne, Maureen O'Hara, and Howard da Silva.

== Bibliography ==
- Adams, Henry. The History of the United States During the First Administration of Jefferson, Part II. Library of America. 2005 ISBN 1-4179-7065-0
- The Life of the Late General William Eaton: Principally Collected from his Correspondence and Other Manuscripts. Edited by Charles Prentiss. Printed by E. Merriam and Company, Brookfield, 1813.
- Rodd, Francis Rennell. General William Eaton--The Failure of an Idea. New York: Minton, Balch and Company, 1932.
