= USS Eaton =

Fletcher-class destroyer

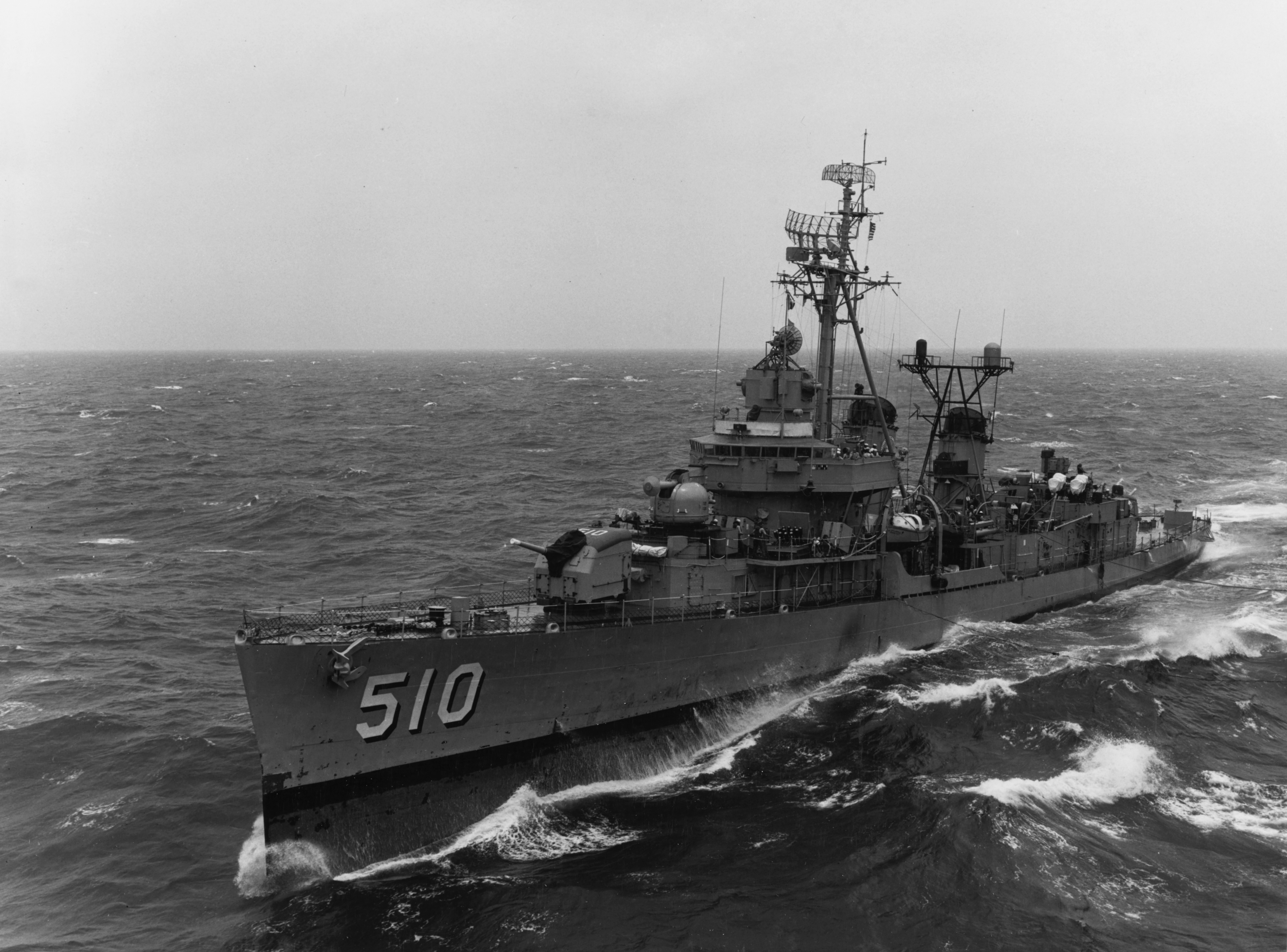
- USS Eaton in September 1964

History

United States
- Name: USS Eaton
- Namesake: William Eaton
- Builder: Bath Iron Works
- Laid down: 17 March 1942
- Launched: 20 September 1942
- Commissioned: 4 December 1942
- Decommissioned: 30 May 1969
- Stricken: 2 July 1969
- Motto: Defending Freedom and Democracy!
- Fate: Sunk as target 27 March 1970

General characteristics
- Class & type: Fletcher-class destroyer
- Displacement: 2,050 tons
- Length: 376 ft 6 in (114.7 m)
- Beam: 39 ft 8 in (12.1 m)
- Draft: 17 ft 9 in (5.4 m)
- Propulsion: 60,000 shp (45 MW); 2 propellers
- Speed: 35 knots (65 km/h; 40 mph)
- Range: 6500 nmi. (12,000 km) at 15 kt
- Complement: 336
- Armament: 5 × single Mk 12 5 in (127 mm)/38 guns; 5 × twin 40 mm (1.6 in) Bofors AA guns; 7 × single 20 mm (0.8 in) Oerlikon AA guns; 2 × quintuple 21 in (533 mm) torpedo tubes; 6 × single depth charge throwers; 2 × depth charge racks

USS Eaton (DD-510) was a Fletcher-class destroyer in the service of the United States Navy from 1942 to 1946. She was recommissioned from 1951 to 1969 and sunk as a target in 1970.

== World War II ==
The Eaton was launched 20 September 1942 by Bath Iron Works, Bath, Maine, sponsored by Mrs. Mary Eaton Phillips, great-great-granddaughter of General Eaton. She was commissioned 4 December 1942, named after William Eaton (1764–1811), an American soldier involved in the First Barbary War.

=== 1943 ===
Eaton departed Casco Bay, Maine, 6 February 1943 for duty in the Pacific. Arriving at Efate, New Hebrides, on 7 March, she patrolled with Cruiser Division 12 between Efate and the Solomons. She also escorted convoys from Espiritu Santo and Nouméa to Guadalcanal. After 10 August, from a new base at Port Purvis, Florida Island, she supported landings at Rendova, Vella Lavella, and Baracoma. In September, she rejoined Cruiser Division 12 for sweeps against Japanese shipping in the "Slot", sinking many barges. The I-20 Type-C Japanese submarine was sunk on the surface at Vella Lavella on 01 October 1943.

After a dash to Auckland, Eaton embarked Rear Admiral G. H. Fort and staff on 26 October and served as flagship for the landings on Treasury Island the following day. Prior to the landings at Empress Augusta Bay, she led fast minelayers USS Tracy (DM-19), and Pruitt (DM-22) through Bougainville Straits to seal off the eastern approach, on the night of 1-2 November.

She continued to patrol from Port Purvis to Bougainville. On 13 November, she rushed to help screen the crippled Denver (CL-58), damaged in the Battle of Empress Augusta Bay. Relieved by Dyson (DD-572) the following day, she continued to escort resupply convoys to Bougainville, Treasury, and Vella Lavella, as well as to bombard coast batteries and hunt Japanese ships.

=== 1944 ===
She took part in the landings on Green Island on 15 February 1944 and on Emirau Island on 20 March. Eaton sailed 4 May 1944 for the Marshalls, arriving at Majuro on the 7 May. Between 29 May and 2 June, she joined Greiner (DE-37) and Sanders (DE-40) in reconnaissance and bombardment of Kusaie Island in the eastern Carolines. On 11 June, she left Kwajalein for the invasion of Saipan, which began four days later. Eaton provided fire support, including harassing and illumination fire, against Saipan and Tinian and captured three Japanese aviators from a raft. On 12 August, she sailed from Saipan for overhaul at Mare Island.

Eaton joined the covering force for the Leyte operation at Leyte Gulf, 25 November 1944. She sank an enemy freighter on 1 December and bombarded Ormoc Bay as she headed to cover the Mindoro landings in December.

=== 1945 ===
Returning to Manus two days before Christmas, she was up in Lingayen Gulf, Luzon, on 9 January 1945 for screen and patrol duty. During the assault, the following night her crew destroyed an enemy suicide boat only 25 yards from the ship. The explosion killed one and wounded 14 of Eaton's men. She escorted transports in ballast from Lingayen to Leyte in January, bombarded Corregidor in February, and returned to Leyte Gulf on 1 March.

Through May, she continued in the liberation of the Philippines, in the landings at Mangarin Bay, Mindoro; on Panay, and on Mindanao. Sailing from Subic Bay 7 June 1945, Eaton covered the landings at Brunei Bay, Borneo, on 10 June, supporting minesweeping operations, and providing fire support for the invading Australians and underwater demolition teams. Next came invaluable aid to the assault on the great oil entrepot of Balikpapan, on 1 and 2 July. She returned to San Pedro Bay, 5 July, and her base for operations until the end of hostilities.

Eaton went north, 28 August 1945, to support minesweeping operations in the Yellow Sea off Jinsen (Inchon) in preparation for landings the following month. From 6 September to the end of October, she directed sweeping the Yangtze River approaches and acted as harbor entrance control vessel at Shanghai for the Yangtze River Patrol Force.

On 9 September, five Japanese vessels attempting to leave that port were intercepted and boarded by a party from Eaton; a prize crew remained on board Medium Landing Ship No. 5 for nearly a month. Joining the South China Force, Eaton was based at Hong Kong and visited ports on the 2,000-mile sweep of Chinese coast, from Haiphong, Indochina, to Hulutao, Manchuria, until 29 December 1945, also participating in the French Indochina convoy that took the 6th Chinese Army to Manchuria on merchant marine ships.

Other targets engaged by the Eaton during the war were eight enemy planes shot down.

She arrived at New York City on 8 February 1946 and the following month sailed to Charleston, South Carolina, where she was placed out of commission in reserve, 21 June 1946.

== After World War II ==
Reclassified DDE-510, 2 January 1951, Eaton was recommissioned 11 December 1951, at the Boston Naval Shipyard, and joined Escort Division 22 at Norfolk, Virginia, on 29 May 1952. She operated as far as the Caribbean and made two midshipman cruises in the summer of 1953, the first to England, France, and Italy, then to Halifax, Nova Scotia. She sailed on 28 April 1954 for NATO exercises off Derry, followed by a good-will tour of ports in Germany, Belgium, Denmark, England, and France before joining the 6th Fleet for exercises in the Mediterranean, including a mock "defense" of Turkey during which she "sank" the same "enemy" Turkish submarine twice. After rescuing four survivors from SS Mormackite on her return passage, Eaton arrived at Norfolk on 10 October.

In the early 1950s, Eaton collided with a surfacing submarine, but the following destroyer averted a worse collision owing to quick action of the captain. The collision resulted in damage to the submarine's periscopes and conning tower. In early 1956 during antisubmarine warfare exercises, Eaton was involved in a collision with the destroyer USS Power (DD-839).

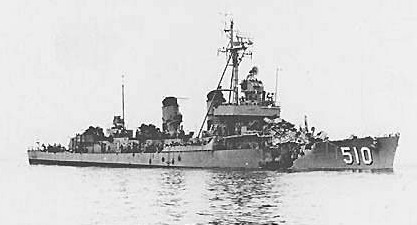
Eaton following collision with USS Wisconsin, 6 May 1956

On 6 May 1956, off the Virginia Capes, the battleship USS Wisconsin (BB-64) collided with the Eaton in thick fog while daylight steaming at high speed (20 knots). The collision caused serious damage to both ships, with Eaton contacting the battleship's bow on the starboard side forward of the bridge, which crushed to port side and broke the keel. The CPO mess area and mess deck were smashed. The ship's first lieutenant saved her by securing bow to stern with anchor chain and closing the watertight door beside his room. Only one sailor (a cook) was struck unconscious. Commander Richard Varley of the Eaton was later court-martialed and found negligent.

In another accident, the NOTS RUR-4 Weapon Alpha rocket-boosted depth charge projector misfired, with one warhead falling back onto the 01 deck and killing a seaman below.

An African cruise between 18 March and 26 July 1957 took Eaton by way of the Azores to Freetown, Simonstown, Mombasa, Aden, and Massawa. She operated through the blistering heat of the Red Sea between Aden and Massawa much of May, then on through the Suez Canal to Mediterranean ports and Norfolk. A visit to British waters in the fall of 1957 and two to Canada varied Eaton's Atlantic and Caribbean duty through 1960, participating during the Bay of Pigs Invasion events. Later, Eaton towed a disabled US Navy surveillance vessel from the Havana Harbor.

During the early 1960s, Eaton was assigned as flagship of Destroyer Squadron 28, serving in Destroyer Division 282 with USS Bache, Murray, and Beale. In 1967–68, she served in Vietnam along the gunline providing naval fire support up and down the Vietnamese coast.

On Memorial Day of 1969, Eaton was decommissioned and then later towed away and sunk as a target during gunnery practice in the Atlantic Ocean 90 nautical miles (167 km) off Norfolk, Virginia.

== Honors ==
Eaton received 11 battle stars for World War II service.
