= USS Hornet (1805 sloop) =

Sloops-of-war of the United States Navy

History

United States
- Name: USS Hornet
- Namesake: Hornet
- Acquired: April 1805
- Commissioned: April 1805
- Decommissioned: 3 September 1806
- Fate: Sold

General characteristics
- Displacement: 71 tons
- Complement: 34
- Armament: 10 guns

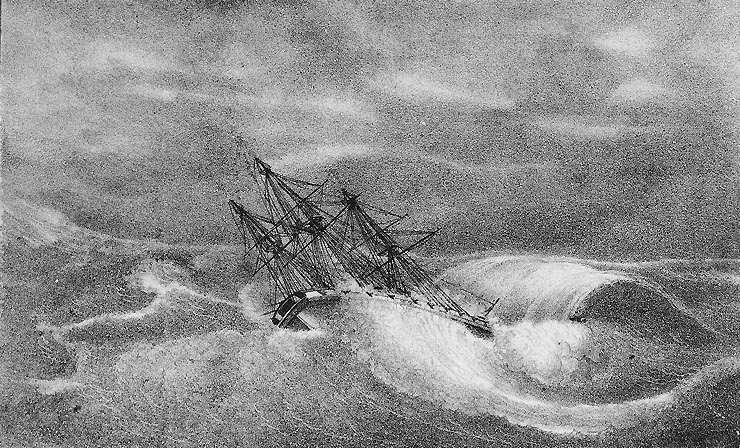
USS Hornet (1805, brig)

The second USS Hornet, was a single-masted, wooden-hulled sailing sloop-of-war of the United States Navy (Note: Not to be confused with the Brig Hornet also built in 1805, or the USS Hornet, a sidewheel steamer built in 1864) that saw service in the First Barbary War in the Mediterranean Sea along the shores of North Africa. The ship was formerly the merchant ship Traveller of Massachusetts and was purchased at Malta by the U.S. Navy to join in the American blockade at Tripoli.

== First Barbary War ==
In April 1805, during the First Barbary War the Hornet with Lieutenant Samuel Evans in command, sailed for the Mediterranean Sea to join the American fleet blockading the harbor at Tripoli, joining up with the ships Argus and Nautilus The Hornet was to accompany the Argus to take supplies and money to meet Eaton and his land expedition at Bomba and to later join up with the fleet, commanded by Commodore John Rodgers in the bombardment of Derna and later Tripoli. Her bombardment in company with Argus and Nautilus on 27 April 1805 helped force the surrender of Derna to a land expedition bringing pressure to bear on the besieged port of Tripoli, where the Pasha soon accepted terms of peace.

After helping to evacuate the expedition from Derna, she was with the U.S. fleet at Tunis on 30 July. and other Barbary ports later. This was effective in quelling threats of piratical acts against merchant shipping in the Mediterranean. Hornet continued patrols to ensure safety of American commerce in the Mediterranean until 3 June 1806. After riding out a severe gale that carried away her top mast, she arrived in Philadelphia on 9 August. Hornet was decommissioned and sold at Philadelphia on 3 September 1806.

== See also ==
- List of sailing frigates of the United States Navy
- List of sloops of war of the United States Navy

== Bibliography ==
- Harris, Gardner W. (1837). The life and services of Commodore William Bainbridge, United States Navy.
  Carey Lea & Blanchard, New York. p. 254. ISBN 0-945726-58-9. Url1 Url2
- Cooper, James Fenimore (1826). History of the navy of the United States of America.
  Stringer & Townsend, New York. p. 508. OCLC 197401914. Url
- Whipple, Addison Beecher Colvin (2001). To the Shores of Tripoli: the birth of the U.S. Navy and Marines.
  Naval Institute Press, 2001. p. 296. ISBN 978-1557509666.
- Dept U.S.Navy. "Hornet". Dictionary of American Naval Fighting Ships.
  DEPARTMENT OF THE NAVY -- NAVAL HISTORICAL CENTER. Archived from the original on 27 August 2004.
