= Tripoli Monument (sculpture) =

Great Monument

- United States Naval Academy
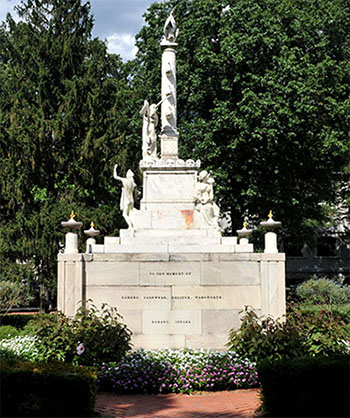
- Campus of the U.S. Naval Academy
- For the memory of Somers, Caldwell, Decatur, Wadsworth, Dorsey, Israel
- Unveiled: 1808 (sculpted 1806)
- Location: 38°58′59″N 76°29′15″W; Annapolis, Maryland near the Officers' and Faculty Club
- Designed by: Giovanni C. Micali
- As a small tribute of respect to their memory and of admiration of their valour so worthy of imitation their brother officers have erected this monument.

The Tripoli Monument is the oldest military monument in the United States. It honors heroes of the United States Navy from the First Barbary War (1801–1805): Master Commandant Richard Somers, Lieutenant James Caldwell, James Decatur (brother of Capt. Stephen Decatur), Henry Wadsworth, Joseph Israel, and John Sword Dorsey. It was carved in Livorno, Italy, in 1806 and brought to the United States on board the famous 1797 frigate USS Constitution ("Old Ironsides"). It was originally installed in the Washington Navy Yard at the new national capital of Washington, D.C., in 1808. It was moved to the west front terrace of the United States Capitol facing the National Mall in 1831, and then to the United States Naval Academy campus in Annapolis, Maryland, in 1860.

== Description ==
The white marble sculpture consists of a thirty foot high column topped by an eagle and mounted on an elaborate base adorned with allegorical figures representing Glory, Fame, History, and Commerce. History, on the northwest corner, is represented by a seated female figure holding a book in her proper left hand and a pen made of bronze gilt in her proper right hand. She looks up and begins to record the event that she sees. Commerce, on the northeast corner, is represented by a male figure pointing to the column with his proper right hand and holding a caduceus in his proper left hand. Winged Victory stands beside the column, her proper right hand holding a laurel wreath over a sarcophagus and her proper left hand holding a bronze gilt palm branch. The column is adorned with two rows of antique "beaks of galleys" and two rows of antique anchors carved in relief. The sculpture rests on a square base constructed with blocks of stone and adorned with an urn on each corner.

The monument is made of Carrara marble with a sandstone base and measures 360 by 192 by 192 inches (9.1 m × 4.9 m × 4.9 m). It is also known as the U. S. Naval Monument, the Naval Monument, and the Peace Monument. The designer was Giovanni Charles Micali (sometimes Giovanni Carlo Micali), who signed his work as Giov. Charles Micali Invento·In Livorno 1806.

== Inscriptions ==
On the north side of the monument's base is Micali's signature as described above. On the west side of the monument's base is inscribed:

The love of Glory inspired them
Fame has crowned their deeds
History records the event
The children of Columbia admire
And commerce laments their fall

On the east side of the monument's base:

As a small tribute of respect to their memory
and of admiration of their valour
so worthy of imitation
their brother officers
have erected this monument

On the south side of the monument's base:

Erected in the memory of Captain
Richard Somers, Lieutenant
James Caldwell, James Decatur,
Henry Wadsworth, Joseph Israel,
and John Dorsey who fell in the different
attacks that were made on the city of Tripoli
in the Year of our Lord 1804
and in the 28 year of the independence
of the United States

On each face of the larger bottom base is inscribed:

TO THE MEMORY OF
SOMERS, CALDWELL, DECATUR, WADSWORTH,
DORSEY, ISRAEL

Near the monument is a brass historical plaque placed there after a restoration undertaken in 2000. The first two paragraphs of the plaque are

THE TRIPOLI MONUMENT
The oldest military monument in the United States honors heroes of the War against
the Barbary Coast Pirates, the new republic's first war. In 1804, President Jefferson ordered
the nation's tiny naval force to the Mediterranean to protect the expanding trade of the new
United States against the pirates, who demanded ransom for safe passage of merchant ships.

"Millions for defense, but not one cent for tribute" became the rallying cry for this war.
Jefferson's action established the doctrine of extension of power overseas and created
a permanent United States Navy.

== History of the monument ==
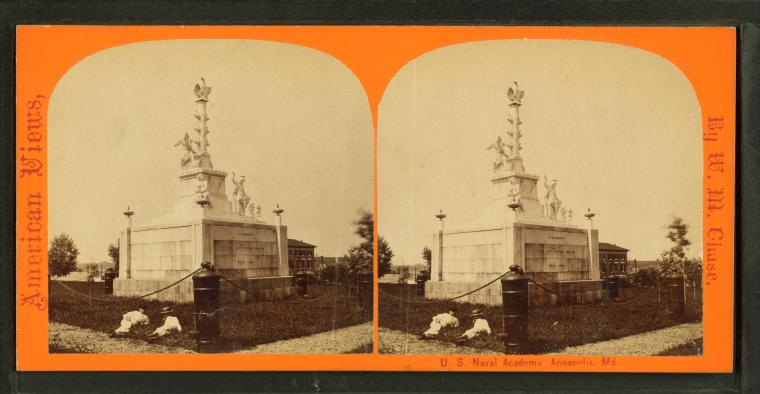
The Tripoli Monument with Naval Academy midshipmen at Annapolis in the foreground, circa 1868, eight years after its arrival there

At the conclusion of the First Barbary War (1801–1805), Navy Captain David Porter assumed the task of creating a suitable monument for the fallen officers, working with the Bishop of Florence. Porter commissioned Micali to produce the piece for $3000, half of Micali's usual fee. It was completed in 1806, then shipped to Newport, Rhode Island on board the frigate USS Constitution ("Old Ironsides"). It was then shipped south to the new national capital of Washington, D.C., where it was placed at the Washington Navy Yard on the banks of the Potomac River.

The monument was damaged in August 1814 during the burning of Washington by British forces during the War of 1812, but it was later restored. In 1831, it was moved to the United States Capitol on the west front facing the National Mall. Porter was not happy with its situation there, remarking that it had "been placed in a small circular pond of dirty fresh water—not large enough for a duck puddle—to represent the Mediterranean Sea."

Resolution came in 1860 when the monument was moved to the campus of the U.S. Naval Academy at Annapolis, Maryland. It was moved and relocated several times around campus as the academy expanded before finally being situated in front of the Academy's Officers' and Faculty Club.

The Smithsonian American Art Museum noted that the Tripoli Monument needed treatment in August 1994, and the restoration was completed in June 2000. There is some conjecture that the figures of Glory, History, Commerce, and Fame are not in Micali's original positions. The adjustment may have occurred in the transition to the Capitol in 1831.
