= USS Argus (1803) =

Brig in the United States Navy commissioned in 1803

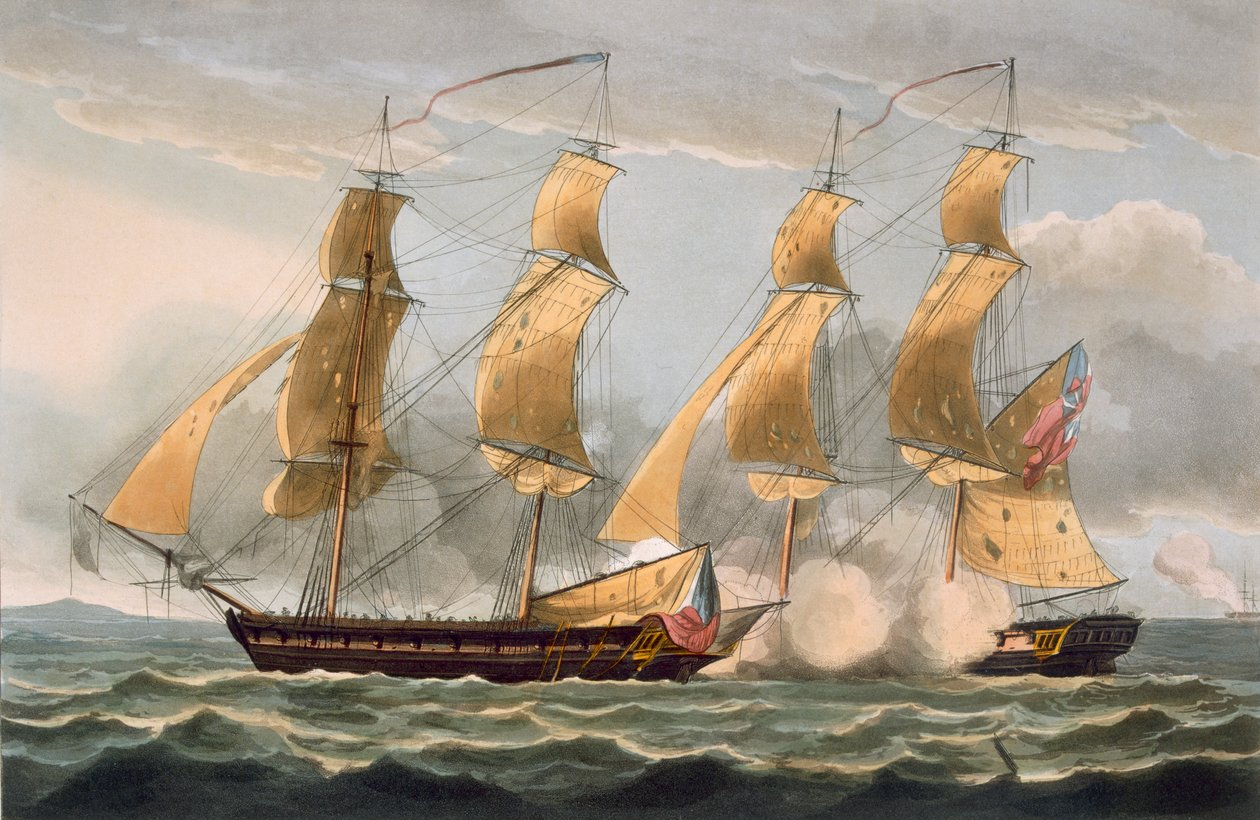
- Argus (left) surrendering to HMS Pelican on 14 August 1813

History

United States
- Name: USS Merrimack
- Namesake: The Merrimack River in Massachusetts and New Hampshire
- Ordered: 29 April 1803
- Builder: Edmund Hartt
- Cost: $37,428
- Laid down: 12 May 1803
- Launched: 21 August 1803
- Commissioned: 6 September 1803
- Renamed: USS Argus 4 June 1803
- Namesake: Argus Panoptes, in Greek mythology a monster with a hundred eyes slain by the messenger of the gods Hermes
- Launched: 21 August 1803
- Commissioned: August or September 1803
- Out of service: 1806 (in ordinary)
- In service: 1807 (returned to full commission)
- Fate: Captured 14 August 1813

General characteristics
- Type: Brig
- Tons burthen: 299 (bm)
- Length: Gun-deck: 94 ft 6 in (28.80 m); Keel: 77 ft (23 m)
- Beam: 28 ft 2 in (8.59 m)
- Depth of hold: 12 ft 8 in (3.86 m)
- Propulsion: Sail
- Complement: 142 officers and enlisted
- Armament: 2 × 12-pounder guns; 18 × 24-pounder carronades

USS Argus, originally named USS Merrimack, was a 20-gun brig of the United States Navy commissioned in 1803. She enforced the Embargo Act of 1807 and fought in the First Barbary War – taking part in the blockade of Tripoli and the capture of Derna – and the War of 1812. During the latter conflict, she had been raiding British merchant shipping in British home waters for a month, when the heavier British Cruizer-class brig-sloop HMS Pelican intercepted her. After a sharp fight during which Argus's captain, Master Commandant William Henry Allen, was mortally wounded, Argus surrendered when the crew of Pelican were about to board.

== Construction and commissioning ==
The United States Congress authorized construction of the brig, originally named USS Merrimack, the second U.S. Navy ship of that name, on 23 February 1803, and on 29 April 1803 the U.S. Navy contracted with the shipyard of Edmund Hartt at Boston, Massachusetts, to construct the ship. Edmund Hartt's brother, Joseph Hartt, drafted the plans for the brig, designed with a flush deck and fine lines to optimize her for sailing conditions in the Mediterranean Sea. Captain Edward Preble was appointed superintendent of her construction, and her keel was laid down at Hartt's yard on 12 May 1803.

On 14 May 1803, two days after Merrimack's keel was laid, United States Secretary of the Navy Robert Smith assigned Preble to duty as commanding officer of the frigate USS Constitution, then at Boston, in addition to his duties related to Merrimack's construction. Smith informed Preble on 21 May 1803 that Preble was to take command of the U.S. Navy's Mediterranean Squadron, which was to include Constitution and Merrimack, and on 27 May ordered Lieutenant Stephen Decatur Jr. to take command of Merrimack and supervise her construction to allow Preble to focus on preparing Constitution for Mediterranean service.

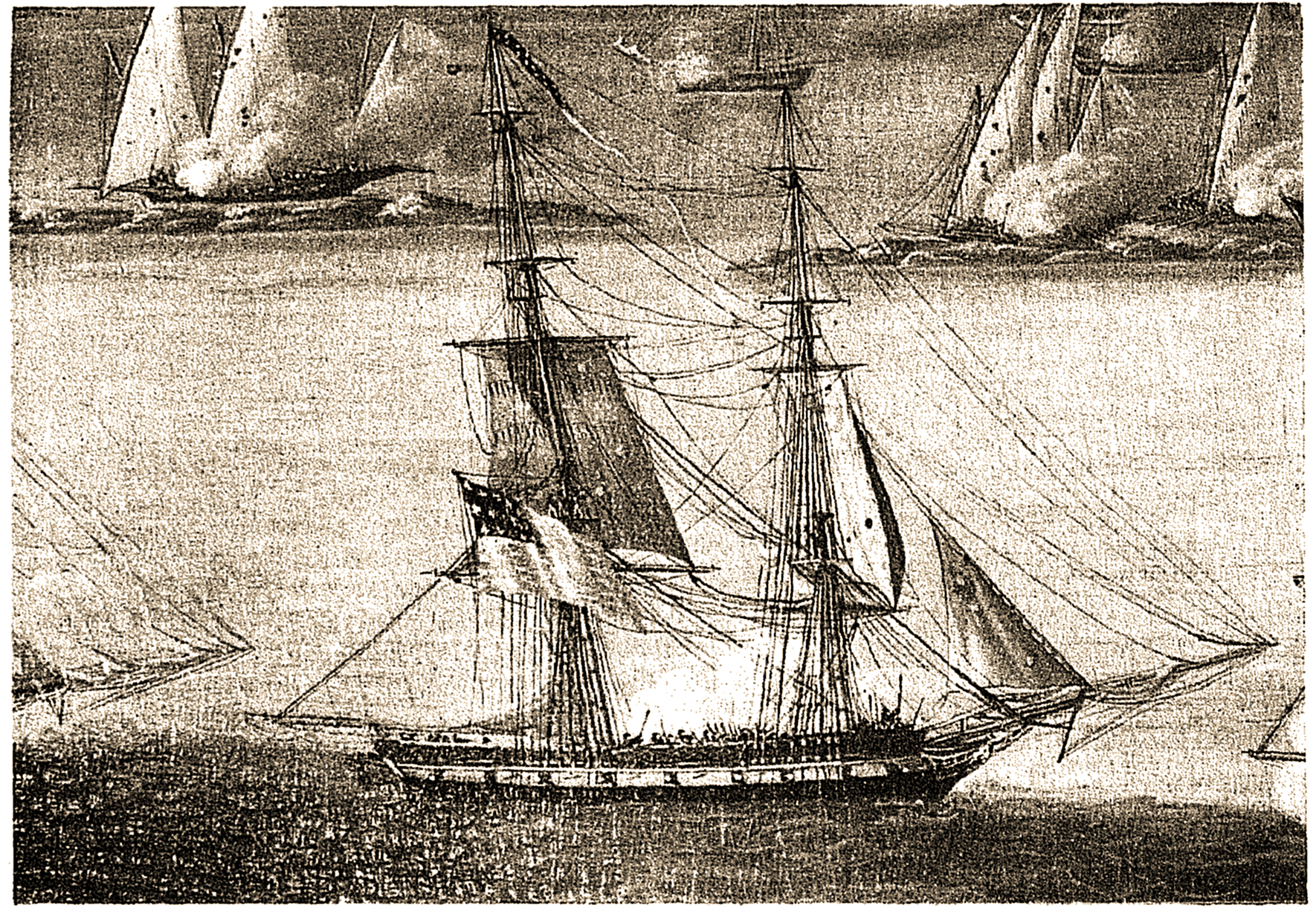
USS Argus (1803), date unknown

Smith found that U.S. Navy officers disliked the name Merrimack for the new brig, and he directed that she be renamed Argus, the first U.S. Navy ship of that name, on 4 June 1803. Although work on her construction proceeded quickly at first, Decatur reported on 11 July 1803 soon after arriving to take command that her construction had fallen behind schedule, although her builders assured him that she would be launched before the end of July. Decatur recruited her crew and procured her armament from Providence, Rhode Island, but by the beginning of August 1803 heavy and persistent rains had delayed her launching by two weeks. Her launch day finally came on 20 August 1803, but the attempt to launch her failed when she did not move down the ways. After the ways' degree of incline was increased, Argus was successfully launched on 21 August 1803. Labor problems during her fitting out then delayed her completion but, though no document recording the date of her commissioning has been found, she was in commission and ready for sea by early September 1803.

In service, Argus was reported to sail swiftly and easily, although prone to heavy pitching when lying to (i.e., when her sails were arranged so as to counteract each other). On more than one occasion, observers described her as a remarkably handsome ship.

== First Barbary War ==
Argus set sail from Boston on 8 September 1803, bound for the Mediterranean and service with the Mediterranean Squadron in the First Barbary War. She soon suffered a badly sprung bowsprit in exceptionally heavy seas, and Decatur put into Newport, Rhode Island, on 18 September 1803 to have it fixed, reasoning that repairs would be far easier in the United States than in the Mediterranean. She returned to sea on 28 September 1803 and set a course for Gibraltar, where she arrived after a transatlantic voyage on 1 November 1803. There, Decatur exchanged commands with Lieutenant Isaac Hull, relinquishing command of Argus to Hull and relieving Hull of command of the schooner USS Enterprise on 9 November, as was ordered on 7 November.

Argus made a brief cruise to the east and then, in accordance with orders from now-Commodore Preble, commander of the Mediterranean Squadron, returned to Gibraltar to watch the Moroccans while the rest of the squadron sailed east to blockade Tripoli. During the early part of 1804, she cruised the western Mediterranean in an unsuccessful search for a Tripolitan cruiser reportedly operating in that area. In March 1804, she received orders to join the rest of the squadron off Tripoli.

=== Blockade of Tripoli ===
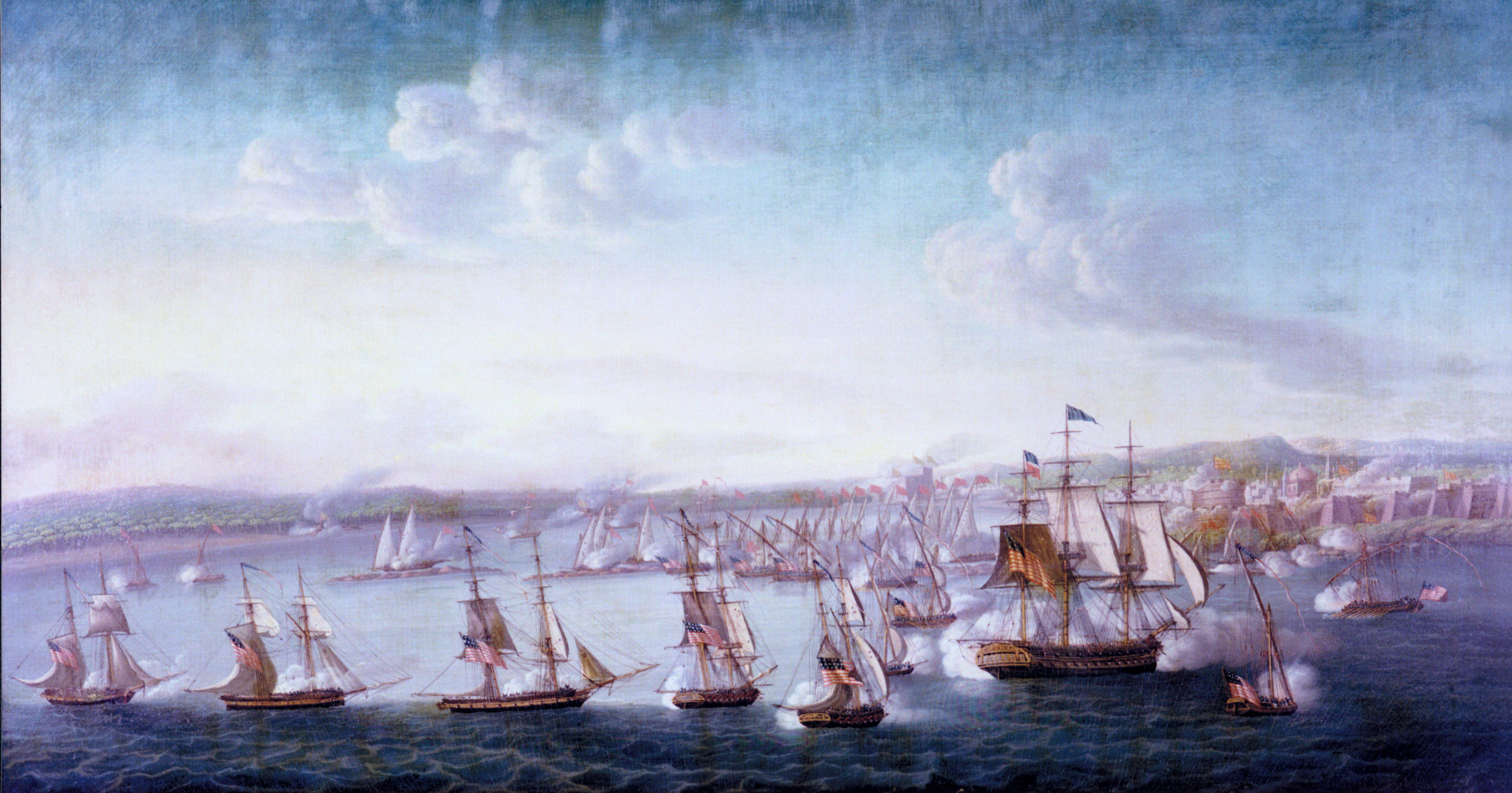
USS Argus (third from left) participating in the bombardment of Tripoli, 3 August 1804, painting by Michele Felice Cornè, 1752–1845

Her boats captured a small sloop loaded with earthenware anchored close to the Tripoli coast on 30 April 1804. Argus arrived off Tripoli in company with Constitution and Enterprise. On 31 May she captured Ketch "Virgine Del Rosario" leaving Tripoli. She left the blockade late in the month of June to join a neutral ship at Syracuse, Sicily, and escort her back to Tripoli with supplies for the captive officers and crew of the frigate USS Philadelphia which had been taken by the Tripolitans after she had run aground on an uncharted reef off Tripoli in October 1803.

Argus resumed her blockade duties on 7 July 1804. At that point, Preble began preparations for a shore bombardment. Heavy weather, however, postponed the action until early August. On 3 August 1804, the squadron moved in to provide long-range support for the gunboats and mortar boats actually engaged in the bombardment. The bombardment was considerably less damaging to the defensive works protecting Tripoli than hoped for, though the American gunboat crews boarded and carried several of the Tripolitan vessels sent out to engage them. The squadron conducted another ineffectual bombardment of Tripoli on 7 August 1804. Two days later, Commodore Preble embarked in Argus to reconnoiter Tripoli harbor. During that mission, Tripolitan shore batteries fired upon Argus, and she was struck below the waterline by a single shot. Fortunately for her, the shot did not pass all the way through her hull, and she remained on station off Tripoli.

On 28 August 1804, the squadron conducted a third bombardment of the defenses of Tripoli in which its guns inflicted severe damage. A week later, on the night of 4 September 1804, Argus was among the ships that escorted the ill-fated fire ship USS Intrepid to the entrance of Tripoli harbor. When Intrepid blew up prematurely, killing her entire crew, Argus remained there to pick up survivors, but none had appeared by sunrise when she returned to her blockade station. On 12 September she captured Greek polaca St. Michael attempting to run the blockade into Tripoli. On 26 November 1804 she arrived at Alexandria, Egypt carrying U. S. government agents whose mission was to make contact with the former Bashaw of Tripoli to get him to lead an expedition to take Derna and Benghazi. On 19 February 1805 she departed Alexandria for Syracuse, Sicily. She arrived in the Gulf of Bomba, nation of Tripoli, on 17 April with supplies for the expedition advancing on Derna. On 22 April 1805 she captured an Ottoman flagged 30 ton lateen vessel off the Gulf of Bomba that was carrying contraband goods, including gunpowder, to Benghazi.

=== Capture of Derna ===
Through the winter of 1804–1805, Argus alternated between blockade duty off Tripoli and periods in port at Malta and Syracuse. In the spring of 1805, she participated in one of the more celebrated episodes of American naval history, the capture of Derna. During the preceding months, she had made several voyages to Egypt in support of Consul William Eaton's efforts to raise a force of men to take Derna in conjunction with the deposed pasha. After a march of over 600 miles (970 km) across the Libyan Desert in what is now Libya, the polyglot army – there were only 10 Americans in the whole force – arrived at Derna on 25 April 1805. Argus had met the army a day or two earlier at the Gulf of Bomba to provide provisions. Now, she made preparations to provide bombardment assistance for the landward assault.

Eaton's force launched its attack on Derna on 27 April 1805. Argus and the schooner USS Nautilus anchored about half a mile (800 meters) to the eastward of the fortifications. The Tripolitans opened fire almost immediately upon Argus and the sloop-of-war USS Hornet, anchored quite a bit nearer than Argus and Nautilus. By 14:45 that afternoon, gunfire from the ships silenced all of the guns in the city. A desperate charge led by United States Marine Corps Lieutenant Presley O'Bannon managed to carry the gun batteries by storm and breathed new life into the assault. After hoisting the American flag over the battlements, O'Bannon ordered the already loaded captured guns to be turned on the town. By 16:00 that afternoon, the entire town had fallen to Eaton's army, and the enemy fled to the hinterland. The capture of Derna has been immortalized in the words of the Marines' Hymn ("... to the shores of Tripoli").

After Eaton's and O'Bannon's victory, a Tripolitan army, which had been sent to reinforce the town, arrived and began preparations to retake Derna. Argus remained offshore to provide gunfire support in the defense of the town throughout the occupation of Derna. When the Tripolitans finally assaulted the town on 13 May 1805, Argus joined in the fray and enabled the defensive forces narrowly to beat back the charging enemy troops. Argus's guns wreaked havoc among the enemy forces during their headlong retreat. Between that time and early June 1805, the Tripolitans made a few more half-hearted approaches during which Argus's long 12-pounders came into play. However, things remained relatively quiet, for negotiations with the pasha in power were already underway. On 11 June 1805, orders arrived for Eaton's force to evacuate Derna as negotiations had been concluded. The troops and the deposed pasha were embarked in Constellation that evening, and Argus and the other American ships quit the area.

== Operations, 1805–1812 ==
Argus continued to cruise the Mediterranean until the summer of 1806. She returned to the United States at the Washington Navy Yard in Washington, D.C., on 13 July 1806 and was laid up there in ordinary. In 1807, she was fitted out at the Washington Navy Yard, returned to full commission, and began a series of cruises along the Atlantic coast of the United States to enforce the Embargo Act of 1807, which she continued through the outbreak of the War of 1812 between the United States and the United Kingdom in June 1812.

== War of 1812 ==
After the outbreak of war, Argus continued her cruises off the U.S. Atlantic coast. During one cruise between 8 October 1812 and 3 January 1813, she captured six prizes and escaped from a British squadron after a three-day chase. Through clever handling, she even managed to take one of the prizes as she was fleeing from the overwhelmingly superior British force.

=== Capture by HMS Pelican ===
==== Prelude ====
Under the command of Master Commandant William Henry Allen, Argus broke out of New York Harbor on 18 June 1813, evading the British blockade. Her mission was not warlike to begin with; it was to deliver William H. Crawford to his post as Minister to the First French Empire. Argus arrived at Lorient in Brittany, France, on 11 July 1813, disembarked Crawford, and put out to sea again three days later to begin raiding British shipping in the English Channel and Irish Sea. During the next month, she captured nineteen merchant ships. Rather than weaken his crew by sending the captured ships to American, French, or neutral ports under prize crews, Allen set most of the captured ships on fire. The intense operations exhausted Argus's crew.

The shipping losses soon caused insurance rates for merchant shipping to increase. The cargo on the captured ships was worth about two million dollars. The British Admiralty sent orders to all available ships to track down and defeat Argus. The British brig-sloop HMS Pelican had just arrived in Cork Harbour in Ireland, having escorted a convoy from the West Indies, and immediately put to sea again on 10 August 1813. Pelican's captain was Commander John Fordyce Maple, an officer who had joined the Royal Navy when he was twelve years old in 1782, two years before William Henry Allen was born.

On 13 August, Argus took two final prizes. One of them was from Porto, Portugal, and was carrying wine. Both American and British historians have claimed that Argus's crew looted some of the captured cargo, and that their debauched state affected their performance during the coming battle with Pelican. As with Argus's previous captures, the Americans set fire to the prize; as Pelican was near enough to sight the smoke from the burning vessel, she made for the American ship straight away.

==== Battle and capture ====
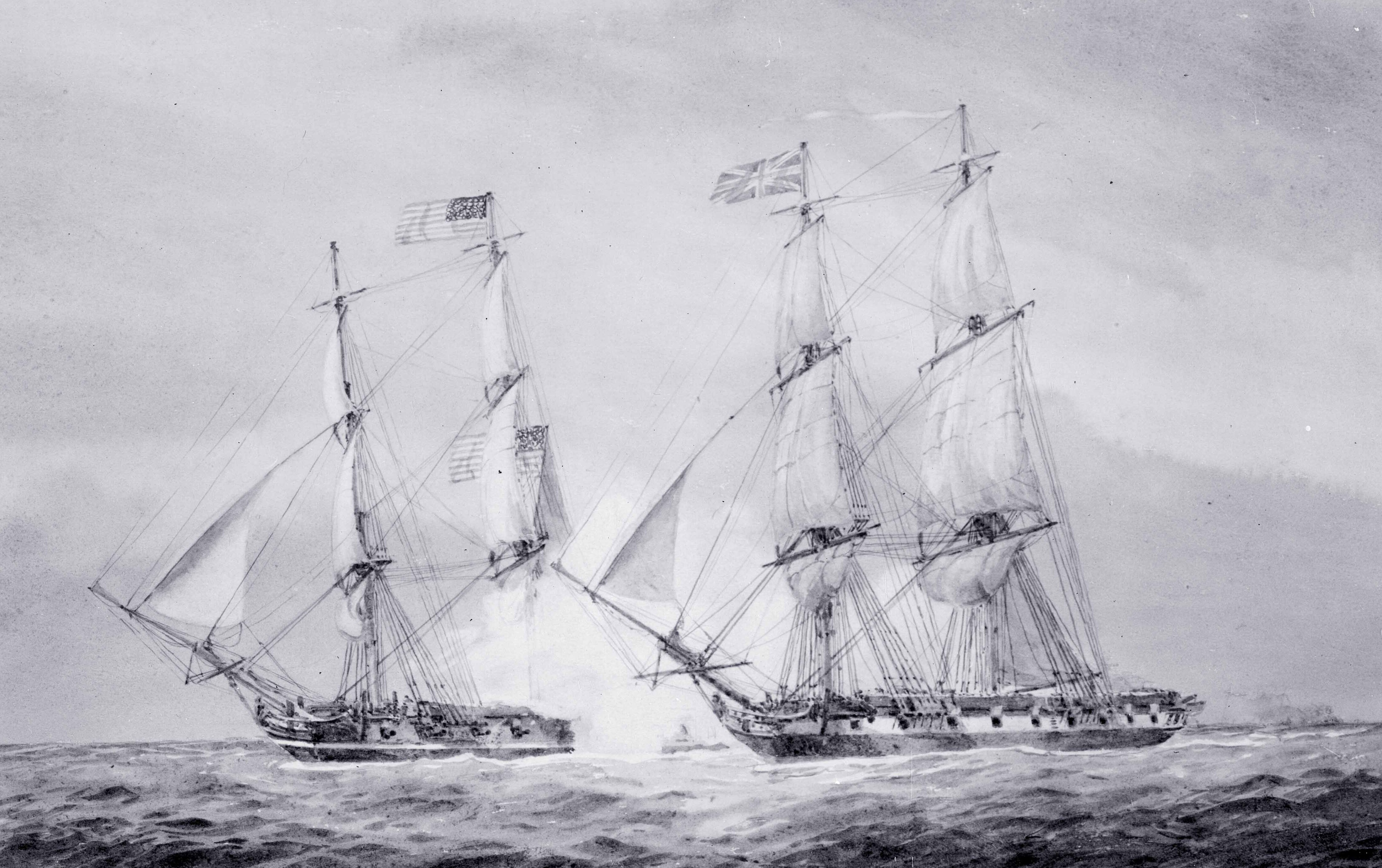
Pelican engaging Argus (left)

At 05:00 on the morning of 14 August 1813, Argus and Pelican sighted each other five leagues (about 15 miles) west of St David's Head. Argus was the faster but more lightly armed vessel, with eighteen 24-pounder carronades and a 12-pounder chase gun against the Pelican's sixteen 32-pounder carronades, one 12-pounder long gun, and two 6-pounder long guns. Allen could have used Argus's greater speed to escape. Instead, he decided to engage in battle. Allen's decision to accept battle against a heavier opponent stemmed from confidence gained while he was the first lieutenant of the frigate USS United States when she captured the British frigate HMS Macedonian on 25 October 1812; following his promotion he had boasted that he could "take any British 22-gun sloop-of-war in ten minutes".

The wind was from the south, giving Pelican the weather gauge (i.e. the windward position). Allen sailed westward on the port tack (i.e., with the wind to port) and opposed his port side battery to Pelican's starboard battery.

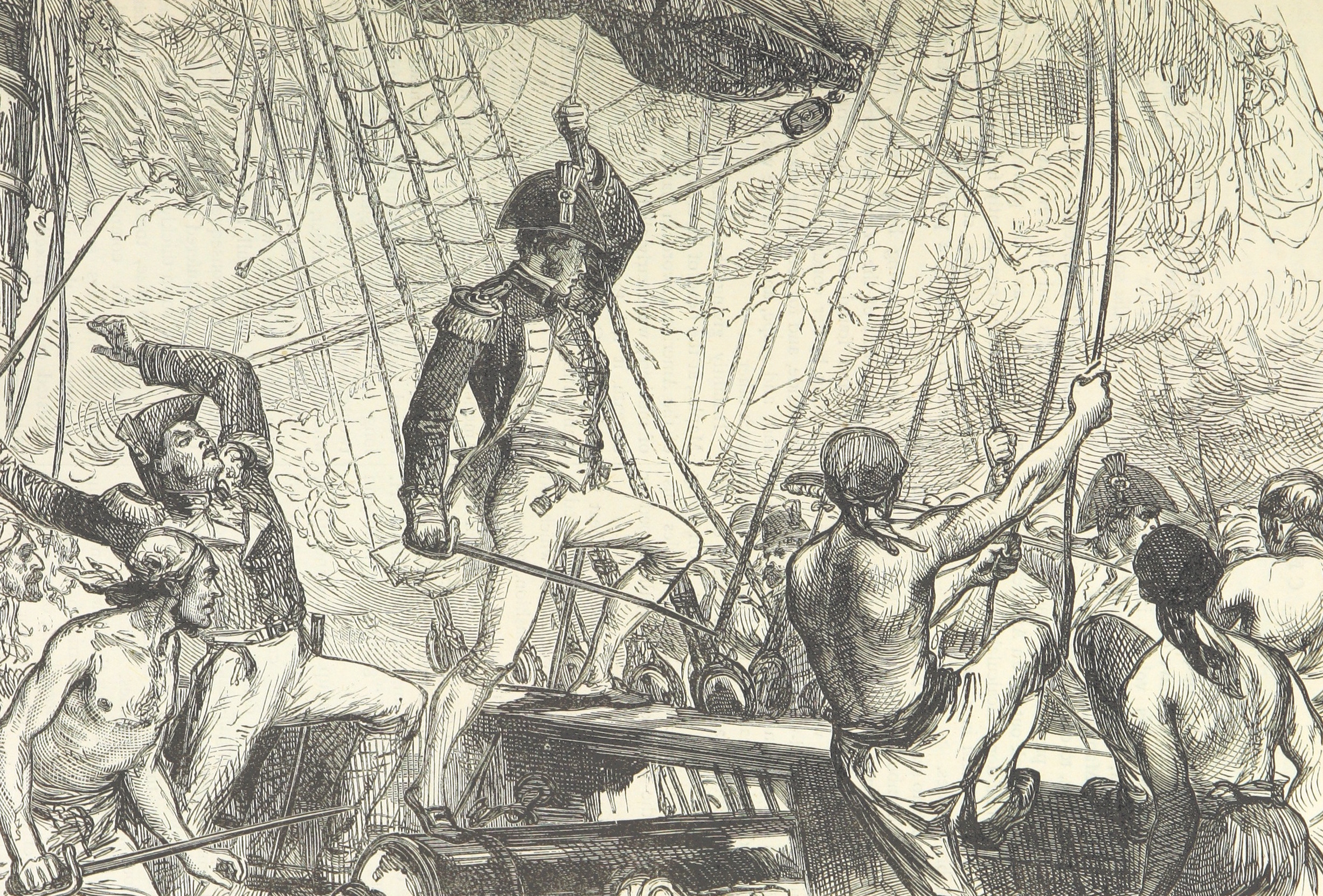
Pelican's crew preparing to board Argus

Four minutes after the ships exchanged their first broadsides, Allen lost a leg. His first lieutenant was also badly wounded, and Argus's rigging was badly cut up. Pelican tried to cross Argus's stern to deliver raking fire but Argus's second lieutenant, William Howard Allen (not related to the commanding officer), threw his sails aback to slow the American brig and instead raked Pelican. This did not fatally cripple the British vessel, and the two brigs continued to exchange broadsides, with Pelican now to leeward. After four more minutes, Argus's rigging was too badly damaged for the Americans to prevent Pelican from crossing Argus's stern and delivering several raking broadsides. Finally, three-quarters of an hour after the action began, the two vessels came into contact, Argus's bow against Pelican's quarter. British boarding parties mustered, but before they could board Argus the Americans surrendered.

Unusually for the War of 1812, the American gunnery in this engagement was comparatively ineffective, although Pelican's sides were "filled with grapeshot" and two of Pelican's carronades had been dismounted. British gunnery was "at least of the standard which had brought victory in a hundred victories against the French."

==== Aftermath ====
Pelican and the captured Argus went in to Plymouth, England. Allen died there of his wounds a week after the battle. He was buried with full military honors. The rest of the crew, including sailing master Uriah P. Levy, were held as prisoners of war in England for the duration of the war.

In 1813, construction commenced for a replacement 18-gun brig Argus at the Washington Naval Yard – but the ship was destroyed in the burning of Washington the following year before it could be launched.

== See also ==
- List of ships captured in the 19th century
- Bibliography of early American naval history
