= Ottoman Cyrenaica =

Ottoman Cyrenaica, also known as Sanjak of Benghazi or Sanjak of Barqa, was a wilayah and later mutasarrifate in North Africa, within the Vilayet of Tripolitania. In 1911 it was colonized by Italy, becoming Italian Cyrenaica.

In 1879, Cyrenaica became a wilayah of the Ottoman Empire.

In 1888, it became a mutasarrıfiyya under a mutasarrıf and was further divided into five qadaas. The wali of Ottoman Tripolitania however looked after the military and judicial affairs. The bureaucratic setup was similar to the one in Tripoli. The mutasarrıfate existed until the Italian invasion.
