= Bomba, Libya =

Bomba البمبة
- Village
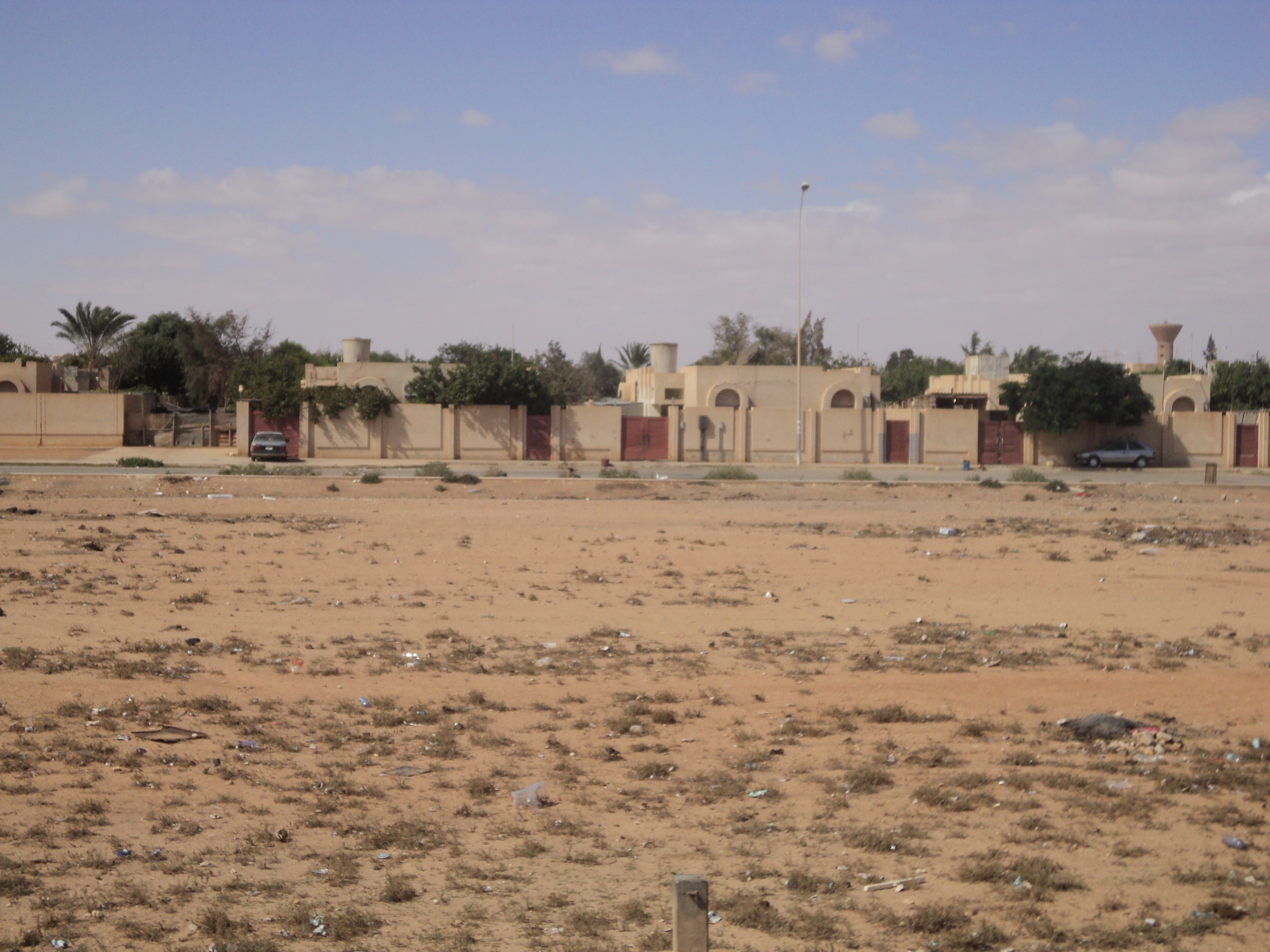

- Location in Libya
- Coordinates: 32°26′45″N 23°04′24″E
- Country: Libya
- Region: Cyrenaica
- District: Derna

Population (1995)
  - Total: 3,020
- Time zone: UTC+2 (EET)

Bomba (Arabic: البمبة) is a village in eastern Libya on the Gulf of Bomba. It is located 61 km (38 mi) south of Derna.

Greek historian Herodotus said that Cyrene was founded in mid-7th century BC, when a group of Greek immigrants from Thera landed at the Gulf of Bomba, and stayed there for years, then, they moved to place of Cyrene, and then, founded it. Depending on an old myth, Battus moved, by the advice of the gods, to Libya, landed on the Gulf of Timimi (the same Gulf of Bomba), and then moved westwards and founded Cyrene.
