= First Barbary War =

War between United States and the Barbary states, 1801–1805

- Part of the Barbary Wars
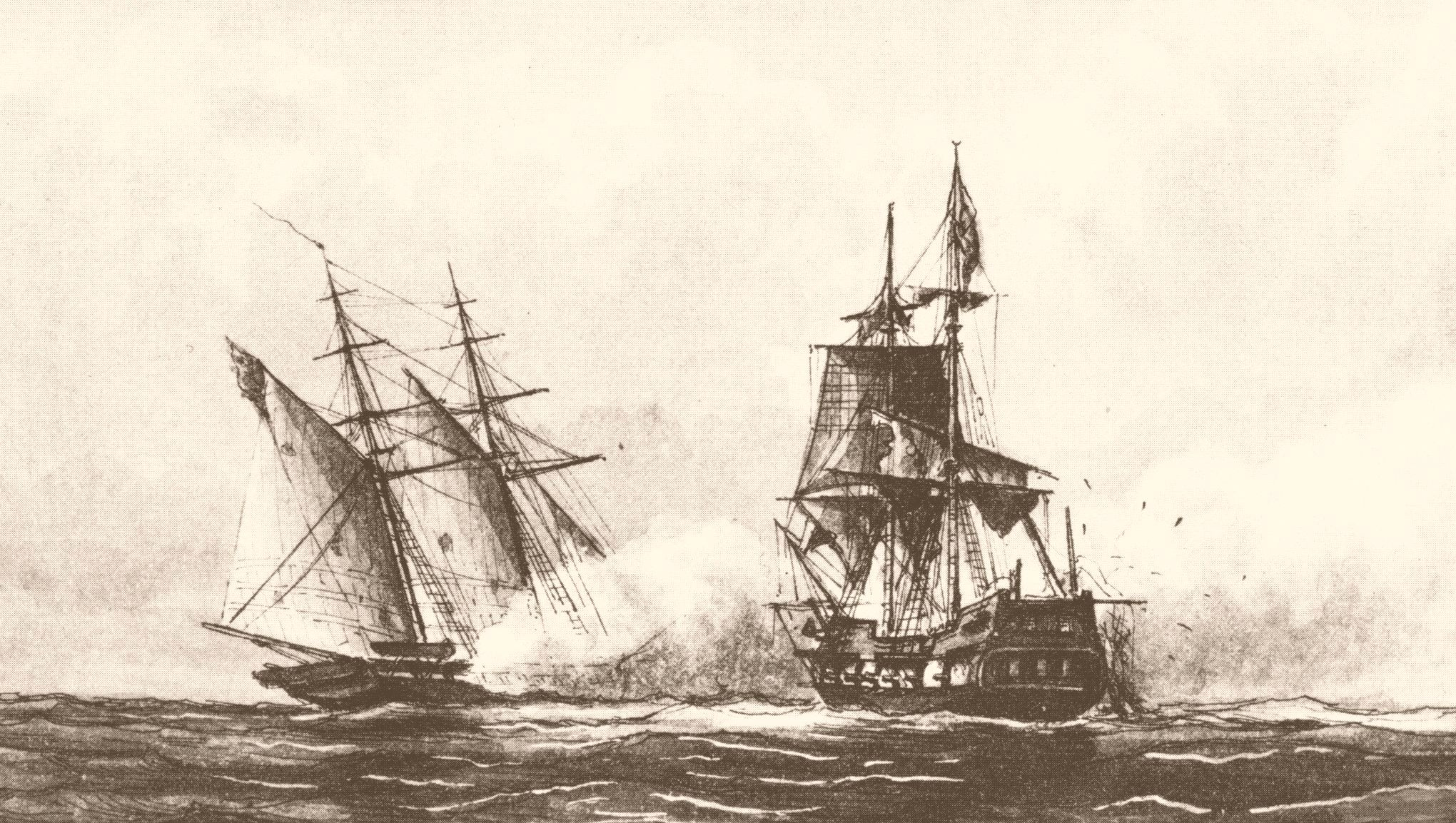
- USS Enterprise fighting the Tripolitan polacca Tripoli by William Bainbridge Hoff, 1878
Date	May 10, 1801 – June 4, 1805 (4 years and 1 month)
Location	Off the Mediterranean coast of Tripoli; Derna
Result	Peace Treaty

Belligerents
United States; Sweden; Sicily	Ottoman Tripolitania; Morocco (June to September 1802)

Commanders and leaders
(United States) Thomas Jefferson (United States) Richard Dale (United States) Richard Morris (United States) William Eaton (United States) Edward Preble (United States) Stephen Decatur (Sweden) Gustav IV Adolf (Sweden) Rudolf Cederström	(Ottoman Tripolitania) Yusuf Karamanli (Ottoman Tripolitania) Rais Mahomet Rous (Ottoman Tripolitania) Hassan Bey (Ottoman Tripolitania) Shadi Nazmi Reis

Strength
United States; First Squadron: 4 frigates 1 schooner Second Squadron: 6 frigates 1 schooner Third Squadron: 2 frigates 3 brigs 2 schooners 1 ketch Swedish Royal Navy: 3 frigates William Eaton's invasion: 9 US Marines, William Eaton, 3 midshipmen, and several civilians Approx. 500 Greek and Arab mercenaries	Various cruisers 11–20 gunboats 4,000 soldiers

The First Barbary War (1801–1805), also known as the Tripolitan War and the Barbary Coast War, was a conflict during the 1801–1815 Barbary Wars, in which the United States fought against Ottoman Tripolitania. Tripolitania had declared war against the United States over disputes regarding tributary payments in exchange for a cessation of Tripolitanian commerce raiding at sea. United States president Thomas Jefferson refused to pay this tribute. The First Barbary War was the first major American war fought outside the New World, and in the Arab world, besides the American–Algerian War (1785–1795).

== Background and overview ==
Barbary corsairs and crews from the quasi-independent North African Ottoman regencies of Algiers, Tunis, Tripoli, and the independent Sultanate of Morocco under the Alaouite dynasty (the Barbary Coast) utilized their naval forces for centuries across the Mediterranean. The capture of merchant ships, and enslavement and ransoming of their crews provided them with a source of wealth and naval power.

European responses included creation of the Trinitarian Order, (or order of "Mathurins") which operated from France for centuries with the special mission of collecting and disbursing funds for the relief and ransom of prisoners taken by Mediterranean pirates.

Beginning in the late 18th century, Barbary corsairs began attacks on American merchant shipping in an attempt to extort ransom for the lives of captured sailors, and ultimately tribute from the United States to avoid further attacks, as they had with the various European states.

Prior to signing of the Treaty of Paris, which formalized the United States' independence from Great Britain, American shipping was protected by France during the revolutionary years under the Treaty of Alliance (1778–83). Although the treaty did not mention the Barbary states in name, it referred to common enemies of both nations. Once the war concluded, piracy against America shipping began when the United States government lost its protection under the Treaty.

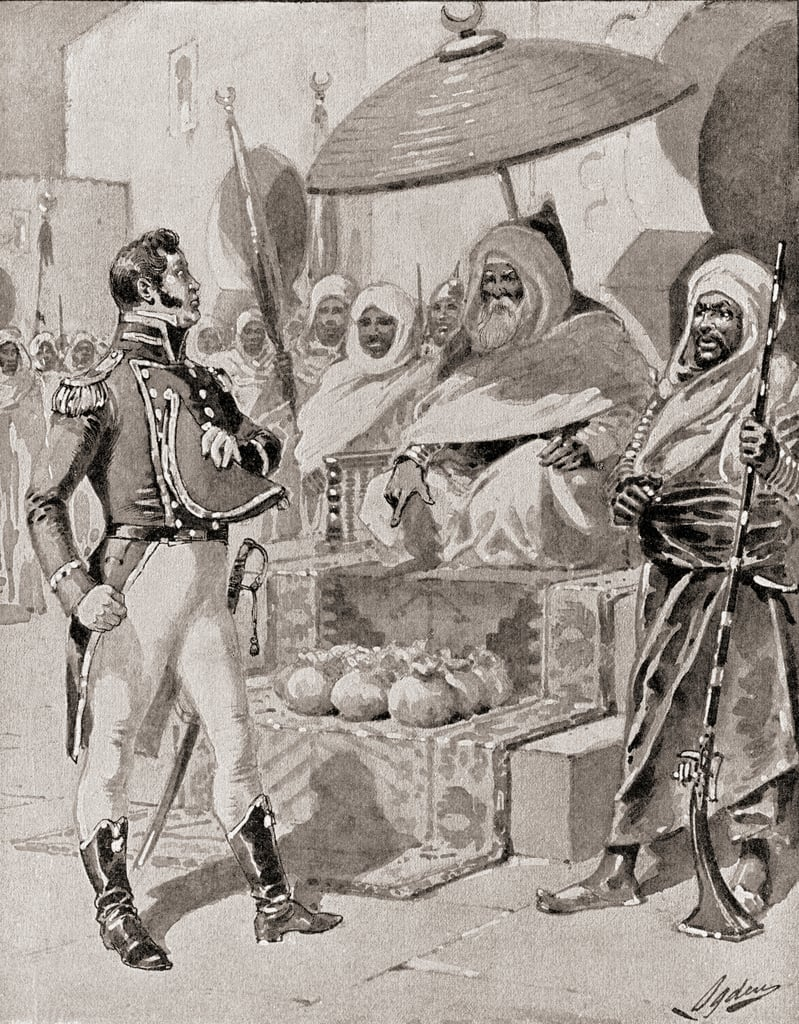
Captain William Bainbridge paying tribute to the Dey of Algiers, 1800

This lapse of protection by a European power led to the first American merchant ship being seized after the Treaty of Paris. On 11 October 1784, Moroccan pirates seized the brigantine Betsey. The Spanish government negotiated the freedom of the captured ship and crew; however, Spain advised the United States to offer tribute to prevent further attacks against merchant ships. The United States Minister to France, Thomas Jefferson, decided to send envoys to Morocco and Algeria to try to purchase treaties and the freedom of the captured sailors held by Algeria. Morocco was the first Barbary Coast state to sign a treaty with the United States, on 23 June 1786. This treaty formally ended all Moroccan piracy against American shipping interests. Specifically, article six of the treaty states that if any Americans captured by Moroccans or other Barbary Coast states docked at a Moroccan city, they would be set free and come under the protection of Morocco.

American diplomatic action with Algeria, the other major Barbary Coast state, was much less productive than with Morocco. Algeria began piracy against the United States on 25 July 1785 with the capture of the schooner Maria, and Dauphin a week later. All four Barbary Coast states demanded $660,000 each (equivalent to $16 million in 2025). However, the envoys were given only an allocated budget of $40,000 (equivalent to $980,000 in 2025) to achieve peace. Diplomatic talks to reach a reasonable sum for tribute or for the ransom of the captured sailors struggled to make any headway. The crews of Maria and Dauphin remained enslaved for over a decade, joined by crews of other ships captured by the Barbary states.

In March 1786, Jefferson and John Adams went to London to negotiate with Tripoli's envoy, ambassador Sidi Haji Abdrahaman (or Sidi Haji Abdul Rahman Adja). When they enquired "concerning the ground of the pretensions to make war upon nations who had done them no injury", the ambassador replied:

It was written in their Koran, that all nations which had not acknowledged the Prophet were sinners, whom it was the right and duty of the faithful to plunder and enslave; and that every mussulman who was slain in this warfare was sure to go to paradise. He said, also, that the man who was the first to board a vessel had one slave over and above his share, and that when they sprang to the deck of an enemy's ship, every sailor held a dagger in each hand and a third in his mouth; which usually struck such terror into the foe that they cried out for quarter at once. (Note: "American Peace Commissioners to John Jay," March 28, 1786, "Thomas Jefferson Papers," Series 1. General Correspondence. 1651–1827, Library of Congress. LoC: March 28, 1786 (handwritten).^ Philip Gengembre Hubert (1872). Making of America Project. The Atlantic Monthly, Atlantic Monthly Co. p. 413. Some sources confirm this wording, some other sources report this quotation with slight differences in wording.)

Jefferson reported the conversation to Secretary of Foreign Affairs John Jay, who submitted the ambassador's comments and offer to Congress. The incident convinced Jefferson that paying further tribute would do nothing to prevent more attacks. Although Adams agreed with Jefferson, he believed that circumstances forced the United States to pay tribute; the United States had just fought an exhausting war, which put the nation deep into debt and unable to finance the establishment of a navy.

Various letters and testimonies by captured sailors described their time in captivity. Barbary Coast imprisonment was different from that practiced by the United States and the European powers of the time. Prisoners were able to obtain wealth and property, along with achieving status beyond that of a slave. One such example was James Leander Cathcart, who rose to the highest position a Christian slave could achieve in Algeria, becoming an adviser to the dey (governor). Even so, most captives could expect little more than lives of hard labor and abuse, and struggled under extremely poor conditions that exposed them to vermin and disease. As word of their treatment reached the United States, through freed captives' narratives and letters, Americans pushed for Congress to take military action against the Barbary states.

On 19 July 1794, Congress appropriated $800,000 (equivalent to $17 million in 2025) for the release of American prisoners and for a peace treaty with Algiers, Tunis, and Tripoli. On 5 September 1795, American negotiator Joseph Donaldson signed a peace treaty with the dey of Algiers that included an upfront payment of $642,500 in specie (silver coinage, equivalent to $12 million in 2025) for peace, the release of American captives, various expenses for their care, and various gifts for the dey's royal court and family. An additional indefinite yearly tribute of $21,600 (equivalent to $410,000 in 2025) in shipbuilding supplies and ammunition would be given to the dey. The treaty, designed to prevent further piracy, resulted in the release of 115 American sailors held captive by the dey.

Jefferson continued to argue for cessation of the tribute, with rising support from President George Washington and others. With the recommissioning of the United States Navy in 1794 and a rush of new ships and weapons, it became increasingly possible for America to cease payments, although the established habit was difficult to change. The continuing demand for tribute ultimately led to the formation of the United States Department of the Navy, founded in 1798 to prevent further attacks upon American shipping while resolving the issue of Barbary piracy. Federalist and Anti-Federalist forces argued over the needs of the country and the burden of taxation. Jefferson's own Democratic-Republicans and anti-navalists believed that the future of the country lay in westward expansion, arguing that the Atlantic trade threatened to siphon money and energy away from the nation while entangling it in the wars and intrigue of the Old World. During the divisive 1800 presidential election, Jefferson defeated incumbent president John Adams. Jefferson was poised to order naval actions against the Barbary states.

== Declaration of war and naval blockade ==
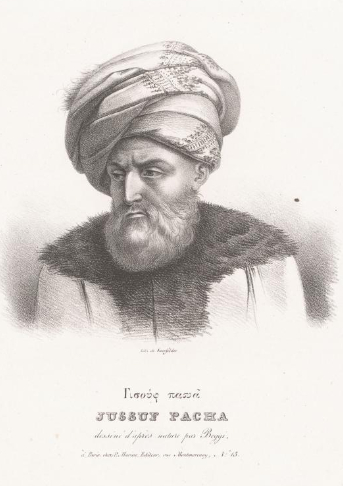
Portrait of Yusuf Karamanli

Just before Jefferson's inauguration in March 1801, Congress passed naval legislation that, among other things, provided for six frigates that "shall be officered and manned as the President of the United States may direct." In the event of a declaration of war on the United States by the Barbary powers, these ships were to "protect our commerce and chastise their insolence—by sinking, burning or destroying their ships and vessels wherever you shall find them." On Jefferson's inauguration, Yusuf Karamanli, the Pasha (or Bashaw) of Tripoli, demanded $225,000 (equivalent to $4.4 million in 2025) from the United States. It was a long-standing tradition that if a government was changed or the consular was changed, said government would have to pay 'consular' gifts, in either gold or in goods, usually military and naval stores. (In 1800, federal revenues totaled a little over $10 million, equivalent to $190 million in 2025.) Finally able to put his long-held beliefs into practice, Jefferson refused the demand. Consequently—along with the Americans not paying the money nor the gifts as stated in the Treaty of Tripoli signed in 1796 between Tripoli and America— on 10 May 1801, Karamanli declared war on the United States, not through any formal written documents but in the customary Barbary manner of cutting down the flagstaff in front of the United States Consulate. Algiers and Tunis did not follow suit.

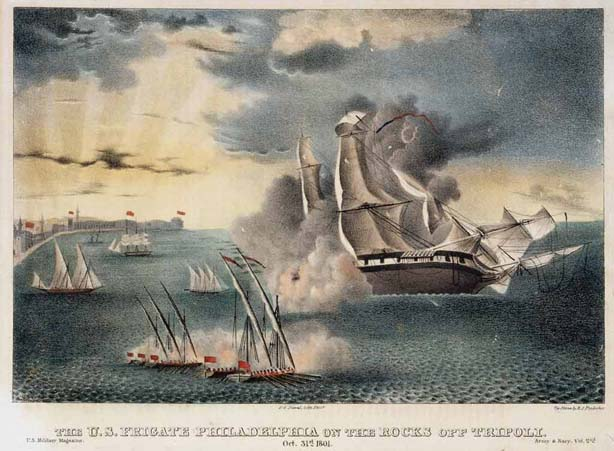
An artist's depiction of the Philadelphia aground off Tripoli, in October 1803

Before learning that Tripoli had declared war, Jefferson sent a small squadron consisting of three frigates and one schooner, under the command of Commodore Richard Dale, with gifts and letters to attempt to maintain peace with the Barbary powers. However, if war had been declared, then Dale was instructed to "protect American ships and citizens against potential aggression"; Jefferson made it clear that he was "unauthorized by the constitution, without the sanction of Congress, to go beyond the line of defense." He told Congress: "I communicate [to you] all material information on this subject, that in the exercise of this important function confided by the constitution to the legislature exclusively their judgment may form itself on a knowledge and consideration of every circumstance of weight." Although Congress never voted on a formal declaration of war, it authorized the president to instruct the commanders of armed American vessels to seize all vessels and goods of the Pasha of Tripoli "and also to cause to be done all such other acts of precaution or hostility as the state of war will justify." The American squadron joined a Swedish squadron under Counter-admiral Rudolf Cederström in blockading Tripoli, the Swedes having been at war with the Tripolitans since 1800.

On 31 May 1801, Dale's successor, Commodore Edward Preble, traveled to Messina, Sicily, to the court of King Ferdinand IV of the Kingdom of Naples. The kingdom was at war with Napoleon, but Ferdinand saw an opportunity and supplied the Americans with manpower, craftsmen, supplies, gunboats, mortar boats, and the ports of Messina, Syracuse, and Palermo to be used as naval bases for launching operations against Tripoli. Tripoli was a fortress city protected by 150 pieces of heavy artillery and manned by 25,000 soldiers, assisted by a fleet of 10 ten-gunned brigs, 2 eight-gun schooners, two large galleys, and 19 gunboats.

The first action of the campaign took place on 1 August 1801, when the armed schooner Enterprise (commanded by Lieutenant Andrew Sterret) defeated the 14-gun Tripolitan corsair Tripoli in battle.

In 1802, in response to Jefferson's request for a formal authorization of anti-piracy efforts, Congress passed "An act for the protection of commerce and seamen of the United States against the Tripolitan cruisers", authorizing the president to "employ such of the armed vessels of the United States as may be judged requisite... for protecting effectually the commerce and seamen thereof on the Atlantic Ocean, the Mediterranean and adjoining seas." The statute authorized American ships to seize vessels belonging to the pasha of Tripoli, with the captured property distributed to those who brought the vessels into port.

The United States Navy went unchallenged on the sea, but the question of how far to push the conflict remained. Jefferson pressed the issue the following year, with an increase in military force and deployment of many of the Navy's best ships to the region throughout 1802. USS Argus, Chesapeake, Constellation, USS Constitution, Enterprise, Intrepid, Philadelphia, Vixen, President, Congress, Essex, John Adams, Nautilus, Scourge, Syren, and Hornet (joined in 1805) all saw service during the war, under the overall command of Preble. Throughout 1803, Preble set up and maintained a blockade of the Barbary ports while taking action to seize and harass their fleets.

== Battles ==
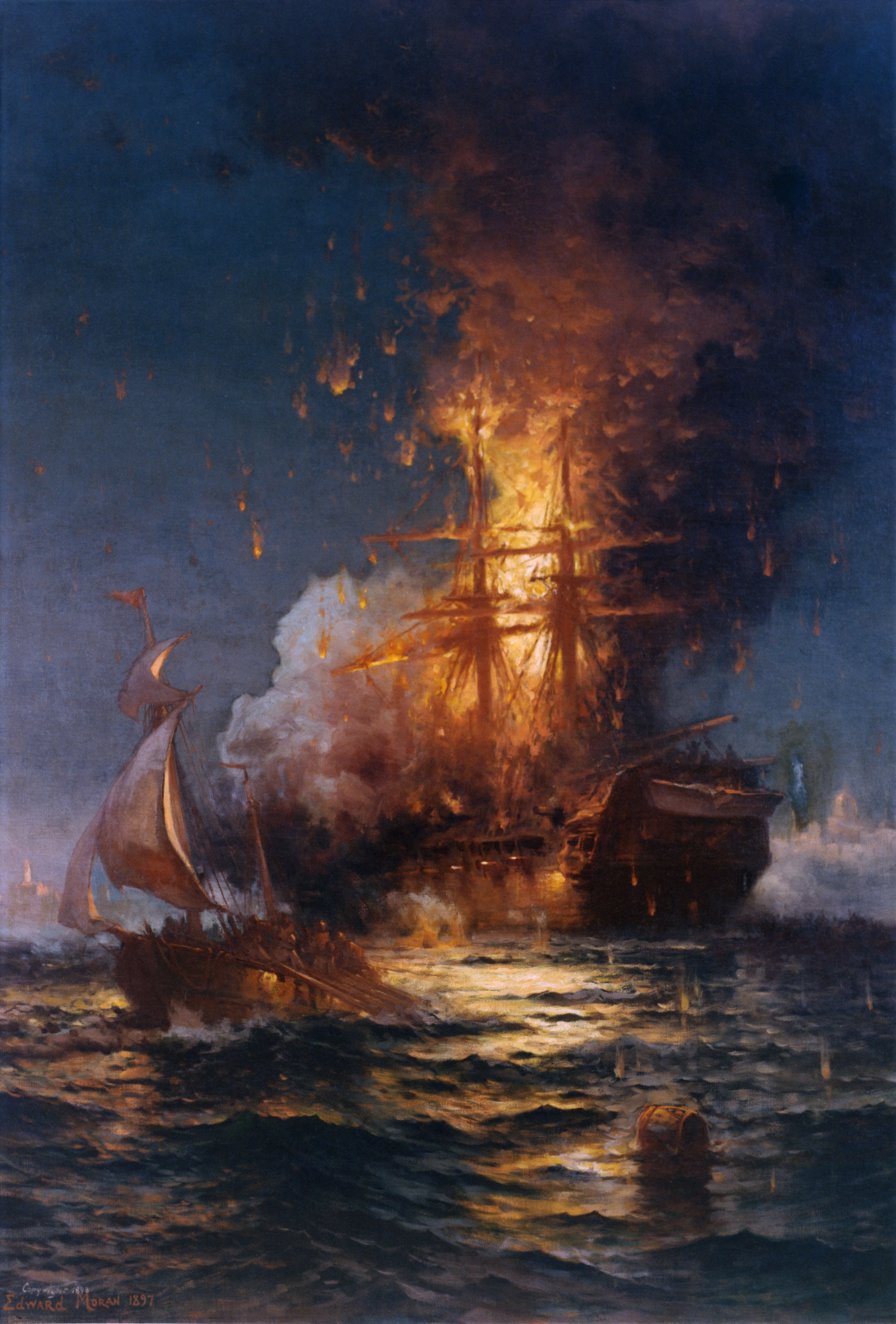
An 1897 painting of the burning of the USS Philadelphia

In October 1803, Tripoli's fleet captured the USS Philadelphia intact after the frigate ran aground on a reef while patrolling Tripoli harbor. Efforts by the Americans to refloat the ship while under fire from shore batteries and Tripolitan naval units failed. The ship, her captain William Bainbridge, and all officers and crew were taken ashore and held as hostages. Philadelphia was subsequently converted into a floating battery for harbor defense.

On the night of 16 February 1804, Captain Stephen Decatur led a small detachment of United States Marines aboard the captured Tripolitan ketch rechristened Intrepid, thus deceiving the guards on Philadelphia to float close enough to board her. Decatur's men stormed the ship and overpowered the Tripolitan sailors. With fire support from American warships, the Marines set fire to Philadelphia and destroyed her.

Preble attacked Tripoli on 14 July 1804, kicking off a series of inconclusive battles, including an unsuccessful attempt to use Intrepid under Captain Richard Somers as a fire ship, packed with explosives and sent to enter Tripoli harbor. Intrepid was destroyed, possibly by enemy gunfire, before she achieved her goal, killing Somers and his entire crew of 12.

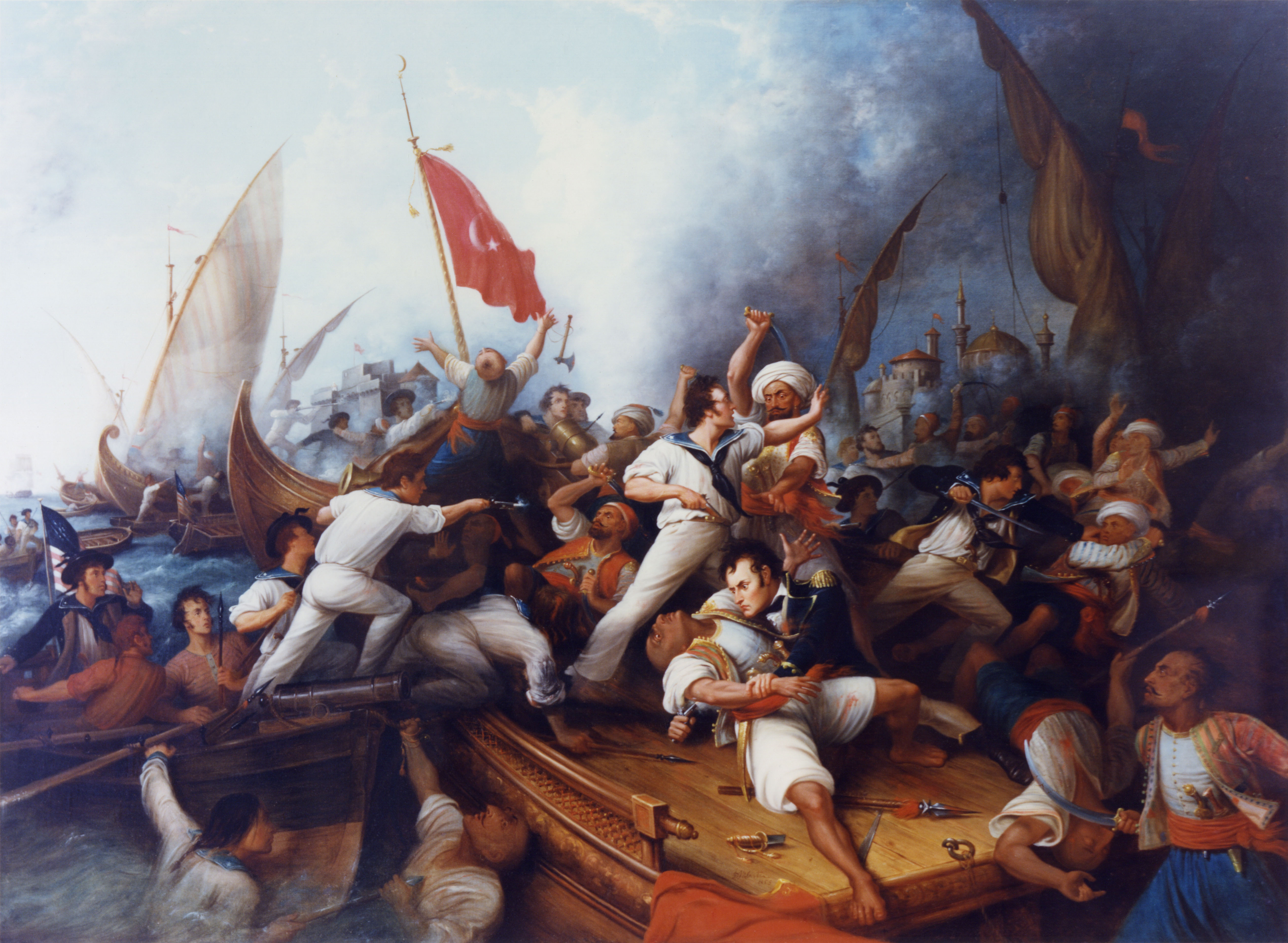
A painting of Stephen Decatur boarding a Tripolitan gunboat during a naval engagement, 3 August 1804

The turning point in the war was the Battle of Derna (April–May 1805). Ex-consul William Eaton, a former Army captain who used the title of "general", and Marine Corps 1st Lieutenant Presley O'Bannon led a force of eight Marines and 500 mercenaries—Greeks from Crete, Arabs, and Berbers—on a march across the desert from Alexandria, Egypt, to capture the Tripolitan city of Derna. This was the first time the United States flag was raised in victory on foreign soil. The action is memorialized in a line of the Marines' Hymn—"the shores of Tripoli". The capturing of the city gave American negotiators leverage in securing the return of hostages and the end of the war.

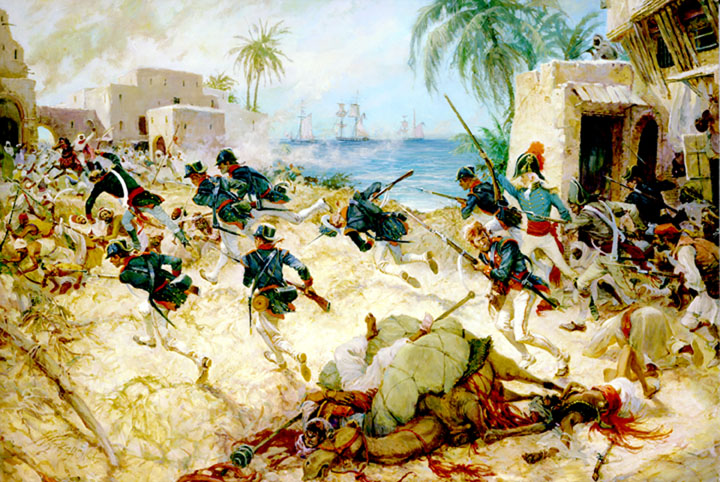
A painting of Lieutenant Presley O'Bannon at Derna, April 1805

== Peace treaty and aftermath ==
Wearied of the blockade and raids, and now under threat of a continued advance on Tripoli proper and a scheme to restore his deposed older brother Hamet Karamanli as ruler, Yusuf Karamanli signed the Treaty of Tripoli ending hostilities on 10 June 1805. Article 2 of the treaty reads:

The Bashaw of Tripoli shall deliver up to the American squadron now off Tripoli, all the Americans in his possession; and all the subjects of the Bashaw of Tripoli now in the power of the United States of America shall be delivered up to him; and as the number of Americans in possession of the Bashaw of Tripoli amounts to three hundred persons, more or less; and the number of Tripolino subjects in the power of the Americans to about, one hundred more or less; The Bashaw of Tripoli shall receive from the United States of America, the sum of sixty thousand dollars, as a payment for the difference between the prisoners herein mentioned.

In agreeing to pay a ransom of $60,000 (equivalent to $1.3 million in 2025) for the American prisoners, the Jefferson administration drew a distinction between paying tribute and paying ransom. At the time, some argued that buying sailors out of slavery was a fair exchange to end the war. Eaton, however, remained bitter for the rest of his life about the treaty, feeling that his efforts had been squandered by the American emissary from the United States Department of State, diplomat Tobias Lear. Eaton and others felt that the capture of Derna should have been used as a bargaining chip to obtain the release of all American prisoners without having to pay ransom. Furthermore, Eaton believed the honor of the United States had been compromised when it abandoned Hamet Karamanli after promising to restore him as leader of Tripoli. Eaton's complaints generally went unheard, especially as attention turned to the strained international relations which would ultimately lead to the withdrawal of the United States Navy from the area in 1807 and to the War of 1812.

The outcome of the war is a matter of dispute among historians. Many historians view the war as an American victory. But some historians claim that the war was inconclusive or was a long-term success for Tripoli. The First Barbary War was beneficial to the reputation of the United States' military command and war mechanism, which had been up to that time relatively untested. The First Barbary War showed that the United States could execute a war far from home, and that American forces had the cohesion to fight together as Americans rather than separately as Georgians, New Yorkers, etc. The United States Navy and United States Marine Corps became a permanent part of the United States government and United States history, and Decatur returned to the United States as its first post-revolutionary war hero.

However, the more immediate problem of Barbary piracy was not fully settled. By 1807, Algiers had reassembled its fleets and resumed taking American ships and seamen hostage. Distracted by the preludes to the War of 1812, the United States was unable to respond to the provocation until 1815, with the Second Barbary War, in which naval victories by Commodores William Bainbridge and Stephen Decatur led to treaties ending all tribute payments by the United States.

== Monument ==
The Tripoli Monument, the oldest military monument in the United States, honors the American heroes of the First Barbary War: Somers (by then promoted to the rank of master commandant), Lieutenant James Caldwell, James Decatur (brother of Stephen Decatur), Henry Wadsworth, Joseph Israel and John Dorsey. Originally known as the Naval Monument, it was carved of Carrara marble in Italy in 1806 and brought to the United States on board Constitution ("Old Ironsides"). From its original location in the Washington Navy Yard, it was moved to the west terrace of the national Capitol and finally, in 1860, to the United States Naval Academy in Annapolis, Maryland.

== See also ==
- Barbary treaties
- Islamic views on slavery
- Military history of the United States
- Slavery in the Ottoman Empire
- Capture of Manuel Briones

== Bibliography ==
- Farber, Hannah (2014), "Millions for Credit: Peace with Algiers and the Establishment of America's Commercial Reputation Overseas, 1795–96.", Journal of the Early Republic, 34 (2): 187–217, doi:10.1353/jer.2014.0028, S2CID 154186346
- Keynes, Edward (2004), Undeclared War, Penn State Press, ISBN 978-0-271-02607-7
- Kilmeade, Brian; Yaeger, Don (2015), Thomas Jefferson And The Tripoli Pirates, New York: Sentinel, ISBN 978-1-59184-806-6
- London, Joshua E. (2005), Victory in Tripoli: How America's War with the Barbary Pirates Established the U.S. Navy and Shaped a Nation, New Jersey: John Wiley & Sons, Inc., ISBN 0-471-44415-4
- Whipple, A. B. C. (1991), To the Shores of Tripoli: The Birth of the U.S. Navy and Marines, Bluejacket Books, ISBN 1-55750-966-2
