= List of treaties of the Ottoman Empire =

Below is a list of major treaties of the Ottoman Empire.

Year	Name	Main signatories (other than the Ottoman Empire)
1403	Treaty of Gallipoli	Byzantine Empire and Republic of Venice
1411	Treaty of Selymbria	Republic of Venice
1419	Ottoman–Venetian	Republic of Venice
1444	Szeged and Edirne	Hungary
1454	Constantinople (1454)	Republic of Venice
1479	Constantinople (1479)	Republic of Venice
1533	Constantinople (1533)	Holy Roman Empire
1536	Franco-Turkish	France
1547	Adrianople (1547)	Holy Roman Empire
1555	Amasya	Safavid dynasty
1568	Adrianople (1568)	Holy Roman Empire
1590	Constantinople (1590)	Safavid dynasty
1606	Zitvatorok	Holy Roman Empire
1612	Nasuh Pasha	Safavid dynasty
1617	Busza	Polish–Lithuanian Commonwealth
1618	Serav	Safavid dynasty
1621	Khotyn	Polish–Lithuanian Commonwealth
1639	Zuhab (Kasr'ı Şirin)	Safavid dynasty
1664	Vasvar	Polish–Lithuanian Commonwealth
1672	Buczacs	Polish–Lithuanian Commonwealth
1676	Żurawno (İzvença)	Polish–Lithuanian Commonwealth
1681	Bakhchisarai	Russian Empire
1699	Karlowitz	Holy Roman Empire, Polish–Lithuanian Commonwealth, Republic of Venice
1700	Constantinople (1700)	Russian Empire
1711	Pruth	Russian Empire
1718	Passarowitz	Holy Roman Empire, Republic of Venice
1724	Constantinople (1724)	Russian Empire
1732	Ahmet Pasha	Safavid dynasty
1736	Constantinople (1736)	Afsharid dynasty
1739	Belgrade	Habsburg monarchy
1739	Niš (1739)	Russian Empire
1746	Kerden	Afsharid dynasty
1774	Küçük Kaynarca	Russian Empire
1779	Aynalıkavak	Russian Empire
1791	Sistova	Holy Roman Empire
1792	Jassy	Russian Empire
1795	Algeria	United States
1796	Tripoli	United States
1797	Tunis (1797)	United States
1800	El Arish	France
1802	Paris (1802)	France
1805	Tripoli (1805)	United States
1807	Ičko's Peace	Revolutionary Serbia
1809	Kale'i Sültaniye (Dardanelles)	United Kingdom
1812	Bucharest (1812)	Russian Empire
1815	Algiers (1815)	United States
1823	Erzurum (1823)	Qajar dynasty
1824	Tunis (1824)	United States
1826	Akkerman	Russian Empire
1828	Adrianople (1829)	Russian Empire
1832	Constantinople (1832)	United Kingdom, France, Russian Empire
1833	Hünkâr İskelesi	Russian Empire
1833	Kütahya	Egypt (nominal vassal of the Ottoman Empire)
1838	Balta Liman	United Kingdom
1840	London (1840)	United Kingdom, Russian Empire, Germany, Austria-Hungary
1841	London Straits Convention	United Kingdom, Russian Empire, France, Germany, Austria-Hungary
1847	Erzurum (1847)	Qajar dynasty
1856	Paris (1856)	Russian Empire, United Kingdom, France, Kingdom of Sardinia
1862	Shkodër	Montenegro (nominal vassal of Ottoman Empire)
1878	San Stefano	Russian Empire
1878	Berlin (1878)	Russian Empire
1878	Cyprus	United Kingdom
1881	Convention of Constantinople	Greece
1886	Tophane	Bulgaria
1897	Constantinople (1897)	Greece
1911	Daane	Yemen
1912	Ouchy	Italy
1913	London (1913)	Balkan League (Serbia, Montenegro, Bulgaria, Greece)
1913	Constantinople (1913)	Bulgaria
1913	Athens	Greece
1913	Anglo-Ottoman (1913)	United Kingdom
1914	Yeniköy accord (Armenian reforms), (1914)	Western Armenia
1917	Erzincan	Russian SFSR
1918	Brest Litovsk	Russian SFSR, Germany, Austria-Hungary
1918	Trabzon	Transcaucasian Sejm
1918	Batum	Armenia
1918	Mudros	United Kingdom
1920	Sèvres	Allies (United Kingdom, France, Italy, and others)

== See also ==
- List of treaties of Turkey
