= Barbary treaties =

The Barbary Treaties refer to several treaties between the United States and the semi-autonomous North African regencies of Algiers, Tunis, and Tripoli, under the rule of the Ottoman Empire, known collectively as the Barbary Coast.

- Treaty with Algiers (1795)
- Treaty with Tripoli (1796)
- Treaty with Tunis (1797)
- Treaty with Tripoli (1805)
- Treaty with Algiers (1815)
- Treaty with Tunis (1824)
- Treaty with Morocco (1836)

== See also ==
- Barbary pirates
- First Barbary War
- Second Barbary War
- Barbary Coast
