= Afsharid Iran =

Iran under Afsharid dynasty from 1736 to 1796

Guarded Domains of Iran ممالک محروسه ایران (Persian) Mamâlek-e Mahruse-ye Irân
- 1736–1796
- Imperial standards Emblem

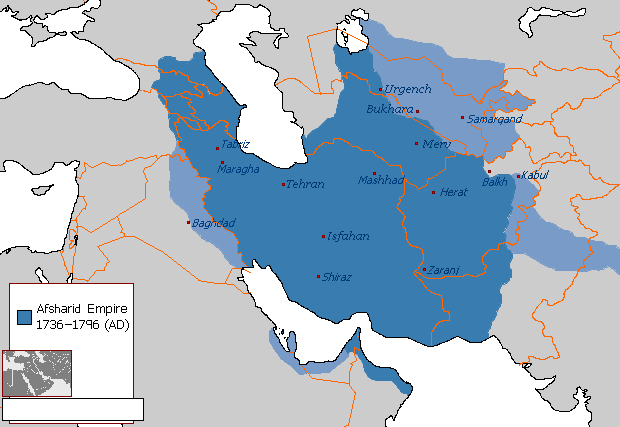
- The Afsharid Empire at its greatest extent in 1741–1745 under Nader Shah
- Status: Empire
- Capital: Mashhad
- Official languages: Persian (court language/literature; civil & fiscal administration)
- Common languages: Oghuz Turkic (court language)
- Religion: Islam (state religion); Christianity; Zoroastrianism; Judaism
- Government: Absolute monarchy
- King of Kings
  - 1736–1747: Nader Shah
  - 1747–1748: Adel Shah
  - 1748: Ebrahim Afshar
  - 1748–1796: Shahrokh Shah
- History
  - Established: 22 January 1736
  - Disestablished: 1796

Population
  - 1736-1747 After 1747 estimate: 9,000,000; 6,000,000
- Currency: Toman
- ISO 3166 code: IR
Preceded by
Safavid Iran
Hotak Empire
Mughal Empire
Khanate of Kalat
Succeeded by
Zand Iran
Qajar Iran
Kingdom of Kartli-Kakheti
Durrani Empire
Khanate of Kalat

The Guarded Domains of Iran, commonly referred to as Afsharid Iran, (Note: Persian: ایران افشاری) Afsharid Persia or the Afsharid Empire, was an Iranian empire established by the Turkoman Afshar tribe in Iran's north-eastern province of Khorasan, the Afsharid dynasty would rule over Iran during the mid 18th century. The dynasty's founder, Nader Shah, was a successful military commander who deposed the last member of the Safavid dynasty in 1736, and proclaimed himself Shah.

During Nader Shah's reign, Iran reached its greatest extent since the time of the Sasanian Empire. At its height it ruled modern-day Iran, the Caucasus, Afghanistan, Uzbekistan and other parts of Central Asia, as well as parts of Arabia, the Indian subcontinent, Iraq and Turkey. After his death, most of his empire was divided between the Zands, Durranis, and Khanate of Kalat, with Afsharid rule being confined to a small local state in Khorasan. The Afsharid dynasty was finally overthrown in 1796 by Agha Mohammad Khan Qajar, who founded the Qajar Empire and reestablished Iranian suzerainty over the previously lost regions.

The dynasty was named after the Turkoman Afshar tribe of Khorasan in north-eastern Iran, to which Nader Shah belonged. The Afshars had originally migrated from Turkestan to Azerbaijan (Iranian Azerbaijan) in the 13th century. In the early 17th century, Abbas the Great moved many Afshars from Azerbaijan to Khorasan to defend the north-eastern borders of the state against the Uzbeks, after which the Afshars settled in those regions. Nader Shah belonged to the Qereqlu branch of the Afshars.

== Name ==
Since the Safavid era, Mamâlek-e Mahruse-ye Irân (Guarded Domains of Iran) was the common and official name of Iran. The idea of the Guarded Domains illustrated a feeling of territorial and political uniformity in a society where the Persian language, culture, monarchy, and Shia Islam became integral elements of the developing national identity. The concept presumably had started to form under the Mongol Ilkhanate in the late 13th-century, a period in which regional actions, trade, written culture, and partly Shia Islam, contributed to the establishment of the early modern Persianate world.

== History ==
=== Foundation of the dynasty ===
Nader Shah was born (as Nadr Qoli) into a humble semi-nomadic family from the Afshar tribe of Khorasan, where he became a local warlord. His path to power began when the Ghilzai Mahmud Hotak overthrew the weakened and disintegrated Safavid shah Soltan Hoseyn in 1722. At the same time, Ottoman and Russian forces seized Iranian land. Russia took swaths of Iran's Caucasian territories in the North Caucasus and Transcaucasia, as well as mainland northern Iran, by the Russo-Persian War, while the neighbouring Ottomans invaded from the west. By the 1724 Treaty of Constantinople, they agreed to divide the conquered areas between themselves.

On the other side of the theatre, Nader joined forces with Soltan Hoseyn's son Tahmasp II and led the resistance against the Ghilzai Afghans, driving their leader Ashraf Khan out of the capital in 1729 and establishing Tahmasp on the throne. Nader fought to regain the lands lost to the Ottomans and Russians and to restore Iranian hegemony in Iran. While he was away in the east fighting the Ghilzais, Tahmasp waged a disastrous campaign in the Caucasus which allowed the Ottomans to retake most of their lost territory in the west. Nader, displeased, had Tahmasp deposed in favour of his infant son Abbas III in 1732. Four years later, after he had recaptured most of the lost Iranian lands, Nader felt confident enough to have himself proclaimed shah in his own right at a ceremony on the Mughan plain.

Nader subsequently made the Russians cede the taken territories taken in 1722–23 through the Treaty of Resht of 1732 and the Treaty of Ganja of 1735. Back in control of the integral northern territories, and with a new Russo-Iranian alliance against the common Ottoman enemy, he continued the Ottoman–Persian War. The Ottoman armies were expelled from western Iran and the rest of the Caucasus, and the resultant 1736 Treaty of Constantinople forced the Ottomans to confirm Iranian suzerainty over the Caucasus and recognised Nader as the new Shah.

=== Conquests of Nader Shah and the succession problem ===
==== Fall of the Hotak Empire ====
Tahmasp and the Qajar leader Fath Ali Khan (the ancestor of Agha Mohammad Khan Qajar) contacted Nader and asked him to join their cause and drive the Ghilzai Afghans out of Khorasan. He agreed and thus became a figure of national importance. When Nader discovered that Fath Ali Khan was corresponding with Malek Mahmud and revealed this to the shah, Tahmasp executed him and made Nader the chief of his army instead. Nader subsequently took on the title Tahmasp Qoli (Servant of Tahmasp). In late 1726, Nader recaptured Mashhad.

Nader chose not to march directly on Isfahan. First, in May 1729, he defeated the Abdali Afghans near Herat. Many of the Abdali Afghans subsequently joined his army. The new shah of the Ghilzai Afghans, Ashraf, decided to move against Nader but in September 1729, Nader defeated him at the Battle of Damghan and again decisively in November at Murchakhort, banishing the Afghans from Iranian soil forever. Ashraf fled and Nader finally entered Isfahan, handing it over to Tahmasp in December and plundering the city to pay his army. Tahmasp made Nader governor over many of the eastern provinces, including his native Khorasan, and married him to his sister. Nader pursued and defeated Ashraf, who was murdered by his own followers. In 1738, Nader Shah besieged and destroyed the last Hotak seat of power, at Kandahar. He built a new city nearby, which he named "Naderabad".

==== First Ottoman campaign and the regain of the Caucasus ====
In the spring of 1735, Nader attacked Iran's archrival, the Ottomans, and regained most of the territory lost during the recent chaos. At the same time, the Abdali Afghans rebelled and besieged Mashhad, forcing Nader to suspend his campaign and save his brother, Ebrahim. It took Nader fourteen months to crush this uprising.

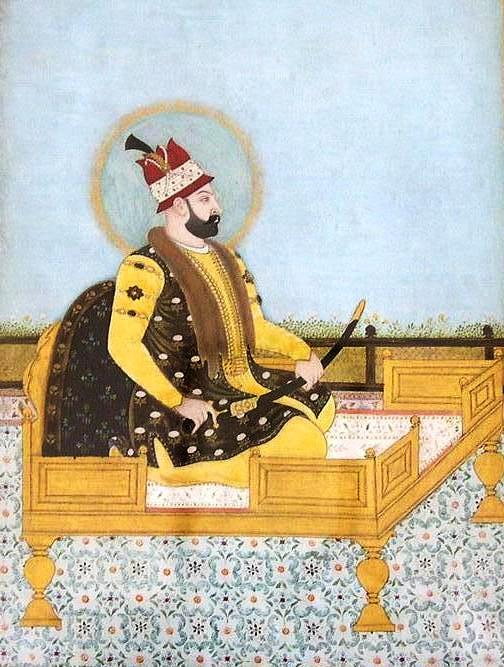
Painting of Nader Shah

Relations between Nader and the Shah had declined as the latter grew alarmed by his general's military successes. While Nader was absent in the east, Tahmasp tried to assert himself by launching a campaign to recapture Yerevan. He ended up losing all of Nader's recent gains to the Ottomans, and signed a treaty ceding Georgia and Armenia in exchange for Tabriz. Nader, furious, saw that the moment had come to depose Tahmasp. He denounced the treaty, seeking popular support for a war against the Ottomans. In Isfahan, Nader got Tahmasp drunk then showed him to the courtiers asking if a man in such a state was fit to rule. In 1732 he forced Tahmasp to abdicate in favour of the Shah's infant son, Abbas III, to whom Nader became regent.

Nader decided, as he continued the 1730–35 war, that he could win back the territory in Armenia and Georgia by seizing Ottoman Baghdad and then offering it in exchange for the lost provinces, but his plan went badly amiss when his army was routed by the Ottoman general Topal Osman Pasha near the city in 1733. Nader decided he needed to regain the initiative as soon as possible to save his position because revolts were already breaking out in Iran. He faced Topal again with a larger force and defeated and killed him. He then besieged Baghdad, as well as Ganja in the northern provinces, earning a Russian alliance against the Ottomans. Nader scored a decisive victory over a superior Ottoman force at Yeghevard (modern-day Armenia) and by the summer of 1735, Armenia and Georgia were under his rule. In March 1735, he signed a treaty with the Russians in Ganja by which the latter agreed to withdraw all of their troops from Iranian territory, those which had not been ceded back by the 1732 Treaty of Resht yet, mainly regarding Derbent, Baku, Tarki, and the surrounding lands, resulting in the reestablishment of Iranian rule over all of the Caucasus and northern mainland Iran again.

==== Nader becomes shah ====
Nader suggested to his closest intimates, after a hunting party on the Mughan plain (presently split between Azerbaijan and Iran), that he should be proclaimed the new shah in place of the young Abbas III. The small group of close intimates, Nader's friends, included Tahmasp Khan Jalayer and Hasan-Ali Beg Bestami. Following Nader's suggestion, the group did not "demur", and Hasan-Ali remained silent. When Nader asked him why he remained silent, Hasan-Ali replied that the best course of action for Nader would be to assemble all the leading men of the state, in order to receive their agreement in "a signed and sealed document of consent". Nader approved of the proposal, and the writers of the chancellery, which included the court historian Mirza Mehdi Khan Astarabadi, were instructed with sending out orders to the military, religious and nobility of the nation to summon at the plains. The summonses for the people to attend had gone out in November 1735, and they began arriving in January 1736. In the same month of January 1736, Nader held a qoroltai (a grand meeting in the tradition of Genghis Khan and Timur) on the Mughan plain. The Mughan plain was specifically chosen for its size and "abundance of fodder". Everyone agreed to the proposal of Nader becoming the new shah, many—if not most—enthusiastically, the rest fearing Nader's anger if they showed support for the deposed Safavids. Nader was crowned Shah of Iran on March 8, 1736, a date his astrologers had chosen as being especially propitious, in attendance of an "exceptionally large assembly" composed of the military, religious and nobility of the nation, as well as the Ottoman ambassador Ali Pasha.

==== Invasion of the Mughal Empire ====
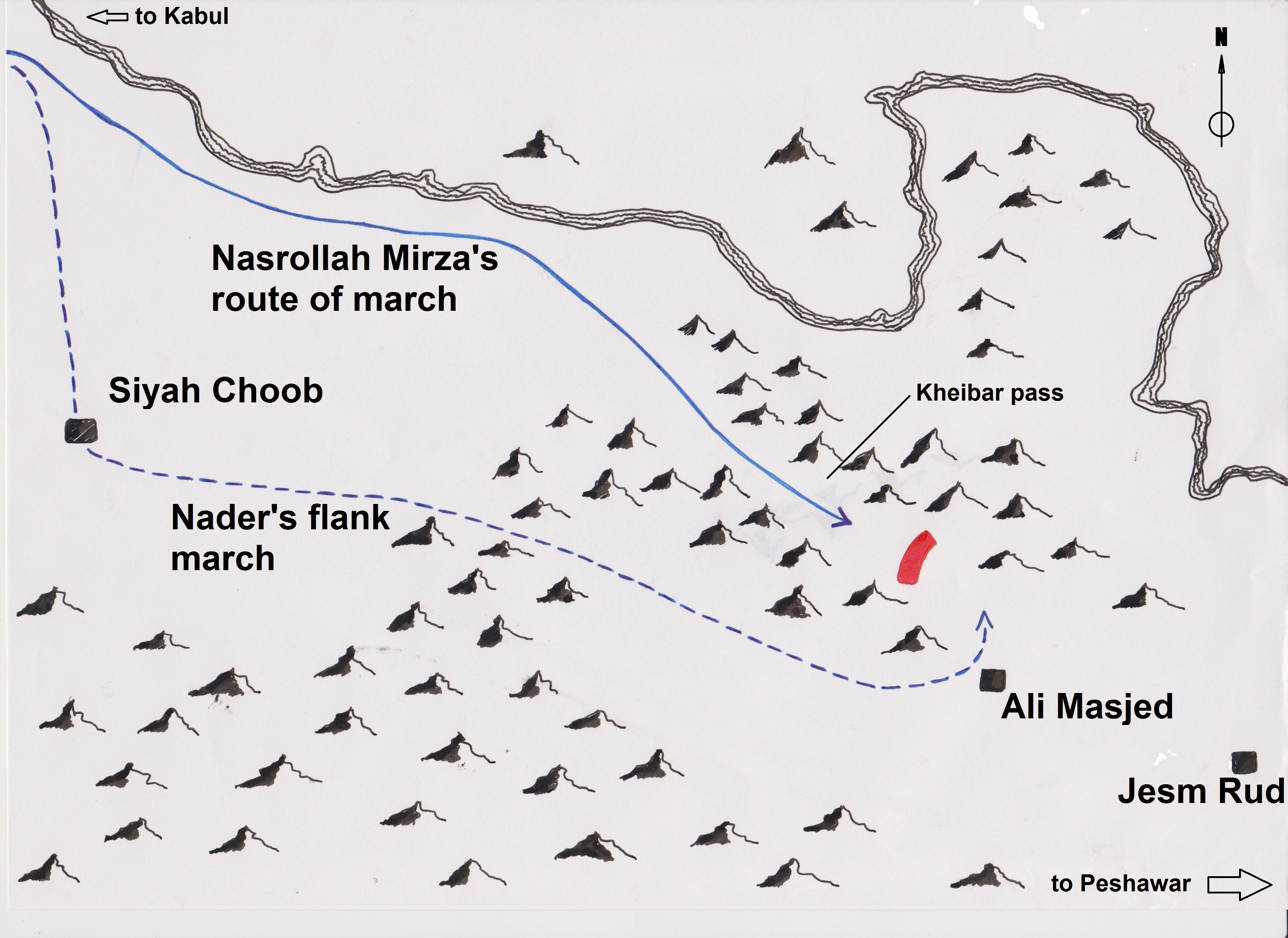
The flank march of Nader's army at Battle of Khyber pass has been called a "military masterpiece" by the Russian general & historian Kursinski

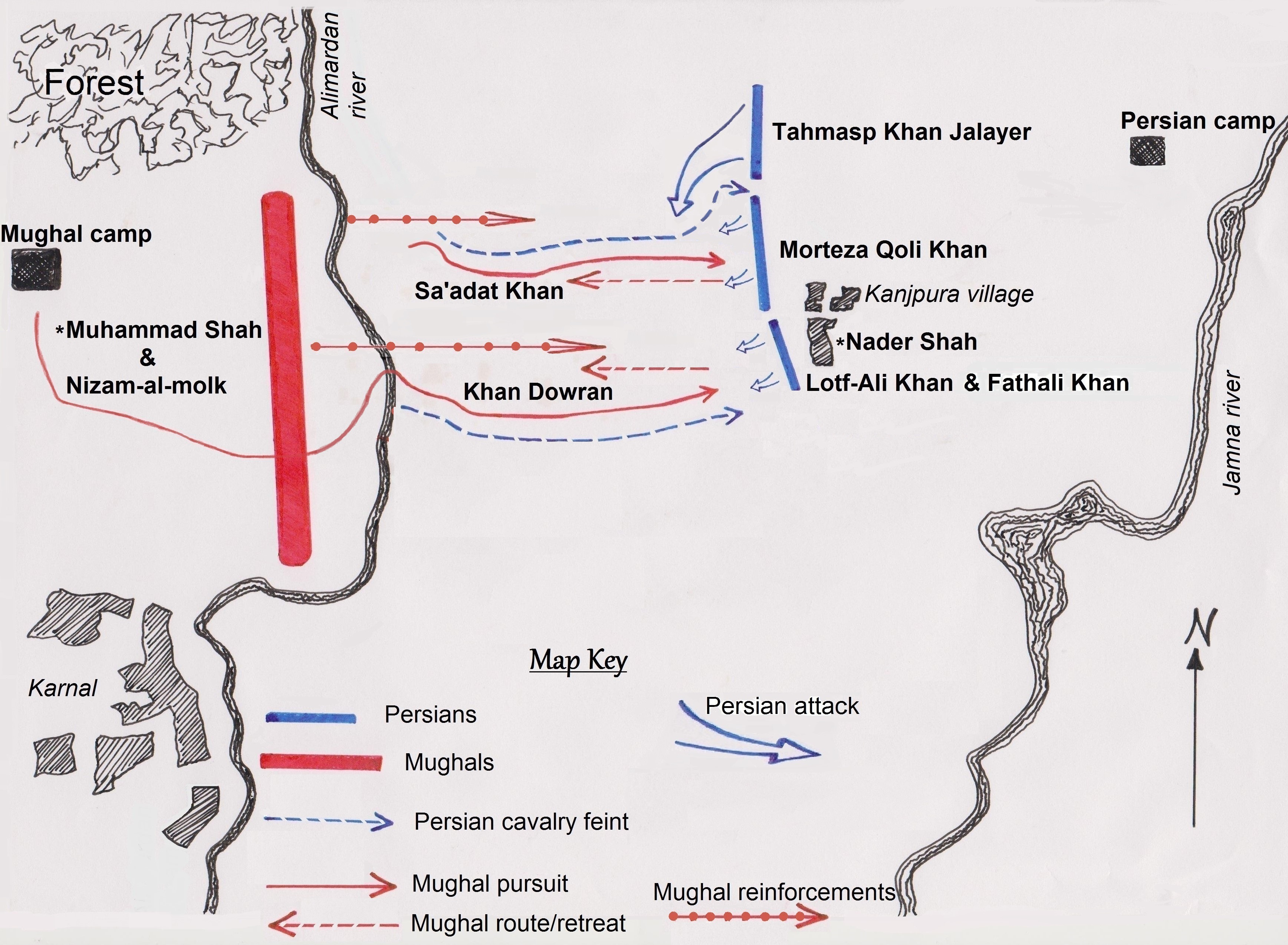
At the Battle of Karnal, Nader crushed an enormous Mughal army six times greater than his own

In 1738, Nader Shah conquered Kandahar, the last outpost of the Hotak dynasty and established Naderabad, Kandahar. His thoughts now turned to the Mughal Empire based in Delhi. This once powerful Muslim state to the east was falling apart as the nobles became increasingly disobedient and the Hindu Maratha Empire made inroads on its territory from the south-west. Its ruler Muhammad Shah was powerless to reverse this disintegration. Nader asked for the Afghan rebels to be handed over, but the Mughal emperor refused.

Nader used the pretext of his Afghan enemies taking refuge in India to cross the border and invade the militarily weak but still extremely wealthy Mughal empire. In a campaign against the governor of Peshawar, he took a small contingent of his forces on a daunting flank march through nearly impassable mountain passes, and took the enemy forces positioned at the mouth of the Khyber Pass completely by surprise, decisively beating them despite being outnumbered two-to-one. This led to the capture of Ghazni, Kabul, Peshawar, Sindh and Lahore.

As Nader moved into Mughal territories, he was accompanied by his loyal Georgian subject and future king of eastern Georgia, Erekle II, who led a Georgian contingent as a military commander as part of Nader's force. Following the defeat of Mughal forces priorly, he then advanced deeper into India, crossing the Indus River before the end of the year. The news of the Iranian army's swift and decisive successes against the northern vassal states of the Mughal empire caused much consternation in Delhi, prompting the Mughal ruler, Muhammad Shah, to summon an overwhelming force of some 300,000 men and march this massive host north towards the Iranian army.

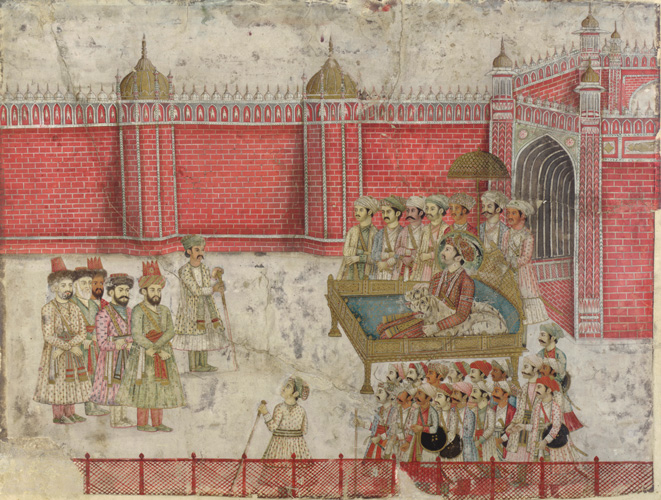
Afsharid forces negotiate with a Mughal Nawab.

Nader Shah crushed the Mughal army in less than three hours at the large Battle of Karnal on 13 February 1739. After this decisive victory, Nader captured Mohammad Shah and entered with him into Delhi. When a rumour broke out that Nader had been assassinated, some of the Indians attacked and killed Iranian troops. Nader, furious, reacted by ordering his soldiers to plunder and sack the city. During the course of one day (March 22) 20,000 to 30,000 Indians were killed by the Iranian troops, forcing Mohammad Shah to beg Nader for mercy.

In response, Nader Shah agreed to withdraw, but Mohammad Shah paid the consequence in handing over the keys of his royal treasury, and losing the Peacock Throne to Nader Shah. The Peacock Throne thereafter served as a symbol of Iranian imperial might. It is estimated that Nader took with him treasures worth as much as seven hundred million rupees. Among a trove of other fabulous jewels, Nader gained the Koh-i-Noor and Daria-i-Noor diamonds (Koh-i-Noor means "Mountain of Light" in Persian, Daria-i-Noor means "Sea of Light").

Nader Shah's troops left Delhi at the beginning of May 1739, but before they left, Nader ceded back to Muhammad Shah all territories to the east of the Indus that he had overrun. Nader Shah's soldiers also took with them thousands of elephants, horses and camels, loaded with the booty they had collected. On his return march, the Sikhs came out from the hills and ambushed Nader Shah's troops, taking some of the loot and captives with them. However, the remaining plunder seized from India was so valuable that Nader stopped taxation in Iran for a period of three years following his return. Nader attacked the empire to, perhaps, give his country some breathing space after previous turmoils. His successful campaign and replenishment of funds meant that he could continue his wars against Iran's archrival and neighbour, the Ottoman Empire.

==== North Caucasus, Central Asia, Arabia, and the second Ottoman war ====
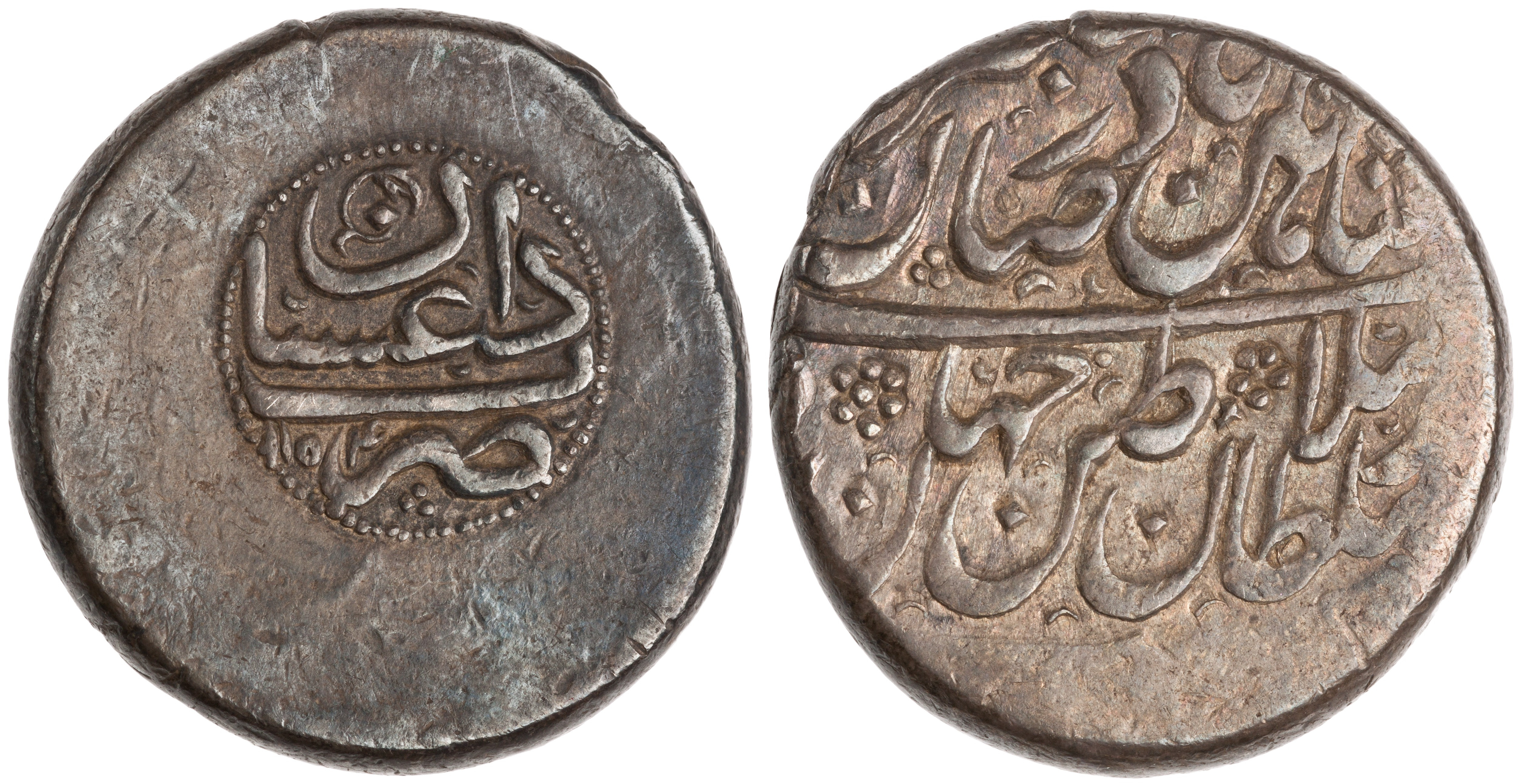
Silver coin of Nader Shah, minted in Dagestan, dated 1741/2 (left = obverse; right = reverse)

The Indian campaign was the zenith of Nader's career. After his return from India, Nader fell out with his eldest son Reza Qoli Mirza, who had ruled Iran during his father's absence. Reza had behaved highhandedly and somewhat cruelly but he had kept the peace. Having heard a rumour that Nader was dead, he had prepared to seize the throne by having the Safavid royal captives, Tahmasp and his nine-year-old son Abbas III, executed. On hearing the news, Reza's wife, who was Tahmasp's sister, committed suicide. Nader was not pleased with the young man's behaviour and humiliated him by removing him from the post of viceroy, but he took him on his expedition to conquer territory in Transoxiana. Nader became increasingly despotic as his health declined markedly. In 1740 he conquered Khanate of Khiva. After the Iranians had forced the Uzbek khanate of Bukhara to submit, Nader wanted Reza to marry the khan's elder daughter because she was a descendant of his role model Genghis Khan, but Reza flatly refused and Nader married the girl himself. Nader also conquered Khwarezm on this expedition into Central Asia.

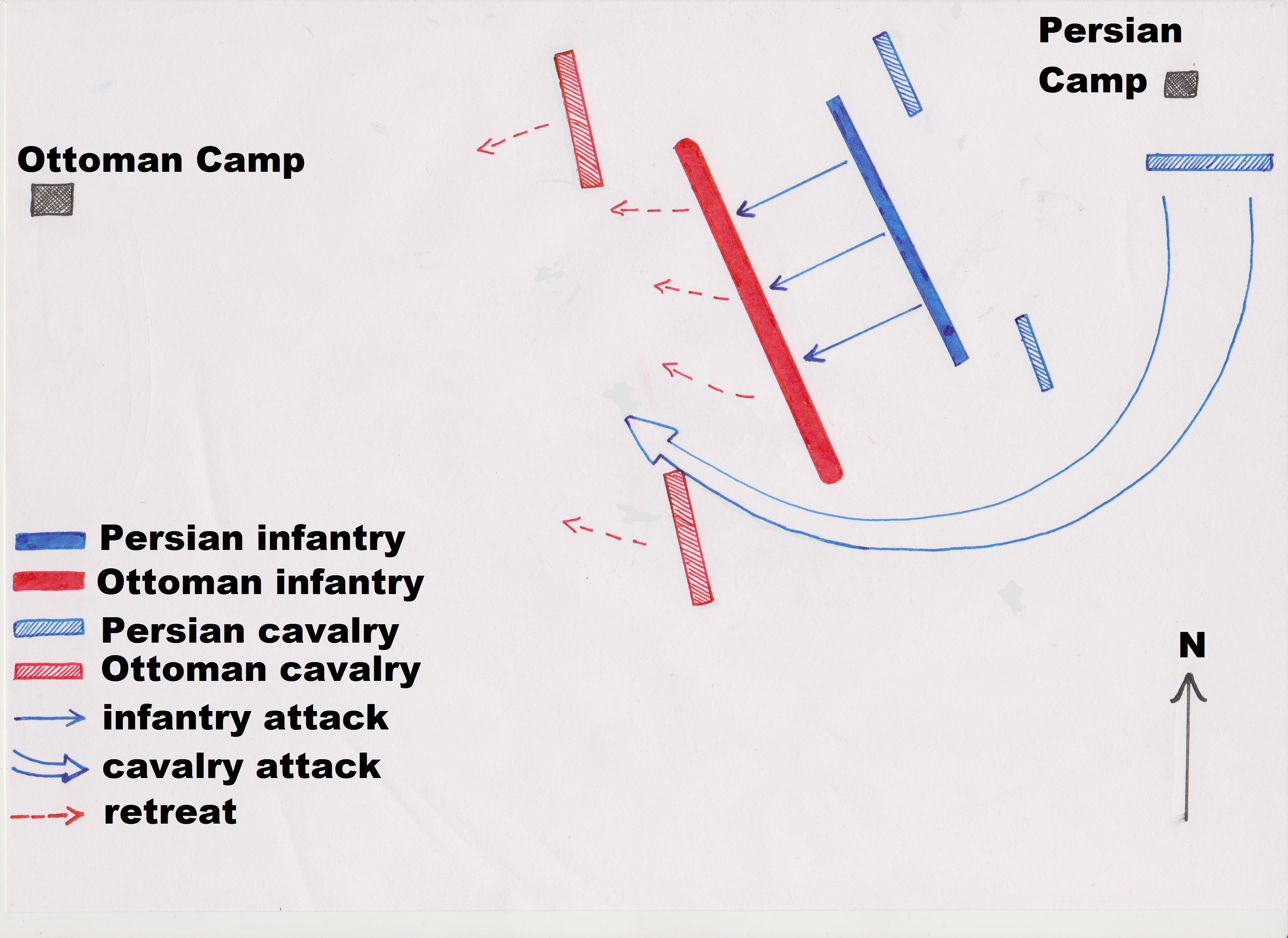
The Battle of Kars (1745) was the last major field battle Nader fought in his spectacular military career

Nader now decided to punish Daghestan for the death of his brother Ebrahim Qoli on a campaign a few years earlier. In 1741, while Nader was passing through the forest of Mazandaran on his way to fight the Daghestanis, an assassin took a shot at him but Nader was only lightly wounded. He began to suspect his son was behind the attempt and confined him to Tehran. Nader's increasing ill health made his temper ever worse. Perhaps it was his illness that made Nader lose the initiative in his war against the Lezgin tribes of Daghestan. Frustratingly for him, they resorted to guerrilla warfare and the Iranians could make little headway against them. Though Nader managed to take most of Dagestan during his campaign, the effective guerrilla warfare as deployed by the Lezgins, but also the Avars, Laks and Dargins made the Iranian re-conquest of this particular North Caucasian region this time a short lived one; several years later, Nader was forced to withdraw. During the same period, Nader accused his son of being behind the assassination attempt in Mazandaran. Reza angrily protested his innocence, but Nader had him blinded as punishment, although he immediately regretted it. Soon afterwards, Nader started executing the nobles who had witnessed his son's blinding. In his last years, Nader became increasingly paranoid, ordering the assassination of large numbers of suspected enemies.

With the wealth he gained, Nader started to build an Iranian navy. With lumber from Mazandaran and Gilan, he built ships in Bushehr and order to build new artillery in Amol. He also purchased thirty ships in India. He recaptured the island of Bahrain from the Arabs. In 1743, he conquered Oman and its main capital Muscat. In 1743, Nader started another war against the Ottoman Empire. Despite having a huge army at his disposal, in this campaign Nader showed little of his former military brilliance. It ended in 1746 with the signing of a peace treaty, in which the Ottomans agreed to let Nader occupy Najaf.

=== Military ===
The military forces of the Afsharid dynasty of Iran had their origins in the relatively obscure yet bloody inter-factional violence in Khorasan during the collapse of the Safavid state. The small band of warriors under local warlord Nader Qoli of the Turkomen Afshar tribe in north-east Iran were no more than a few hundred men. Yet at the height of Nader's power as the king of kings, Shahanshah, he commanded an army of 375,000 fighting men which constituted the single most powerful military force of its time, led by one of the most talented and successful military leaders of history.

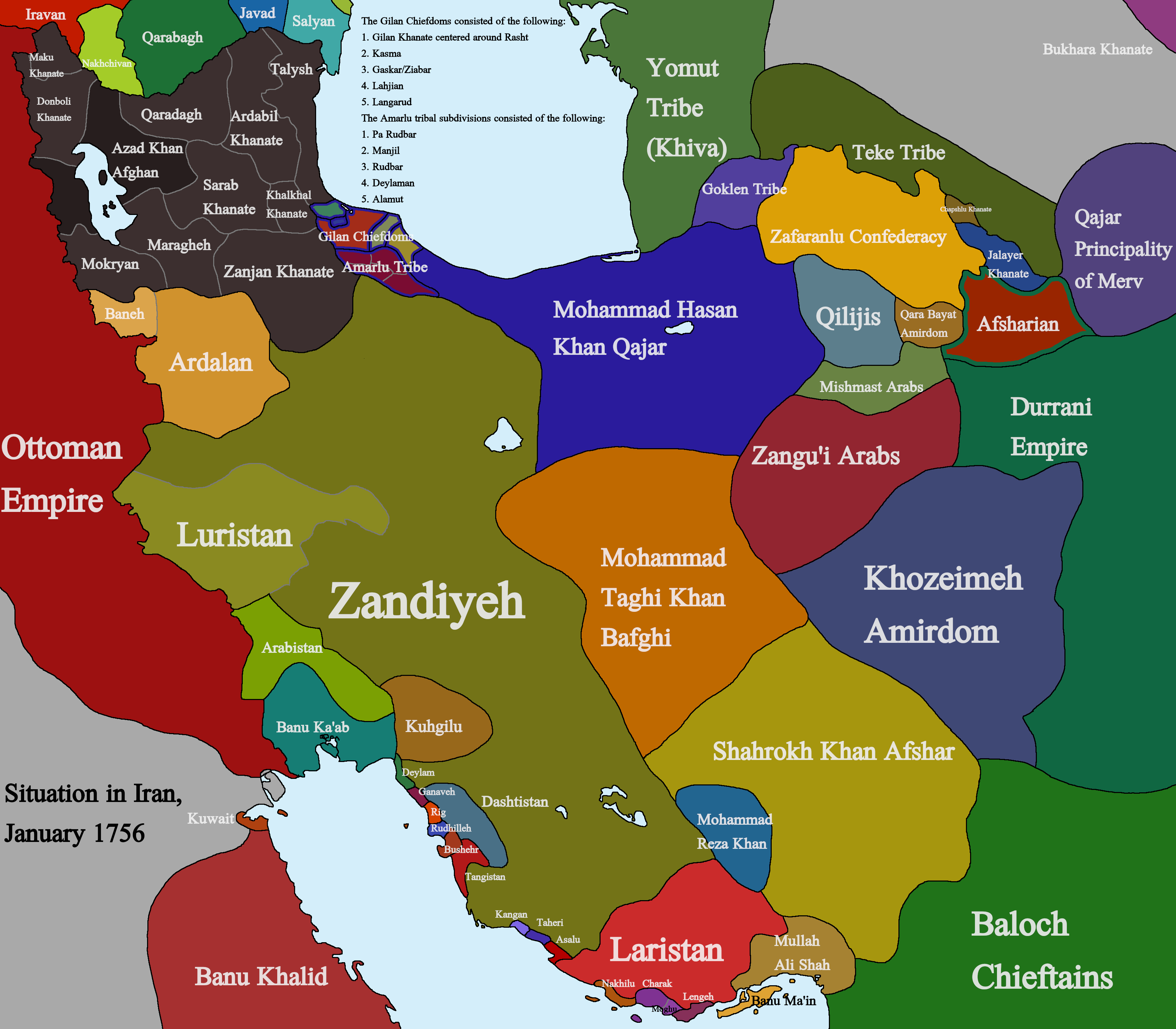
Map of Iran during the collapse of the Afsharid Empire

After Nader Shah's assassination at the hands of a faction of his officers in 1747, his powerful army fractured as the Afsharid state collapsed and the country plunged into decades of civil war. Although there were numerous Afsharid pretenders to the throne, (amongst many others), who attempted to regain control of the entire country, Iran remained a fractured political entity in turmoil until the campaigns of Agha Mohammad Khan Qajar toward the very end of the 18th century reunified the nation.

=== Civil war and downfall of the Afsharids ===
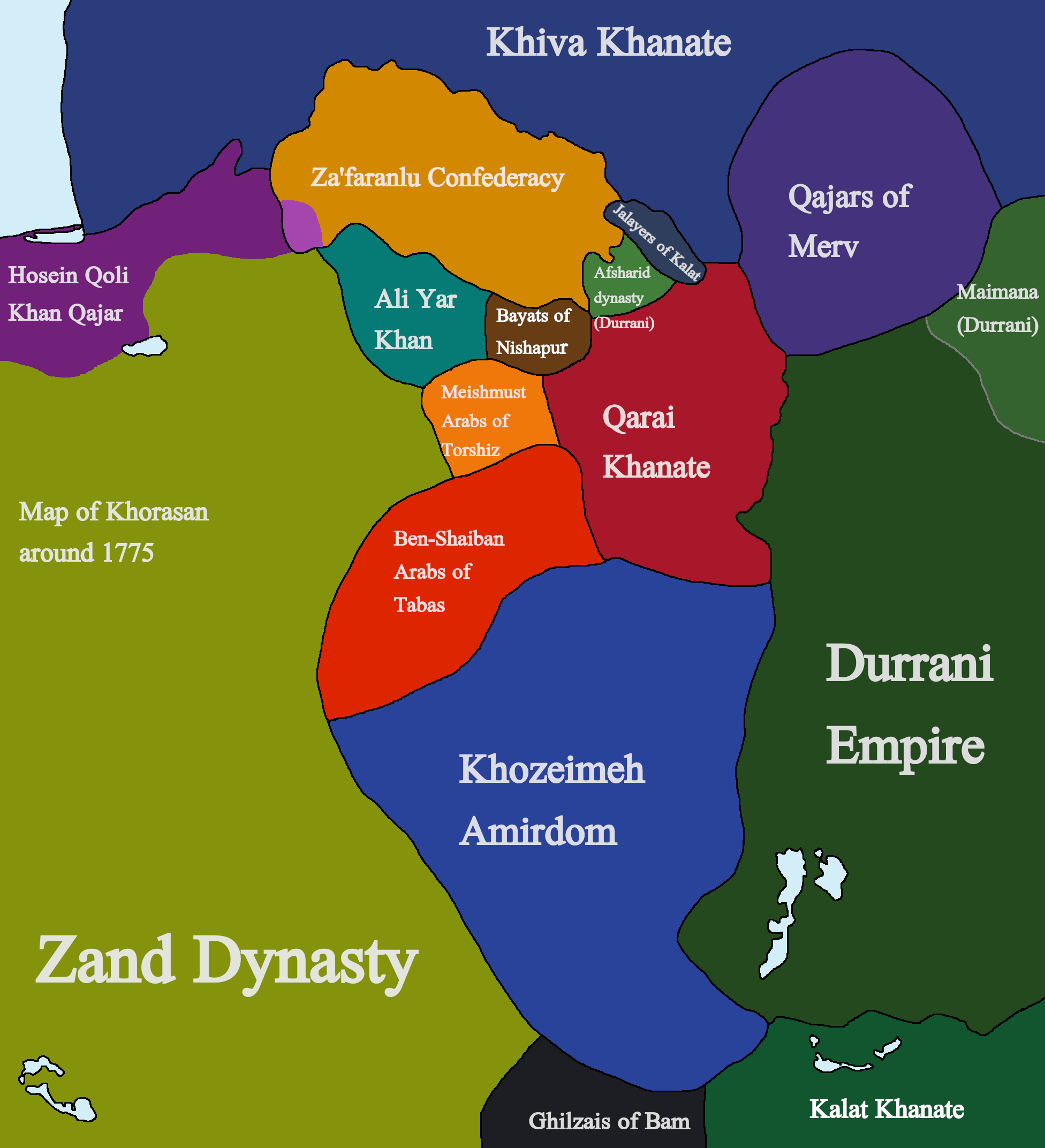
The Afsharid dynasty near its end, as its authority is reduced to Mashhad and the surrounding territory

After Nader Shah's death in 1747, his nephew Ali Qoli (who may have been involved in the assassination plot) seized the throne and proclaimed himself Adel Shah ("The Just King"). He ordered the execution of all of Nader's sons and grandsons, with the exception of the 13-year-old Shahrokh, the son of Reza Qoli. Meanwhile, Nader's former treasurer, Ahmad Shah Abdali, had declared his independence by founding the Durrani Empire. In the process, the eastern territories were lost and in the following decades became part of Afghanistan, the successor-state to the Durrani Empire.

The northern territories, Iran's most integral regions, had a different fate. Erekle II and Teimuraz II, who, in 1744, had been made the kings of Kakheti and Kartli respectively by Nader himself for their loyal service, capitalized on the eruption of instability and declared de facto independence. Erekle II assumed control over Kartli after Teimuraz II's death, thus unifying the two as the Kingdom of Kartli-Kakheti, becoming the first Georgian ruler in three centuries to preside over a politically unified eastern Georgia, and due to the frantic turn of events in mainland Iran he would be able to remain de facto autonomous through the Zand era. Under the successive Qajar dynasty, Iran managed to restore Iranian suzerainty over the Georgian regions, until they would be irrevocably lost in the course of the 19th century, to the Russian Empire.

Many of the rest of the territories in the Caucasus, comprising modern-day Azerbaijan, Armenia, and Dagestan, broke away into various khanates. Until the advent of the Zands and Qajars, its rulers had various forms of autonomy, but stayed vassals and subjects to the Iranian shah. During the early Qajar era, these territories in Transcaucasia and Dagestan would all be fully reincorporated into Iran, but eventually permanently lost as well (alongside Georgia), in the course of the 19th century to Imperial Russia through the two Russo-Persian Wars.

Adel made the mistake of sending his brother Ebrahim to secure the capital Isfahan. Ebrahim decided to set himself up as a rival, defeated Adel in battle, blinded him and took the throne. Adel had reigned for less than a year. Meanwhile, a group of army officers freed Shahrokh from prison in Mashhad and proclaimed him shah in October 1748. Ebrahim was defeated and died in captivity in 1750 and Adel was also put to death at the request of Nader Shah's widow. Shahrokh was briefly deposed in favour of another puppet ruler Soleyman II but, although blinded, Shahrokh was restored to the throne by his supporters.

He reigned in Mashhad and from the 1750s his territory was mostly confined to the city and its environs. He also faced the Durrani invasions into Khorasan, eventually becoming subjugated to them in Ahmad Shah's second campaign. In 1796, Agha Mohammad Khan Qajar, the founder of the Qajar dynasty, seized Mashhad and tortured Shahrokh to force him to reveal the whereabouts of Nader Shah's treasures. Shahrokh died of his injuries soon after and with him the Afsharid dynasty came to an end. One of Shahrokh's sons, Nader Mirza, revolted in 1797 upon Agha Mohammad Khan's death but the revolt was crushed and he was executed in April 1803. Shahrokh's descendants continue into the 21st century under the Afshar Naderi surname.

== Religious policy ==
The Safavids had introduced Shi'a Islam as the state religion of Iran. Nader was brought up as a Shi'a but later sympathised and desired unity with the Sunni faith as he gained power and began to push into the Ottoman Empire. He believed that Safavid Shi'ism had intensified the conflict with the Sunni Ottoman Empire. His army was a mix of Shi'a and Sunni (with a notable minority of Christians) and included his own Qizilbash as well as Uzbeks, Afghans, Christian Georgians and Armenians, and others.

Nader Shah wanted Iran to adopt a form of Shi'a Islam that would be more acceptable to Sunnis and suggested that Iran adopt a form of Shi'ism he called "Ja'fari", in honour of the sixth Shi'a Imam Ja'far al-Sadiq. He banned certain Shi'a practices which were particularly offensive to Sunnis, such as the cursing of the first three caliphs. Personally, Nader is said to have been indifferent toward religion and the French Jesuit who served as his personal physician reported that it was difficult to know which religion he followed and that many who knew him best said that he had none. Nader hoped that "Ja'farism" would be accepted as a fifth school (mazhab) of Sunni Islam and that the Ottomans would allow its adherents to go on the hajj, or pilgrimage, to Mecca, which was within their territory.

In the subsequent peace negotiations, the Ottomans refused to acknowledge Ja'farism as a fifth mazhab but they did allow Iranian pilgrims to go on the hajj. Nader was interested in gaining rights for Iranians to go on the hajj in part because of revenues from the pilgrimage trade. Nader's other primary aim in his religious reforms was to further weaken the Safavids as radical Shi'a Islam had always been a major element in support for the dynasty. He had the chief mullah of Iran strangled after he was heard expressing support for the Safavids. Among his reforms was the introduction of what came to be known as the kolah-e Naderi. This was a hat with four peaks which symbolised the first four caliphs.

== Flag ==
Nader Shah consciously avoided the using the colour green, as green was associated with Shia Islam and the Safavid dynasty.

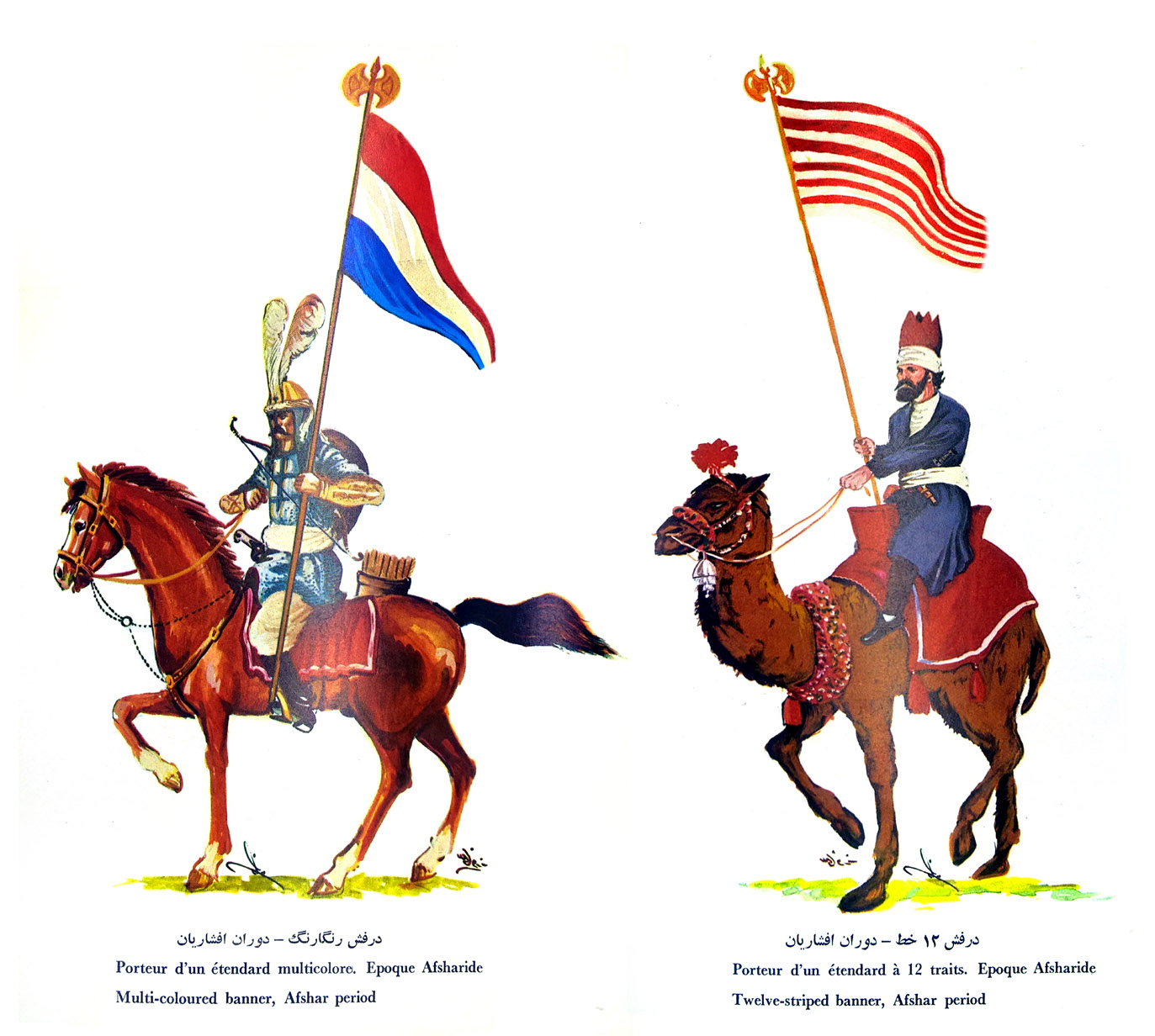
Imperial Standards of the Afsharid dynasty

The two imperial standards were placed on the right of the square already mentioned: one of them was in stripes of red, blue, and white, and the other of red, blue, white, and yellow, without any other ornament: though the old standards required 12 men to move them, the Shah lengthened their staffs, and made them yet heavier; he also put new colours of silk upon them, the one red and yellow striped, the other yellow edged with red: they were made of such an enormous size, to prevent their being carried off by the enemy, except by an entire defeat. The regimental colours were a narrow slip of silk, sloped to a point, some were red, some white, and some striped.

Navy Admiral flag being a white ground with a red Persian Sword in the middle. Although based on the writings of Jonas Hanway, we can see that the flags of the army regiments of Nader Shah were three-eared, but we cannot come to a conclusion about whether the royal flags of that time were three-eared or four-eared.

=== Gallery ===
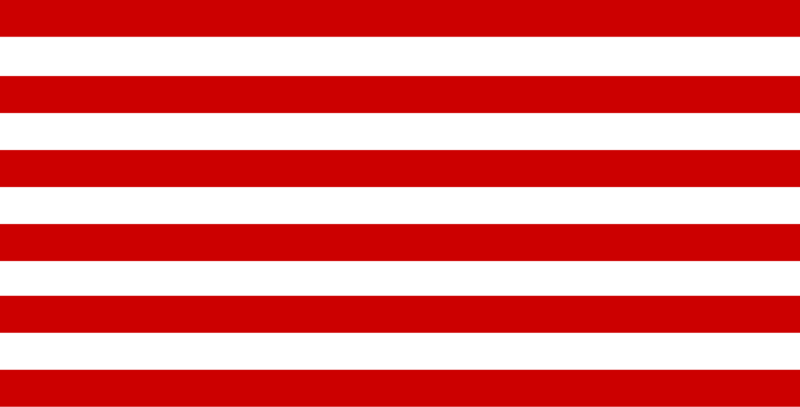
Nader Shah's flag

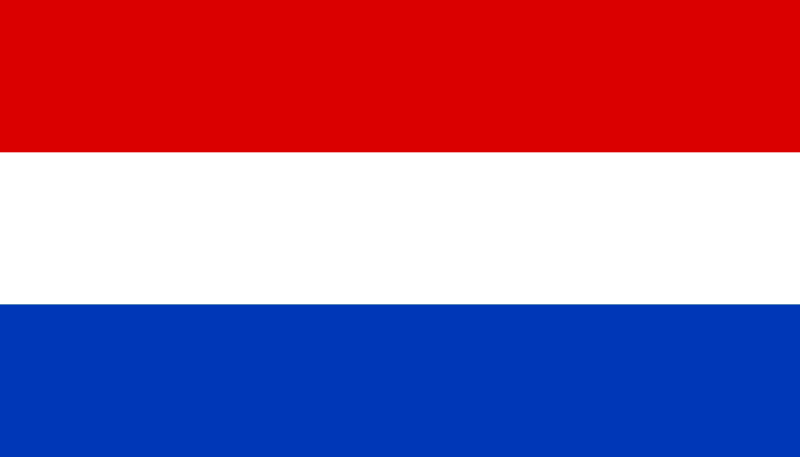
Imperial Standard of the Afsharid dynasty

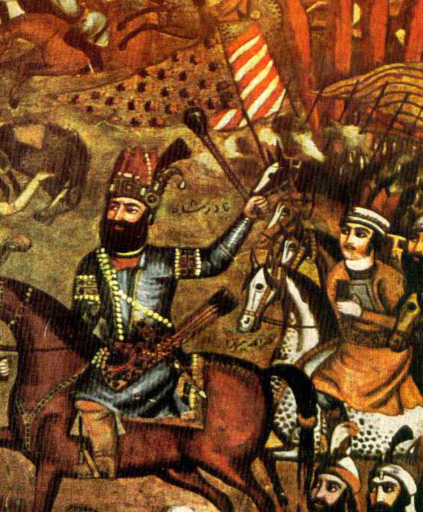
Nader in his Battles

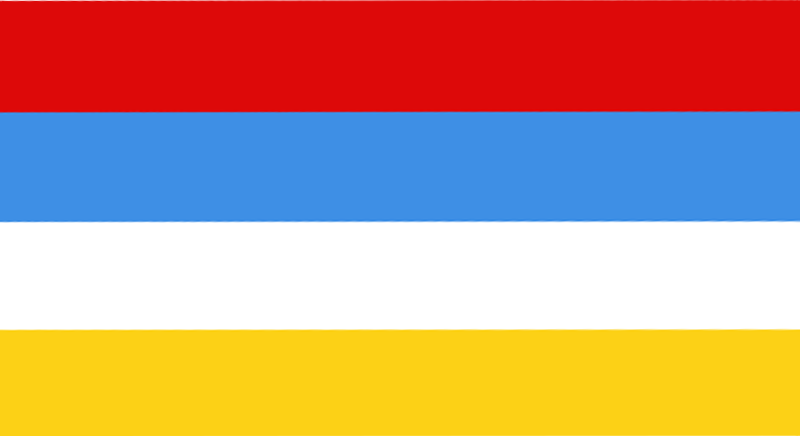
Another Imperial Standard of the Afsharid dynasty

Naval flag of Afsharid period

== Coins of each period of the Afsharid kings ==
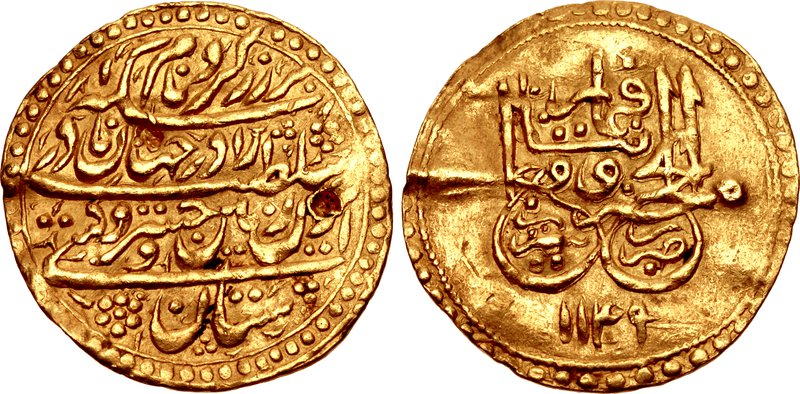
Coin of Nader Shah, minted in Shiraz (Note: Reverse: "Coined on gold the word of kingdom in the world, Nader of Greater Iran and the world-conqueror king Coin minted in Shiraz.")

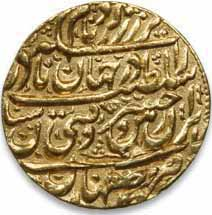
An Ashrafi Coin of Nader Shah (Note: Coin text: "Coined on gold the word of kingdom in the world, Nader of Greater Iran and the world-conqueror king Coin minted in Isfahan")

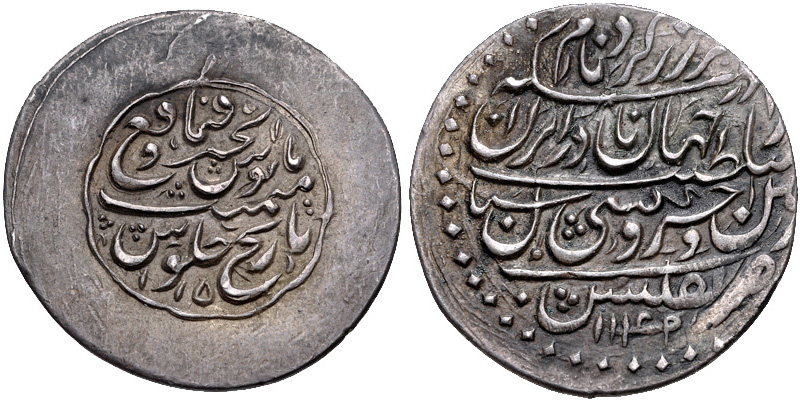
An Ashrafi Coin of Nader Shah (Note: Coin text: "Coined on gold the word of kingdom in the world, Nader of Greater Iran and the world-conqueror king Coin minted in Tbilisi)

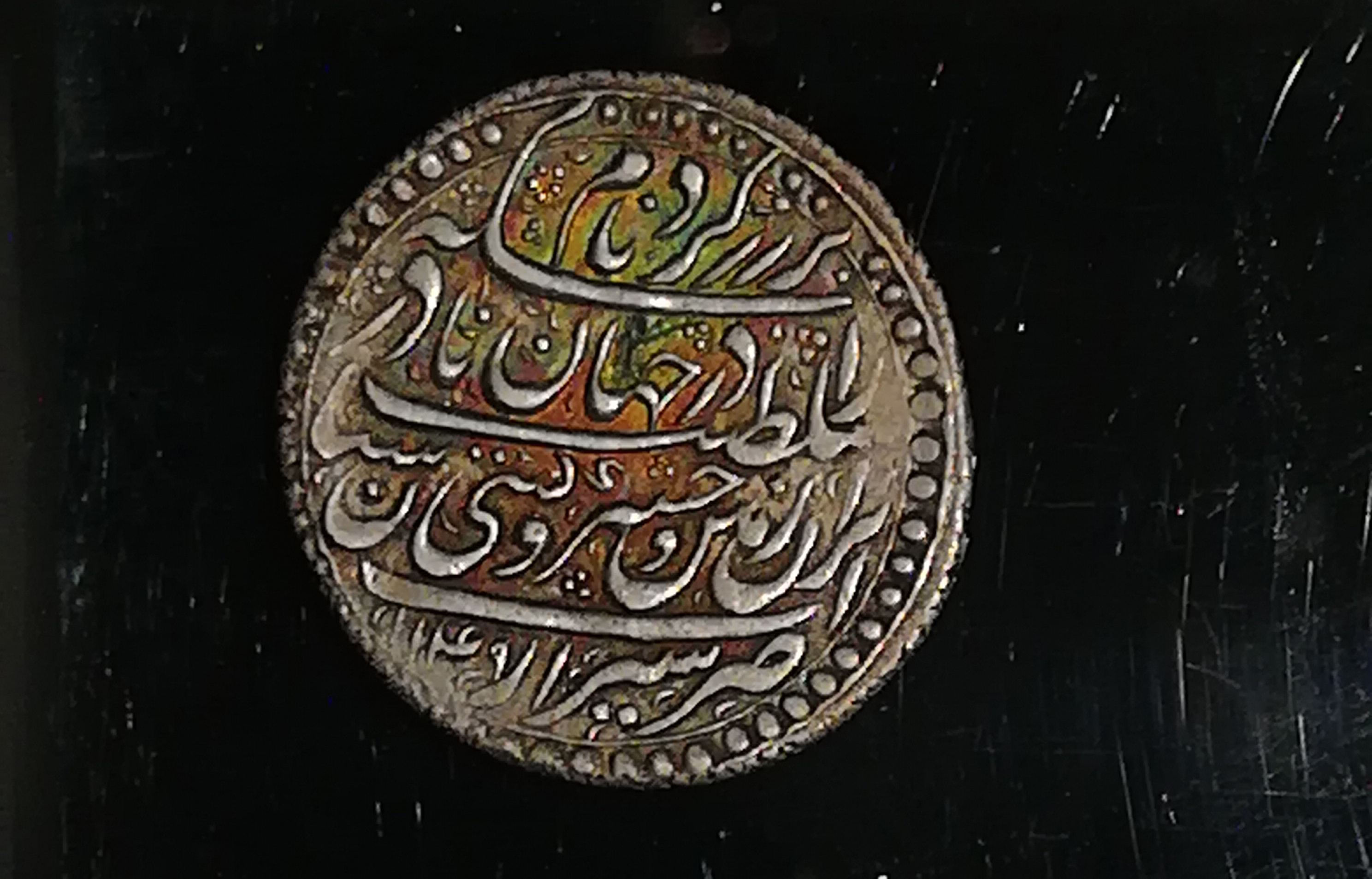
An Ashrafi Coin of Nader Shah (Note: Coin text: "Coined on gold the word of kingdom in the world, Nader of Greater Iran and the world-conqueror king Coin minted in Shiraz)

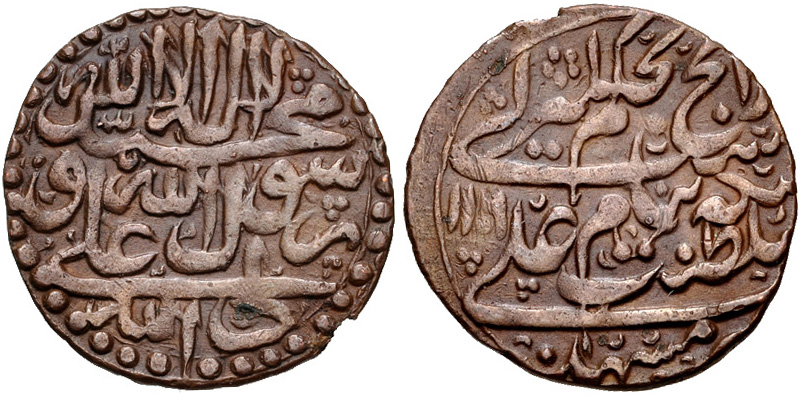
Coin minted during the reign of Adel Shah. Mashhad mint, dated 1747/48 (Note: Coin text: "The current circulation of the ruling of Lam Yazli/The coin of the monarchy named after Ali")

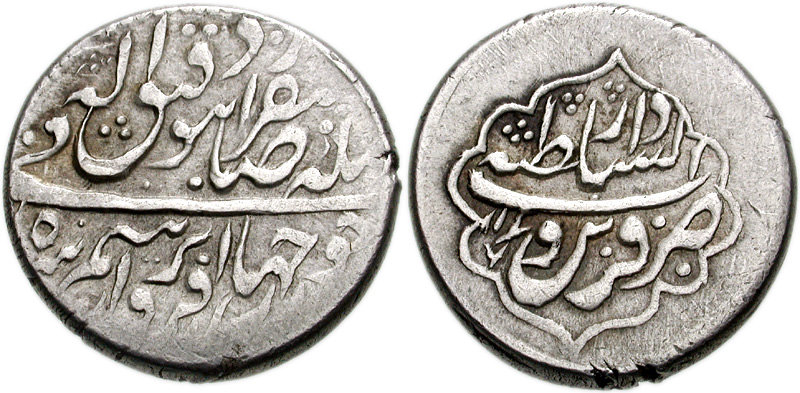
Coin of Ebrahim Shah, struck at the Qazvin mint (Note: Coin text: "The coin of Sahib Qarani struck for the success of Allah / Like the sun that illuminates the world, Ibrahim Shah")

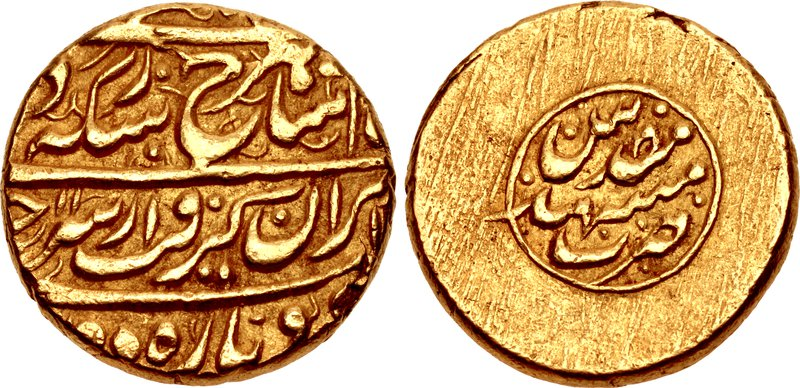
Coin minted in the name of Shahrokh Shah at Mashhad, between 1750–1755 (Note: Text on the Ashrafi coin of Shahrokh Shah (the last Afsharid Shah) reads: “Once again, the government of Iran has regained its youth.” The coin bears the inscription: “Coin of the true owner.”)

== Sources ==
- Axworthy, Michael (2018). Crisis, Collapse, Militarism and Civil War: The History and Historiography of 18th Century Iran. New York: Oxford University Press. p. 7. ISBN 978-0-19-025032-4.
- Amanat, Abbas (1997). Pivot of the Universe: Nasir Al-Din Shah Qajar and the Iranian Monarchy, 1831-1896. I.B.Tauris. ISBN 978-1-84511-828-0.
- Amanat, Abbas (2017). Iran: A Modern History. Yale University Press. pp. 1–992. ISBN 978-0-300-11254-2.
- Amanat, Abbas (2019). "Remembering the Persianate". In Amanat, Abbas; Ashraf, Assef (eds.). The Persianate World: Rethinking a Shared Sphere. Brill. pp. 15–62. ISBN 978-90-04-38728-7.
- Axworthy, Michael (2006). The Sword of Persia: Nader Shah, from Tribal Warrior to Conquering Tyrant. I.B.Tauris. ISBN 978-1-85043-706-2.
- Fisher, William Bayne; Avery, P.; Hambly, G. R. G; Melville, C. (1991). The Cambridge History of Iran. Vol. 7. Cambridge: Cambridge University Press. ISBN 0-521-20095-4.
- Rota, Giorgio (2020). "In a League of Its Own? Nāder Šāh and His Empire". In Rollinger, Robert; Degen, Julian; Gehler, Michael (eds.). Short-term Empires in World History. Springer. pp. 215–226.
- Tucker, Ernest (2012). "Afshārids". In Fleet, Kate; Krämer, Gudrun; Matringe, Denis; Nawas, John; Rowson, Everett (eds.). Encyclopaedia of Islam (3rd ed.). Brill Online. ISSN 1873-9830.
