= Treaty with Morocco (1836) =

1836 treaty between Morocco and the United States

- Type: Treaty of Peace
- Signed: September 16, 1836
- Location: Meknes, Morocco
- Ratified: January 28, 1837
- Parties: Morocco; United States
- Languages: Arabic and English

The Treaty with Morocco was signed on September 16, 1836 (3 Jumada II, A.H. 1252), between the United States of America and Morocco under the 'Alawid dynasty. Submitted to the Senate December 26, 1836. (Message of December 20, 1836.) Resolution of advice and consent January 17, 1837. Ratified by the United States January 28, 1837.

== Treaty ==
The treaty was a permanent treaty in the history of the United States and is considered the oldest treaty of its kind in its history with foreign countries. This treaty resulted the United States not recognising the French protectorate in Morocco. Despite the repeated request of France, it did not recognise the protectorate until it entered World War I on October 20, 1917.

The agreement included 25 articles dealing with various topics:

- Residence of citizens of the two countries.
- Freedom of trade.
- System of ships in ports and on the high seas.
- Adjusting transactions during the war between the two parties.
- Observe neutrality in an event of war between the two parties and another foreign country.

== See also ==
- List of treaties
- Treaty with Tripoli (1805)
- Treaty with Algiers (1815)
- Treaty with Tunis (1824)
