= Mediterranean pass =

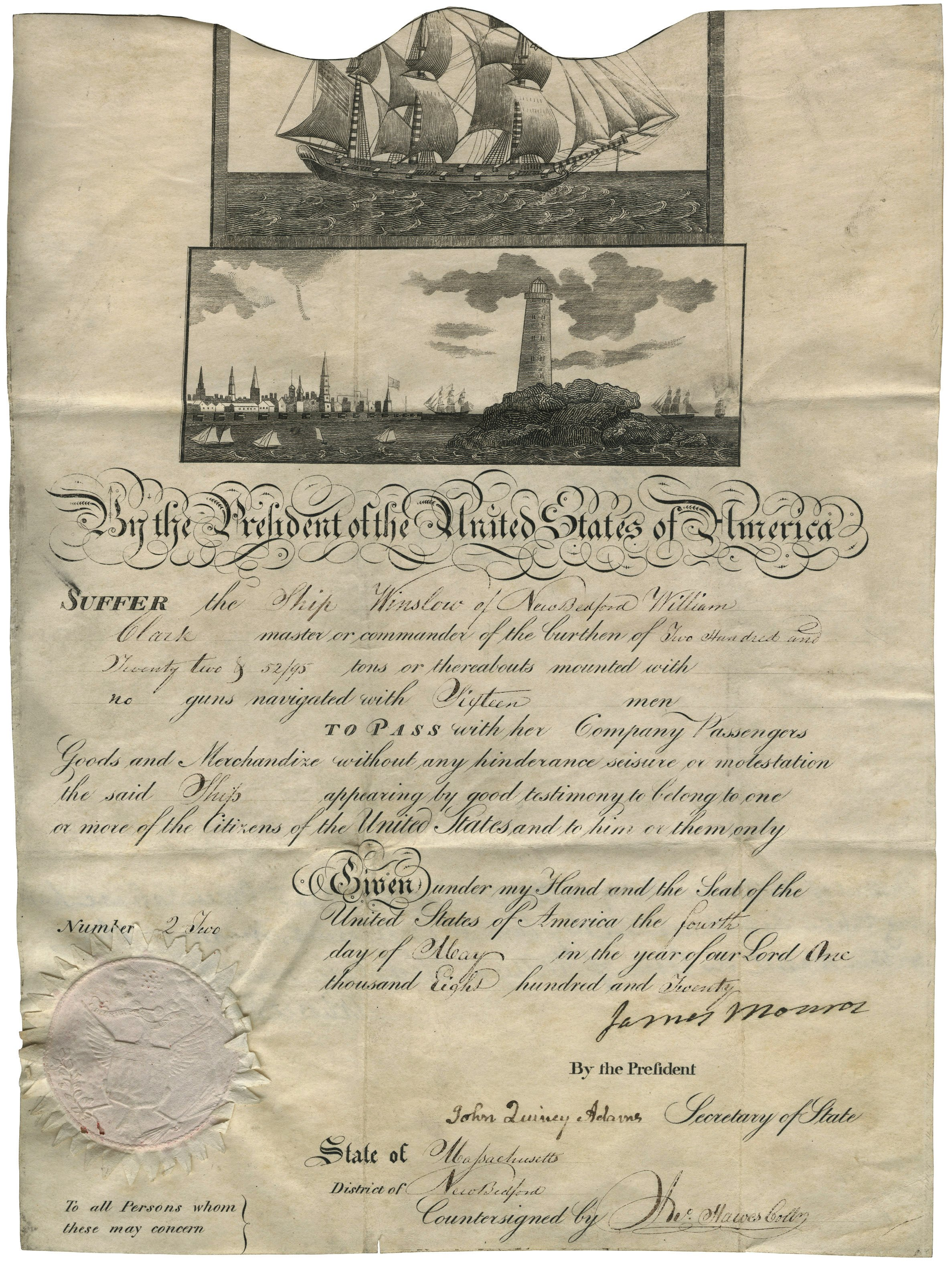
A U.S. Mediterranean passport from 1820

The Mediterranean pass (or Mediterranean passport, the name used in the United States) was a document which identified a ship as being protected under a treaty with states of the Barbary Coast. Such a treaty exacted tribute in exchange for protection from Barbary pirates capturing that country's ships and crews. These passes identified ships which had safe passage.

The top of the British document was cut off in an erratic scalloped pattern used to confirm its authenticity. The matching top of the document was sent to officials along the Barbary Coast, so cruisers from those ports would have samples for comparison with the edge of the documents. A similar design was adopted by the United States, although U.S. Consul General in Algiers Richard O'Brien pointed out the document should be on thicker paper (or parchment) and kept in a tin container so as to ensure a better match between tops and bottoms (he also suggested that ships fly the American flag rather than the flags of individual states).

Countries known to have issued such documents include:

- Algeria: Turkish passes were temporarily issued to some vessels by the Dey of Algiers.
- Britain
- Spain
- United States of America

The United States issued Mediterranean passports starting with a September 5, 1795, treaty with the Dey of Algiers, and continuing through the mid-19th century.

== Background ==
For about 300 years, the Mediterranean Sea lanes were largely controlled by the north African Muslim states of the Barbary Coast (Tripoli, Algiers, Morocco, and Tunis) through piracy. Hostages were either ransomed or sold into slavery. Over time, most countries found it expedient to simply pay a yearly tribute (bribe) to the Barbary sultans in exchange for safe passage through the Mediterranean.

Following the American Revolution, the United States was no longer under the protection of the British tribute treaties, resulting in the crippling of American commerce in the Mediterranean. Having no significant navy, the U.S. decided to form tribute treaties with the Barbary states, such as the 1796 Treaty of Tripoli. This treaty required ship's passports within 18 months.

== See also ==
- Barbary treaties
- First Barbary War
- Second Barbary War
