= Tobias Lear =

Personal secretary of George Washington (1762-1816)

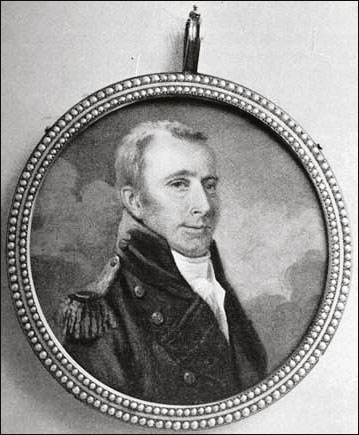

Private Secretary to the President
- In office April 30, 1789 – March 4, 1797
- President: George Washington
- Preceded by: Office established
- Succeeded by: William Smith Shaw

Personal details
- Born: September 19, 1762 Portsmouth, Province of New Hampshire, British America
- Died: October 11, 1816 (aged 54) Georgetown, Washington, D.C., United States
- Resting place: Congressional Cemetery
- Spouses: Mary Long (m. 1790; died 1793) Frances Bassett Washington (m. 1795; died 1796) Frances Dandridge Henley (m. 1803)
- Education: Dummer Charity School; Harvard College
- Occupation: Diplomat; Secretary
- Known for: Personal secretary to George Washington

Tobias Lear (September 19, 1762 – October 11, 1816) was the personal secretary to President George Washington. Lear served Washington from 1784 until the former-President's death in 1799. Lear's journal details Washington's final moments and his last words: 'Tis well.

Tobias Lear also served third president Thomas Jefferson, as commercial agent to Saint-Domingue (modern-day Haiti), and as peace envoy in the Mediterranean Sea and North Africa during the First Barbary War (1801–1805) and the Second Barbary War (1815). He was responsible for negotiating a peace treaty with the Bey of Tripoli that ended the first Barbary War.

== Early life ==
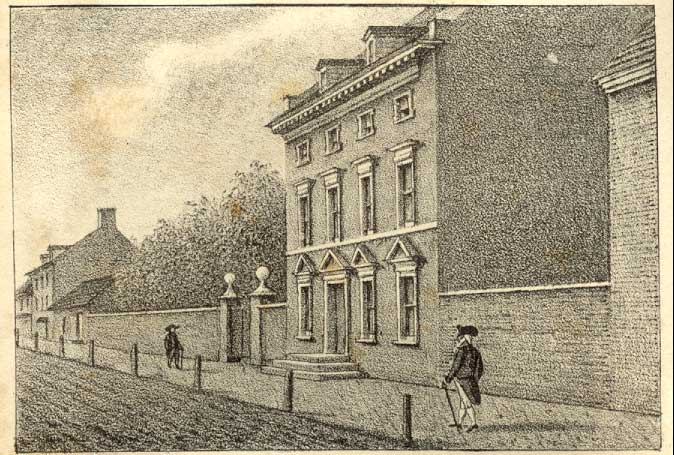
President's House, Philadelphia, Pennsylvania. Lear lived and worked in Washington's presidential mansion, 1790–93. His son was born there, and his first wife died there.

Lear was born on Hunking Street in the seaport town of Portsmouth, New Hampshire, on September 19, 1762, a fifth-generation American and the fifth generation of his family named Tobias. His parents were Tobias Lear (born August 1, 1737) (cousin of John Langdon) and Mary Stillson Lear (born May 25, 1739). His parents were married on December 29, 1757. The family home on Hunking Street, which still stands today, had been built in 1742 by the Stillson family. Lear had an older sister named Mary (Polly).

Before going to college, Lear attended Dummer Charity School (now known as The Governor's Academy) where Samuel Moody helped prepare Lear for college. Instead of joining the Continental Army, as many of his contemporaries did, Lear attended Harvard College, beginning in 1779, during the American Revolutionary War. He graduated with thirty classmates in 1783.

== Career ==
He began his career by being an apprentice until a family friend, Benjamin Lincoln, recommended him for the job of tutoring Martha Washington's grandchildren and to the post of George Washington's personal secretary, both to which he was hired in 1786. He was integrated into Washington's house and his post quickly evolved beyond clerk to being Washington's right-hand man, doing whatever Washington needed, such as tutoring, filling out expense reports, and writing letters. He performed all his duties well.

Lear moved with Washington to New York City in 1789, when Washington became president, and they often dined alone together during his presidency. Lear was responsible for filling out Washington's expense reports as president, which Washington had wisely chosen instead of a $25,000 salary, as they turned out to be much more.

In 1793, at the start of Washington's second term, Lear decided to leave Washington and start out on his own (albeit with help from Washington). He started a company, T. Lear & Company, which focused on two things: working with Washington's Potomac Company to promote river traffic to the soon-to-be nation's capitol and participating in land speculation there. Lear traveled to Europe to sell parcels of land in Washington, DC, but was unsuccessful. His engineering work related to the Potomac Company also failed to enable navigation around two waterfalls on the Potomac River. He lost money in this failed venture despite his wealthy partners.

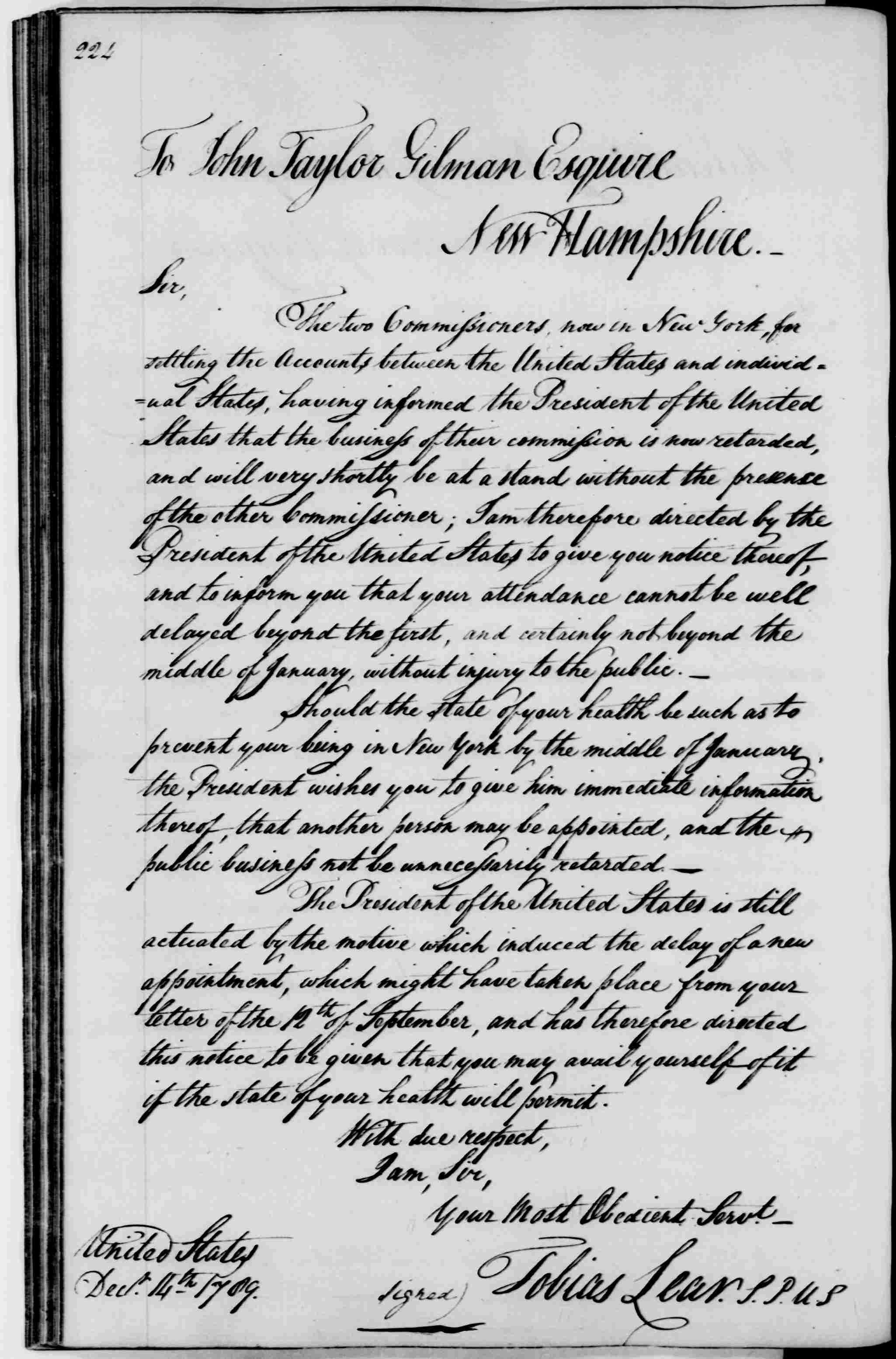
Letter from Lear to John Taylor Gilman of Exeter, New Hampshire, 1789

== Family life ==
Lear married Mary (Polly) Long, his childhood sweetheart, in 1790. Together they had a son, Benjamin Lincoln Lear (b. 1791), but Polly died in the President's House in Philadelphia during the 1793 yellow fever epidemic that claimed around 5,000 people. George Washington attended Polly's funeral, the only funeral he attended in his eight years as President, a testimony to the relationship between the two men. In 1795, Lear married Frances Bassett Washington, the recent widow of the President's nephew, George Augustine Washington, but Fanny died in 1796 of tuberculosis. Tobias married again, this time to the young Frances Dandridge Henley. His new wife was also nicknamed Fanny and was the niece of Martha Washington.

== Controversy ==
In the late 1790s, Lear's finances became more distraught. During this period, he continued to run unpaid errands for Washington. On one of these errands, Lear collected rent from one of Washington's tenants, but pocketed the funds. Washington found out when he questioned his tenant as to why they had not paid. Washington was furious for at least two days but Lear apologized and was quickly forgiven.

The next year, Lear was given the rank of colonel as chief aide to Washington, who had been reappointed by Congress to command the troops during a period when a French attack was feared. He preferred to be addressed as Colonel Lear for the rest of his life despite the fact that the French never attacked by land and he never faced active duty.

Lear collected funds for the sale of a business partner's real estate and kept the funds. He feigned illness for several months before meeting the man and apologizing, confessing and agreeing to reimburse him.

== Washington's death ==
In 1799, Washington unexpectedly died while Lear was visiting him at Mount Vernon, leading to Lear's famous diary entry:

About ten o'clk, Saturday December 14, 1799, Washington made several attempts to speak to me before he could effect it, at length he said,—"I am just going. Have me decently buried; and do not let my body be put into the Vault in less than two days after I am dead." I bowed assent. He then looked at me again and said, "Do you understand me?" I replied "Yes." "'Tis well" said he.

Lear oversaw the funeral arrangements, even to the detail of measuring the corpse at 6 feet 3.5 inches long and 1 foot 9 inches from shoulder to shoulder. Lear inherited a lifetime interest in Walnut Tree Farm.

== Missing Washington papers ==
Lear's only biographer, Ray Brighton, was convinced that Lear destroyed many of Washington's letters and diary entries, which he had possession of for about a year after Washington's death. Lear was to work on a Washington biography with Bushrod Washington, a Washington nephew, who had contacted Lear about collecting Washington's papers and collaborating on a Washington biography. Swaths of Washington's diary (especially sections during the presidency and the American Revolutionary War) and a few key letters were discovered missing about a year after their transfer to Supreme Court Chief Justice John Marshall, who had instead volunteered to write the biography. Lear denied destroying any papers in a long letter to Marshall; however, Lear's own correspondence casts this into doubt. Lear wrote Alexander Hamilton offering to suppress Washington documents: "There are as you well know among the several letters and papers many which every public and private consideration should withhold from further inspection." Lear explicitly asked Hamilton in that letter if he desired any military papers removed. Suspiciously, almost all the presidential diary entries are gone except for those that covered Washington's 1789 visit to Lear's family home in Portsmouth. Six key Washington letters are also missing.

== Jefferson as ally ==
Many biographers believe that Thomas Jefferson and Washington had a big falling out over a letter Jefferson sent to Filippo Mazzei in Italy, which called Washington's administration Anglican, monarchical and aristocratic, and claimed that Washington had appointed as military officers "all timid men that prefer the calm of despotism to the boisterous sea of liberty." The letter was eventually published overseas and then re-translated back into English by Noah Webster and published in America. Its publication is thought to have sparked a nasty correspondence of three rounds of letters between Jefferson and Washington. In conversation with friends over wine, Lear admitted the existence of the letters but subsequently denied having said such. Albin Rollins, a Mount Vernon overseer, stated to a nephew of Washington that he had seen the letters and that the second round was so strong that it made the hair on his head rise and that a duel must surely follow. The missing letters' loss brought great benefit to Thomas Jefferson, as they would have been fuel for Jefferson's political enemies. Brighton believes (without direct evidence) that Jefferson requested Lear to destroy the letters and that Jefferson rewarded Lear for their destruction for the rest of his life.

== Appointments ==
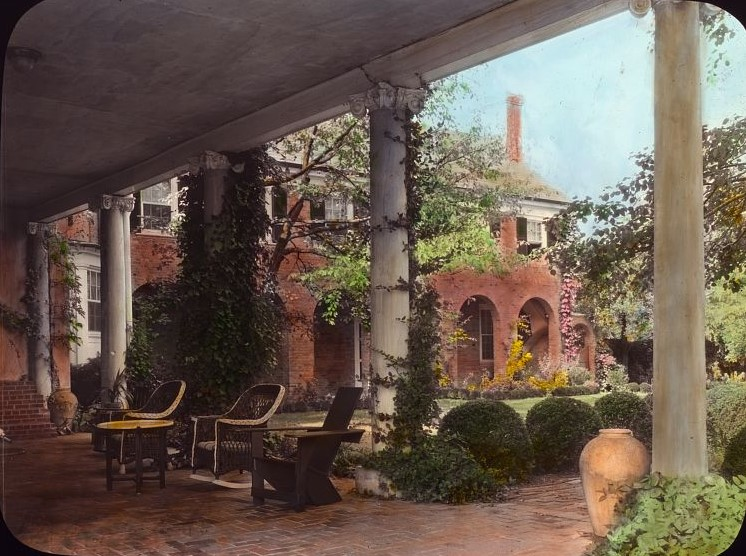
"Wellington," Malcolm Matheson house, Fox Hunt Road, Alexandria, Virginia, by Frances Benjamin Johnston, 1931. Built in the 18th century for Colonel Tobias Lear; from his death in 1818, owned by descendants of George Washington

Jefferson appointed the financially struggling Lear to the potentially lucrative assignment of American commercial agent in Saint-Domingue at the start of his term of president. During this job, Lear appointed Rollins to oversee Walnut Tree Farm. Unfortunately, Lear arrived right before Napoleon Bonaparte was about to clamp down on the slave rebellion there. In a January 17, 1802, long letter of gratitude to Jefferson, Lear predicted the long anticipated French response was still six months out. One week later, a French armada arrived at Cap-Français and captured the main port there from Toussaint L'Ouverture. Lear attempted to help the Americans during the ensuing French embargo. However, with the Louisiana Purchase looming large for Jefferson, Lear was asked not to irritate the French commanders, and after a suggestion from James Madison, who was then Secretary of State, retreated back to Virginia.

A year after returning to the U.S., in 1803, Jefferson appointed Lear, now 41, to be Consul General to the North African coast with the privilege of simultaneously conducting private business. Before preparing to depart on the USS Philadelphia to Algeria, Lear was married for the third time (to Frances Dandridge Henley). In a last-minute change, the Lears were reassigned to the USS Constitution, and the Philadelphia ended up being captured in the Mediterranean. Lear became the primary negotiator for the crew's release in 1805 with the Treaty of Tripoli that ended the First Barbary War in which he was alleged to have mishandled the resolution. The Lears stayed on in Algiers until 1812 when Lear fell out of favor with the Dey.

Upon their return, the U.S. was in the throes of the War of 1812. Consequently, they had to follow a circuitous route back to Portsmouth from their entry in Virginia. Under James Madison, he was then appointed as a secretary to the War Department and moved to a location a few blocks from the White House. While serving in this post, the British attacked and burned the city.

In 1814, Lear was elected a member of the American Antiquarian Society.

== Death ==
On October 11, 1816, Lear apparently committed suicide by shooting himself with a pistol. Although it was known that he suffered severe headaches and stints of depression, as well as being vilified by the press, the specific reasons for his suicide are unknown. It is curious that this "scrupulous record keeper" left behind neither suicide note nor will. He is buried in the Congressional Cemetery, Washington, D.C.

== See also ==
- Samuel Osgood House — First Presidential Mansion.
- Alexander Macomb House — Second Presidential Mansion.
- President's House (Philadelphia) — Third Presidential Mansion.
- Bibliography of George Washington

== Sources ==
- Brighton, Ray (1985), Randall, Peter E. (ed.), The Checkered Career of Tobias Lear, Portsmouth Marine Society, pp. 16, 20, 24, ISBN 0-915819-03-1
- Zacks, Richard (2005), The Pirate Coast: Thomas Jefferson, the First Marines, and the Secret Mission of 1805, New York: Hyperion, ISBN 978-1-4013-0003-6

Further reading

- George, Washington (1906). Jared Sparks (ed.). Letters and Recollections of George Washington:
  Being Letters to Tobias Lear and Others Between 1790 and 1799, Showing the First American in the Management of His Estate and Domestic Affairs. Archibald Constable and Company Limited. (eBook download options)
