= Treaty of Constantinople (1736) =

1736 treaty between the Ottomans and Persia

Treaty of Constantinople was a treaty between Ottoman Empire and Afsharid Iran signed on 24 September 1736, ending the Ottoman–Persian War (1730–1735).

== Background ==
Treaty of Ahmet Pasha (1732) between the two countries had been found unsatisfactory in both countries. Ottoman Sultan Mahmud I didn't approve the abandonment of Tabriz and Nader, the future Shah of Iran dethroned Tahmasp II for accepting Ottoman control of the Caucasus.

== War ==
Shortly after the treaty of Ahmet Pasha, Nader declared war and attacked Ottoman Iraq and Caucasus. In Iraq, after some initial victories such as capturing Kirkuk, he was repelled. But in Caucasus he was more successful. In less than two years, the Ottomans had to abandon both Tbilisi and Yerevan. Meanwhile, the Russian Empire was about to attack the Ottoman Empire in Crimea and Ukraine (see Russo-Turkish War (1735–1739)). Therefore, the porte was compelled to sign a peace treaty.

== Terms of the treaty ==
Initial discussions between Ali Pasha (Ottoman side) and Mirza Muhammed (Persian side) in Iran about the territorial changes presented no big problem. But the competition between the two sects of Islam resulted heated discussions in the following sessions in Constantinople. Finally the terms were;

1. Ottoman Empire recognized Nader as the new shah of Persia.
2. Ottoman Empire conceded Caucasus to Persia
3. The Ottomans also agreed to allow the Iranian hajis (pilgrims) to Mecca (then under Ottoman control)

== Aftermath ==
By the treaty of Ahmed Pasha, Persia had regained Western Iran and by the treaty of Constantinople Persia had further regained the Caucasus. But Nader had other plans. He was also planning to annex Iraq and possibly Eastern Anatolia. That's why he renewed war in 1743. But this time, he was not successful. (see Treaty of Kerden)
