= Kolah-e Naderi =

Afsharid semi crown headgear

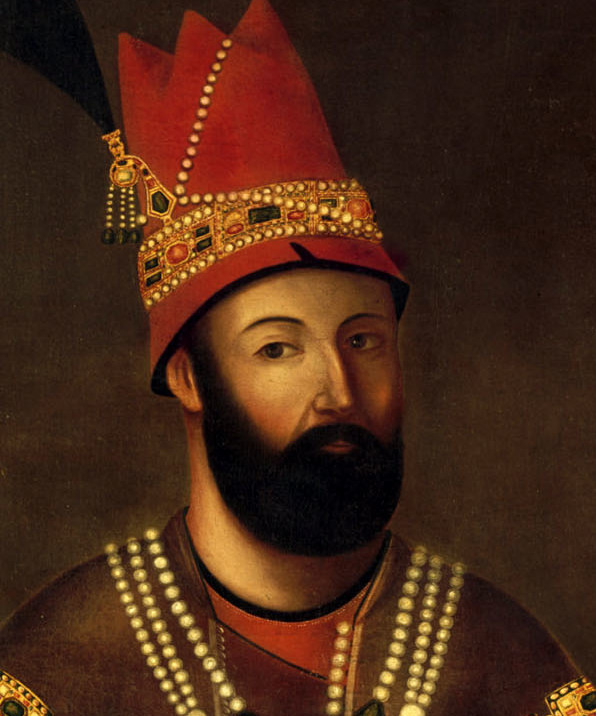
Nader Shah depicted in Kolah-e Naderi

Kolah-e Naderi (Persian: کلاه نادری, lit. 'Naderi hat') is an Iranian hat introduced during the reign of Nader Shah (r. 1736–1747). It was a tall, usually red, four-pointed cap that became associated with the Afsharid dynasty.

Nader shah tried to redefine religious and political legitimacy in Persia at symbolic and substantive levels. Nader shah firstly replaced the Taj-e Haydari, which was pieced with the Twelve Imams of Shia Islam, and introduced a hat to be known as the Kolah-e Naderi. This was a red hat with four peaks which symbolised the first four caliphs of Islam. Alternatively, it has also been recorded that the four peaks symbolised the territories of Persia, India, Turkestan, and Khwarazm.

== Sources ==
- Tucker, Ernest (2006). "Nāder Shah". In Yarshater, Ehsan (ed.). Encyclopædia Iranica (Online ed.). Encyclopædia Iranica Foundation.
- Curatola, Giovanni (2018). Iran Arte Islamica (in Italian). Milan: Jaca Book. ISBN 978-88-16-60569-5.
- Axworthy, Michael (2009). The Sword of Persia: Nader Shah, from Tribal Warrior to Conquering Tyrant. London: I.B. Tauris. ISBN 9780755610549.
