= Treaty with Tunis (1797) =

1797 treaty between the United States and Tunis

The Treaty with Tunis was signed on August 28, 1797, between the United States of America and the Barbary State of Tunis. As the treaty provided in Article One:

There shall be a perpetual and constant peace between the United States of America and the magnificent Pasha, Bey of Tunis, and also a permanent friendship, which shall more and more increase.

The treaty is notable because of its religious language in the opening statement, namely recognizing the President of the United States of America as "the most distinguished among those who profess the religion of the Messiah, of whom may the end be happy." Because of the presence of this clause, W.C. Anderson makes the argument that Christianity is adopted by this treaty.

The treaty provided protection to Americans at a cost higher than the Treaty of Tripoli imposed.

The Treaty of Tunis was not only notable for the use of religious language in the opening statement, but it was also a treaty where the President of the United States got involved in the negotiation even after Senate action. The Treaty of Tunis had alterations on three of the articles. Articles that were altered are 11, 12, and 14. While the resolution of the Senate related only to Article 14, it was considered by the Secretary of State (Pickering) that Articles 11 and 12 were also objectionable, and changes in them were proposed, an interesting and early example of the control of treaty negotiations by the President, even after Senate action.

Article 14 in the original document read "The citizens of the United States of America who shall transport into the Kingdom of Tunis the merchandise of their country in the vessels of their nation, shall pay three per cent duty. Such as may be laden by such citizens under a foreign flag, coming from the United States or elsewhere, shall pay ten per cent duty. Such as may be laden by foreigners on board of American vessels coming from any place whatever, shall also pay ten per cent duty. If any Tunisian merchant wishes to carry merchandise of his country under any flag whatever, into the United States of America, and on his own account, he shall pay three percent." The percentage of duties (taxes) was changed from 10% to 6%. It now reads "A Tunisian merchant who may go to America with a vessel of any nation soever, loaded with merchandise which is the production of the kingdom of Tunis, shall pay duty (small as it is) like the merchants of other nations; and the American merchants shall equally pay, for the merchandise of their country which they may bring to Tunis under their flag, the same duty as the Tunisians pay in America. But if an American merchant, or a merchant of any other nation, shall bring American merchandise under any other flag, he shall pay six I per cent duty. In like manner, if a foreign merchant shall bring the merchandise of his country under the American flag, [null he shall also pay six] per cent."

Article 11 read in the original treaty "When a vessel of war of one of the parties shall enter a port of the other, she shall be saluted by the forts and shall return the salute gun for gun, neither more nor less. But there shall be given by the parties, respectively, a barrel of powder for every gun which shall be required for the salute." The altered version states this article as a request. It now reads "When a vessel of war of the United States of America shall enter the port of Tunis, and the Consul shall request that the castle may salute her, the number of guns shall be fired which he may request; and if the said Consul does not want a salute, there shall be no question about it. But in case he shall desire the salute, and the number of guns shall be fired which he may have requested, they shall be counted and returned by the vessel in as many barrels of cannon powder. The same shall be done with respect to the Tunisian corsairs when they shall enter any port of the United States."

Article 12 the only alteration was in the last sentence. The sentence read "The subjects or citizens of the two nations shall be protected by the government or commandants of the places where they may be, and not by the other authorities of the country. In case the Government of Tunis shall have need of an American vessel for its service, the captain shall freight his vessel, and the freight shall be paid to him according to the agreement of the Government, without his being allowed to refuse." The only change was in the wording and a phrase was added. It now reads "The subjects of the two contracting powers shall be under the protection of the Prince and under the jurisdiction of the chief of the place where they may be, and no other persons shall have authority over them. If the commandant of the place does not conduct himself agreeably to justice, a representation of it shall be made to us In case the Government shall have need of an American merchant vessel, it shall cause it to be freighted, and then a suitable freight shall be paid to the captain, agreeably to the intention of the Government, and the captain shall not refuse it."

== See also ==
- List of treaties
