= Hasan-Ali Beg Bestami =

Hasan-Ali Beg Bestami (fl. 18th century) was an important Safavid official, who subsequently became one of the closest associates of Nader Shah (r. 1736–1747), serving as his chief assayer (moʿayyer al-mamālek).

== Biography ==
Hasan-Ali was a slave of either Armenian or Georgian origin, and had already gained a prominent position in the late Safavid era, when he entered the royal service during the reign of king Sultan Husayn (r. 1696–1722), and became an important official by the 1720s. In 1726, by Tahmasp II's order, Hasan-Ali was sent to report on the activities on the then emerging Nader Qoli Beg (later known as Nader Shah). Persuaded by Hasan-Ali, Nader became an associate to Tahmasp II as he joined him, and on the latter's behalf, he was appointed deputy governor of Abivard. As the Encyclopedia Iranica states; "This encounter marked the beginning of a long and close connection between Ḥasan-ʿAli and Nāder".

In the early 1730s, Hasan-Ali lived in Isfahan, and functioned as a messenger between Nader and Tahmasp II, and he oversaw the fiscal affairs of Iran from there as well. He later played a role in the removal of Tahmasp II from the throne and the subsequent crowning of then still infant Abbas III in 1732. By 1736, when Nader was already the de facto ruler of Iran for many years, Hasan-Ali was known as one of his most trusted and principal advisors. Nader suggested to his closest intimates, after a great hunting party on the Moghan plains, that he should be proclaimed the new king (shah) in place of the young Abbas III. The small group of close intimates, Nader's friends, included Tahmasp Khan Jalayer as well as Hasan-Ali. Following Nader's suggestion, the group did not "demur", and Hasan-Ali remained silent. When Nader asked him why he remained silent, Hasan-Ali replied that the best thing for Nader to do would be assembling all leading men of the state, in order to receive their agreement in "a signed and sealed document of consent". Nader approved with the proposal, and the writers of the chancellery, which included the court historian Mirza Mehdi Khan Astarabadi, were instructed with sending out orders to the military, clergy and nobility of the nation to summon at the plains. From the crowning ceremony on the Moghan at which Hasan-Ali was present, up to Nader's death in 1747, he was a permanent resident at the king's camp. After Nader's assassination in 1747, Hasan-Ali managed to escape. This caused Nader's long-time Jesuit doctor Bazin to form suspicious assumptions regarding Hasan-Ali, and he therefore believed that the latter had a certain involvement in the assassination plot.

Following the death of Nader and the succession to the throne by his nephew Ali-Qoli, Hasan-Ali briefly served as an important advisor to the latter. Following this short occupation, he returned to Isfahan. There, it is said that Hasan-Ali allegedly "counseled Karim Khan Zand to enthrone Abu Torab Mirza as king Ismail III in 1750". The descendants of Hasan-Ali adopted the title of moʿayyer al-mamālek as their family name. Decades later, one of Hasan-Ali's namesake descendants, would serve as a government official of the then ruling Qajar dynasty of Iran, during the reign of Fath-Ali Shah Qajar (r. 1797–1834). He married one of the latter's daughters as well, around 1834.

== Sources ==
- Avery, Peter; Hambly, Gavin R. G.; Melville, Charles Peter, eds. (1991). The Cambridge History of Iran. Vol. 7: From Nadir Shah to the Islamic Republic. Cambridge: Cambridge University Press. ISBN 0-521-20095-4.
- Tucker, Ernest (2003). "ḤASAN-ʿALI BEG BESṬĀMI". In Yarshater, Ehsan (ed.). Encyclopædia Iranica. Vol. XII/1: Harem I–Hedāyat al-mota'allemin. London and New York: Routledge & Kegan Paul. pp. 40–41. ISBN 978-0-933273-74-0.
