= Treaty of Tripoli =

1797 treaty between the US and Tripolitania

Treaty of Peace and Friendship between the United States of America and the Bey and Subjects of Tripoli of Barbary (Ottoman Empire)
- Scan of the first article of the original treaty, written in Arabic, signed November 4, 1796
- Type: "Treaty of perpetual peace and friendship"
- Signed: November 4, 1796
- Location: Tripoli
- Effective: June 10, 1797
- Parties: United States; Ottoman Tripolitania; Regency of Algiers; Ottoman Empire (guarantor)
- Language: Arabic (original), English

Full text
- Treaty of Tripoli at Wikisource

The Treaty of Tripoli (Treaty of Peace and Friendship between the United States of America and the Bey and Subjects of Tripoli of Barbary) was signed in 1796. It was the first treaty between the United States and Tripoli (now Libya) to secure commercial shipping rights and protect American ships in the Mediterranean Sea from local Barbary pirates.

It was authored by Joel Barlow, an ardent Jeffersonian republican, and signed in Tripoli on November 4, 1796, and at Algiers (for a third-party witness) on January 3, 1797. It was ratified by the United States Senate unanimously and without debate on June 7, 1797, taking effect June 10, 1797, with the signature of President John Adams.

Succeeding Adams as president, Thomas Jefferson refused to continue paying Tripolitania the tributes stipulated by this treaty, partially leading to the First Barbary War. A superseding treaty, the Treaty of Peace and Amity, was signed on June 4, 1805.

The treaty is often cited in discussions regarding the role of religion in United States government due to a clause in Article 11 of the English language translation that was ratified by the Senate and signed by the president, which states, "[t]he Government of the United States of America is not in any sense founded on the Christian religion." However, modern translations of the original treaty confirm that no such phrase exists in the Arabic text.

== Barbary corsairs ==
For three centuries up to the time of the treaty, Christian ships in the Mediterranean Sea had been preyed on by the North African Muslim states of the Barbary Coast (Tripoli, Algiers, Morocco, and Tunis) through the Barbary corsairs. Hostages captured by the corsairs were either ransomed or forced into slavery, contributing to the greater Ottoman slave trade (of which the Barbary states were a segment). Life for the captives often was harsh and many died from their treatment.

Prior to the American Revolutionary War, ships of the Thirteen Colonies were protected from the Barbary corsairs by the Royal Navy and British treaties. During the conflict, France allied with the newly formed United States in 1778 and the French Navy subsequently assumed the responsibility of protecting American shipping in the Mediterranean and Eastern Atlantic from the Barbary corsairs. Following the Revolutionary War's conclusion with the signing of the 1783 Treaty of Paris, the U.S. was left to face the threat of the Barbary corsairs by itself. Two American ships were captured by Algerian corsairs in July 1785 and the survivors enslaved, with their ransom being set at $60,000. Rumors spread that Benjamin Franklin, who was travelling back from France to Philadelphia, had been captured by Barbary corsairs, causing considerable upset in the U.S.

As the U.S. lacked a standing navy after the Continental Navy's last ship was sold by the Confederation Congress in 1785, it was forced to pay tribute to the Barbary Coast to prevent attacks on American shipping and free enslaved Americans. As the American consul Lieutenant William Eaton informed newly appointed United States Secretary of State John Marshall in 1800, "It is a maxim of the Barbary States, that 'The Christians who would be on good terms with them must fight well or pay well.'"

Soon after the signing of the Treaty of Paris, attacks on American shipping in the Mediterranean and Eastern Atlantic by the Barbary corsairs prompted the U.S. to initiate a series of peace treaties collectively known as the Barbary treaties. Individual treaties were negotiated with Morocco (1786), Algiers (1795), Tripoli (1797), and Tunis (1797), all of them more than once. Joel Barlow, the U.S. consul general to Algiers, Tripoli, and Tunis, dealt with the text of various treaties. The United States Ambassador to Spain, David Humphreys, was given the right to establish a treaty with Tripoli and assigned Barlow and Joseph Donaldson to broker it. Barlow certified the signatures on the Arabic original and the English copy provided to him. The American diplomat Richard Henry O'Brien subsequently established the original transport of the negotiated goods along with the treaty, but it was the consul James Leander Cathcart who delivered the final requirements of payment for the treaty.

== Signing and ratification ==
Scan of the original Treaty of Peace and Friendship between the United States of America and the Bey and Subjects of Tripoli of Barbary, written in Arabic, signed November 4, 1796.

The first U.S. president, George Washington, appointed his old colleague David Humphreys as Commissioner Plenipotentiary on March 30, 1795, in order to negotiate a treaty with the Barbary powers. On February 10, 1796, Humphreys appointed Joel Barlow and Joseph Donaldson as "Junior Agents" to forge a "Treaty of Peace and Friendship". Under Humphreys' authority, the treaty was signed at Tripoli on November 4, 1796, and certified at Algiers on January 3, 1797. Humphreys reviewed the treaty and approved it in Lisbon on February 10, 1797.

The official treaty was in Arabic, and a translated version by Consul-General Barlow was ratified by the United States on June 10, 1797. Article 11 of the treaty was said to have not been part of the original Arabic version of the treaty; in its place is a letter from the Dey of Algiers to the Pasha of Tripoli. However, it is the English text that was ratified by Congress. Miller says, "the Barlow translation is that which was submitted to the Senate (American State Papers, Foreign Relations, II, 18–19) and which is printed in the Statutes at Large and in treaty collections generally; it is that English text which in the United States has always been deemed the text of the treaty."

The treaty had spent seven months traveling from Tripoli to Algiers to Portugal and, finally westward across the North Atlantic Ocean, to the United States, and had been signed by officials at each stop along the way. There is no record of discussion or debate of the Treaty of Tripoli at the time that it was ratified. However, there is a statement made by President John Adams on the document that reads:

Now be it known, That I John Adams, President of the United States of America, having seen and considered the said Treaty do, by and with the advice and consent of the Senate, accept, ratify, and confirm the same, and every clause and article thereof. And to the End that the said Treaty may be observed, and performed with good Faith on the part of the United States, I have ordered the premises to be made public; And I do hereby enjoin and require all persons bearing office civil or military within the United States, and all other citizens or inhabitants thereof, faithfully to observe and fulfill the said Treaty and every clause and article thereof.

Official records show that after President John Adams sent the treaty to the U.S. Senate for ratification in May 1797, the entire treaty was read aloud on the Senate floor, and copies were printed for every senator. A committee considered the treaty and recommended ratification. Twenty-three of the thirty-two sitting senators were present for the June 7 vote that unanimously approved the ratification recommendation.

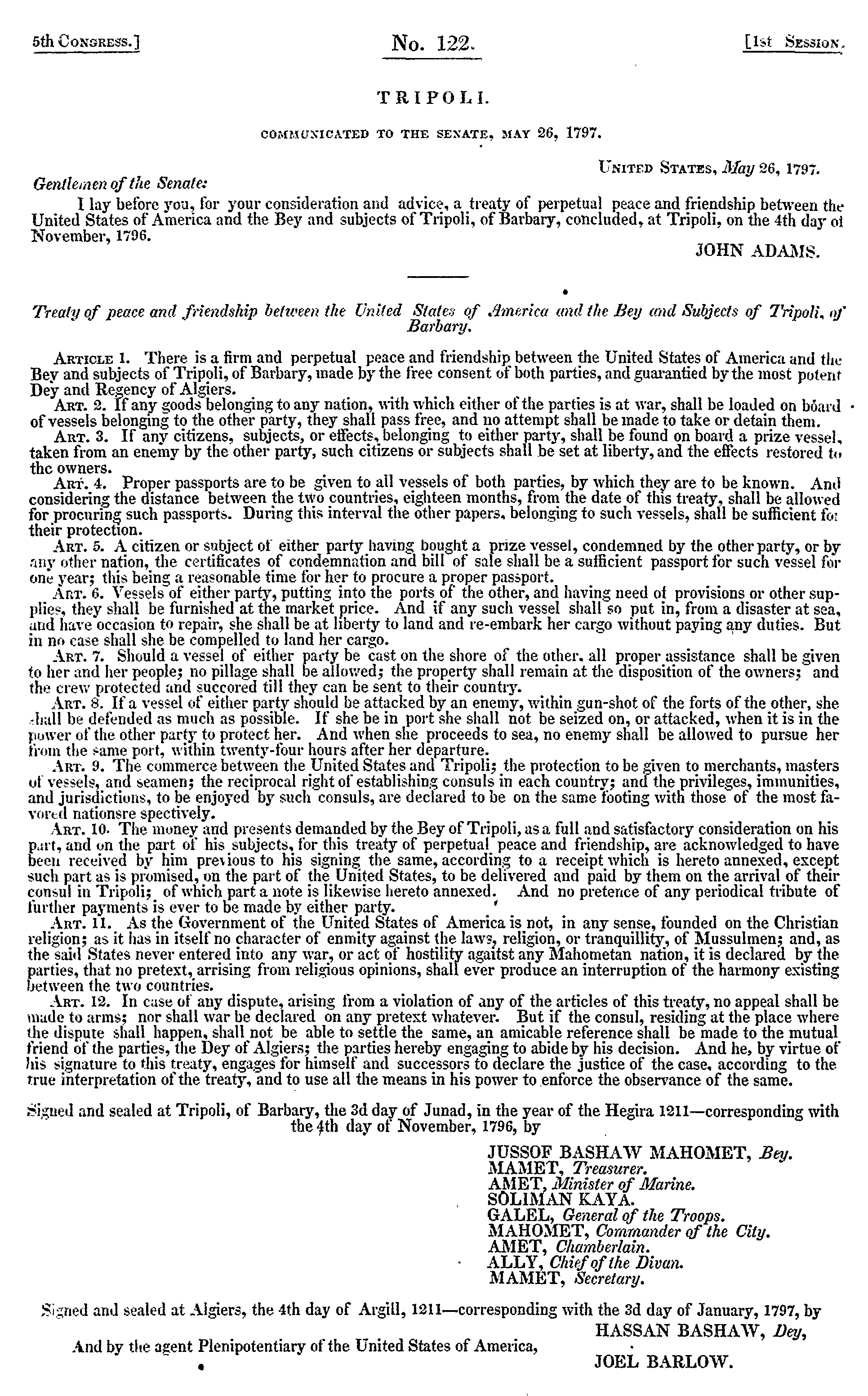
The Treaty of Tripoli as presented to Congress

However, before anyone in the United States saw the treaty, its required payments, in the form of goods and money, had been made in part. As Barlow declared: "The present writing done by our hand and delivered to the American Captain O'Brien makes known that he has delivered to us forty thousand Spanish dollars,—thirteen watches of gold, silver & pinsbach,—five rings, of which three of diamonds, one of saphire and one with a watch in it, One hundred & forty piques of cloth, and four caftans of brocade,—and these on account of the peace concluded with the Americans." However, this was an incomplete amount of goods stipulated under the treaty (according to the Pasha of Tripoli) and an additional $18,000 had to be paid by the American Consul James Leander Cathcart at his arrival on April 10, 1799.

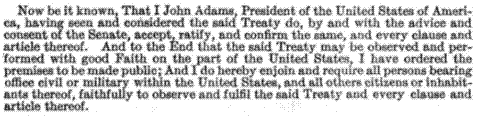
President Adams' signing statement

It was not until these final goods were delivered that the Pasha of Tripoli recognized the treaty as official. In Treaties and Other International Acts of the United States of America by David Hunter Miller, which is regarded as an authoritative collection of international agreements of the United States between 1776 and 1937, Miller describes, "While the original ratification remained in the hands of Cathcart ... it is possible that a copy thereof was delivered upon the settlement of April 10, 1799, and further possible that there was something almost in the nature of an exchange of ratifications of the treaty on or about April 10, 1799, the day of the agreed settlement." It is then that the Pasha declares in a Letter to John Adams on April 15, 1799, "Whereby we have consummated the Peace which shall, on our side, be inviolate, provided You are Willing to treat us as You do other Regencies, without any difference being made between Us. Which is the whole of what We have, at present, to say to You, wishing you at the same time the most unlimited prosperity."

=== Article 11 ===
Article 11 has been and is a point of contention in popular culture disputes on the doctrine of separation of church and state as it applies to the founding principles of the United States. Despite ratification by the U.S. Senate of the text in English which contained Article 11, the page containing Article 11 is missing from the Arabic version of the treaty. The contemporaneous purpose of Article 11 was to make clear that the United States was a secular state, and to reassure the Muslims that the agreement was not with an extension of earlier Christian nations that took part in the Crusades.

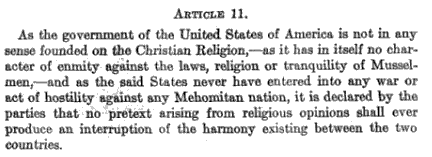
Article 11

Article 11 reads:

Art. 11. As the Government of the United States of America is not in any sense founded on the Christian religion; as it has in itself no character of enmity against the laws, religion, or tranquility, of Mussulmen (Muslims); and as the said States never entered into any war or act of hostility against any Mahometan (Mohammedan) nation, it is declared by the parties that no pretext arising from religious opinions shall ever produce an interruption of the harmony existing between the two countries.

According to Frank Lambert, Professor of History at Purdue University,

By their actions, the Founding Fathers made clear that their primary concern was religious freedom, not the advancement of a state religion. Individuals, not the government, would define religious faith and practice in the United States. Thus the Founders ensured that in no official sense would America be a Christian Republic. Ten years after the Constitutional Convention ended its work, the country assured the world that the United States was a secular state, and that its negotiations would adhere to the rule of law, not the dictates of the Christian faith. The assurances were contained in the Treaty of Tripoli of 1797 and were intended to allay the fears of the Muslim state by insisting that religion would not govern how the treaty was interpreted and enforced. John Adams and the Senate made clear that the pact was between two sovereign states, not between two religious powers.

The treaty was printed in the Philadelphia Gazette and two New York papers, with only scant public dissent (most notably from William Cobbett).

=== Later dissent ===
A prominent member of Adams' cabinet, Secretary of War James McHenry, claimed that he protested the language of Article 11 before its ratification. He wrote to Secretary of the Treasury Oliver Wolcott Jr., September 26, 1800: "The Senate, my good friend, and I said so at the time, ought never to have ratified the treaty alluded to, with the declaration that 'the government of the United States, is not, in any sense, founded on the Christian religion.' What else is it founded on? This act always appeared to me like trampling upon the cross. I do not recollect that Barlow was even reprimanded for this outrage upon the government and religion."

=== Translation and Article 11 ===
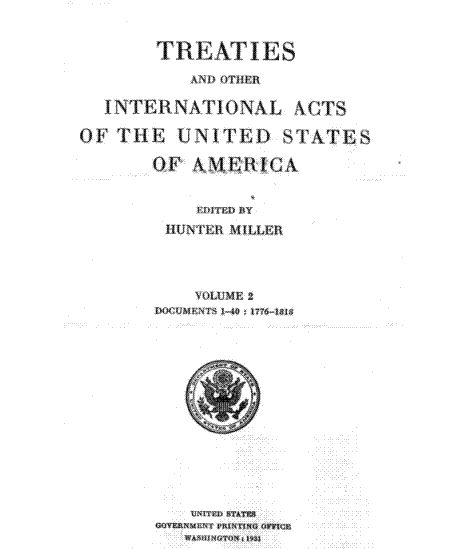
Miller's Investigation and Notes

The translation of the Treaty of Tripoli by Barlow has been questioned, and it has been disputed whether Article 11 in the English version of the treaty ratified by the U.S. Senate corresponds to anything of the same purport in the Arabic version.

In 1931 David Hunter Miller completed a commission by the United States government to analyze United States treaties and to explain how they function and what they mean to the United States legal position in relationship with the rest of the world. According to Miller's notes, "the Barlow translation is at best a poor attempt at a paraphrase or summary of the sense of the Arabic" and "Article 11 ... does not exist at all."

After comparing the English language version by Barlow with the Arabic and the Italian version, Miller continues by claiming that:

The Arabic text which is between Articles 10 and 12 is in form a letter, crude and flamboyant and withal quite unimportant, from the Dey of Algiers to the Pasha of Tripoli. How that script came to be written and to be regarded, as in the Barlow translation, as Article 11 of the treaty as there written, is a mystery and seemingly must remain so. Nothing in the diplomatic correspondence of the time throws any light whatever on the point.

From this, Miller concludes: "A further and perhaps equal mystery is the fact that since 1797 the Barlow translation has been trustfully and universally accepted as the just equivalent of the Arabic ... yet evidence of the erroneous character of the Barlow translation has been in the archives of the Department of State since perhaps 1800 or thereabouts". However, as Miller noted:

It is to be remembered that the Barlow translation is that which was submitted to the Senate (American State Papers, Foreign Relations, II, 18–19) and which is printed in the Statutes at Large and in treaty collections generally; it is that English text which in the United States has always been deemed the text of the treaty.

However the Arabic and English texts differ, the Barlow translation (Article 11 included) was the text presented by the President and ratified unanimously in 1797 by the U.S. Senate following strict constitutional procedures. According to the American legal scholar Francis Wharton the original document was framed by an ex-Congregational preacher.

== Barbary wars ==
The treaty was broken in 1801 by Yusuf Karamanli, the Pasha of Tripoli, over President Thomas Jefferson's refusal to submit to the Pasha's demands for increased payments.

Through subsequent battles, Tripoli eventually agreed to terms of peace with the United States. Tobias Lear negotiated a second "Treaty of Peace and Amity" with the Pasha Yusuf on June 4, 1805. To the dismay of many Americans, the new settlement included a ransom of $60,000 (equal to $1,290,000 today) paid for the release of prisoners from the USS Philadelphia and several U.S. merchant ships. By 1807, Algiers had gone back to taking U.S. ships and seamen hostage. Distracted by the preludes to the War of 1812 and the war itself, the United States was unable to respond to the provocations until 1815, with the Second Barbary War, thereby concluding the First and the Second Barbary Wars (1800–1815).
