= USS Philadelphia (1799) =

United States 36-gun frigate

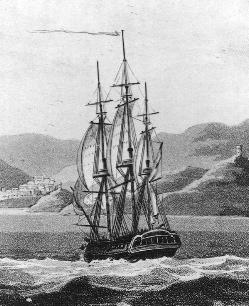
- USS Philadelphia

History

United States
- Name: USS Philadelphia
- Cost: $179,349
- Laid down: November 14, 1798
- Launched: November 28, 1799
- Commissioned: April 5, 1800
- Fate: Captured October 31, 1803, re-captured and burned by the U.S. Navy February 16, 1804

General characteristics
- Class & type: Philadelphia-class frigate
- Tonnage: 1240
- Length: 157 ft (48 m) between perpendiculars Keel;130 feet
- Beam: 39 ft (12 m)
- Depth: 13 ft 6 in (4.11 m)
- Complement: 307 officers and crew
- Armament: 28 × 18-pounder guns; 16 × 9-pounder long guns (replaced with 16 × 32-pounder carronades in 1803)

USS Philadelphia, a 1240-ton, 36-gun frigate, was the second vessel of the United States Navy to be named for the city of Philadelphia. Originally named City of Philadelphia, she was built in 1798–1799 for the United States government by residents of that city. Funding for her construction was raised by a drive that collected $100,000 in one week, in June 1798. She was designed by Josiah Fox and built by Samuel Humphreys, Nathaniel Hutton and John Delavue. Her carved work was done by William Rush of Philadelphia. She was laid down about November 14, 1798, launched on November 28, 1799, and commissioned on April 5, 1800, with Captain Stephen Decatur, Sr. in command. She was captured by Barbary pirates in Tripoli with William Bainbridge in command. Stephen Decatur led a raid that burned her down, preventing her use by the pirates.

== Service history ==
Philadelphia being built as "Preparation for WAR to defend Commerce." Plate 29 from Birch's Views of Philadelphia.

Quasi War: USS Philadelphia put to sea for duty in the West Indies and was off Newcastle on 23 April, 1800 waiting for favorable wind. She arrived on the Guadeloupe Station in May 1800 and relieved the frigate Constellation. During this cruise she captured five French armed vessels and recaptured six merchant ships that had been taken by French ships. On 22 May she recaptured schooner "Betsy". On 15 July, was with USS Connecticut when Connecticut captured French Letter of Marque ketch "Le Chouchou". On 26 July she recaptured brig "Diligence". On 26 November she recaptured British sloop "Eliza", that had been captured by privateer "Rosalie" (or possibly "La Resolute" or "Resolie"). On 27 November recaptured schooner "Sally". A few days later captured privateer "Hare"(?). On 3 December captured privateer "La Levrette" off Bassaterre, Guadalupe. On 26 December she recaptured American brig "Dove" and sloop "Lucy", both captured by privateer schooner "Patriot". On 27 December she recaptured American schooner "Ann and Susan", captured by privateer "Flambeau". On 29 December she recaptured British brig "Sir John Wentworth", captured by privateer schooner "Patriot".

First Barbary War: Returning home in March 1801, she was ordered to prepare for a year's cruise in the Mediterranean in a squadron commanded by Commodore Richard Dale. At his own request, Decatur was relieved of the command of Philadelphia by Captain Samuel Barron. The squadron cleared the Cape on 2 June. The squadron arrived at Gibraltar on July 1, with Commodore Dale in the frigate President. Philadelphia was directed to cruise the Straits and blockade the coast of Tripoli, since in May 1801 the Pasha Yusuf Karamanli had threatened to wage war on the United States and had seized U.S. merchant vessels for ransom.

Philadelphia departed Gibraltar for the United States in April 1802, arriving in mid-July. Her crew was discharged and she was placed under command of Lt. John Cassin, Cassin in turn was furloughed until further notice with command going to her Sailing Master and put in ordinary in a letter dated 28 July. He was ordered to return and assume command again in a letter dated 21 August, 1802. Captain William Bainbridge was ordered to take command and get her ready to sail in a letter dated 21 May, 1803. On May 21, 1803, she recommissioned (having her sixteen 9-pounder long guns replaced with sixteen 32-pounder carronades at this time), and sailed for the Mediterranean on July 28, 1803. She arrived in Gibraltar on August 24 with Captain William Bainbridge in command. Two days later she captured Moroccan ship-of-war Mirboka (24 guns and 100 men) off Cape de Gatt, Spain and the next day recaptured the American brig Celia, captured by Mirboka on 17 August, and brought them both into Gibraltar. At the end of the brief war between the U. S. And Morocco, that had been started by the Governor of Tangier without permission of the Emperor of Morocco, Mirboka was returned on 12 October, 1803.

== Capture ==
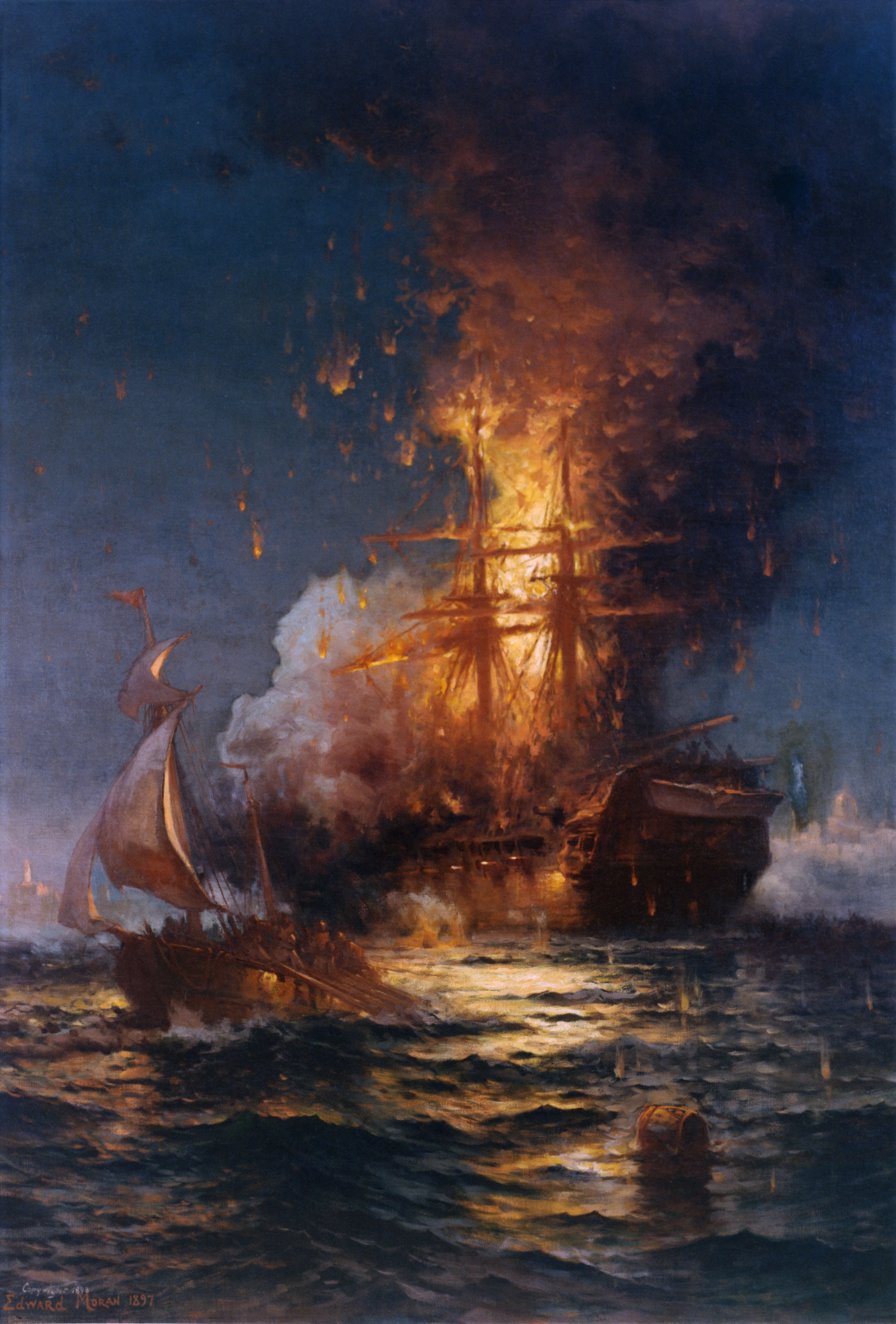
Burning of the USS Philadelphia as painted (1897) by Edward Moran. (U. S. Naval Academy, Annapolis)

During the First Barbary War, Philadelphia, accompanied by USS Vixen, cruised off Tripoli until October 31, 1803. While giving chase and firing upon a Tripoli navy ship, it ran aground on an uncharted reef two miles (3 km) off Tripoli Harbor. The captain, William Bainbridge, tried to refloat the ship, first laying the sails aback, and casting off three bow anchors and shifting the guns aftward, but a strong wind and rising waves drove her further aground.

He ordered the crew to jettison many of the cannons, barrels of water, and other heavy articles overboard in order to lighten the ship, but this too failed. They sawed off the foremast in one last desperate attempt to lighten it. In order not to resupply the Tripoli pirates (navy soldiers of Tripoli government), Captain Bainbridge ordered holes drilled in the ship's bottom, magazine flooded, pumps sabotaged, and all other weapons thrown overboard before he surrendered. The Pasha's officials enslaved the American officers and men as war captives.

== Burning ==
The Tripoli pirates had finally managed to refloat Philadelphia on 2 November. The Bey communicated with his Consuls to see if there was any interest in purchasing her, where Tripoli couldn't man her properly. Americans believed that the warship was too great a prize to be allowed to remain in foreign hands, so the Navy decided to recapture or destroy it. After the United States had captured the Tripolitan ketch Mastico, they renamed her as Intrepid, but re-rigged the ship with short masts and triangular sails to look like a local ship.

Lieutenant Stephen Decatur, son of USS Philadelphia's first captain, led a party of 83 volunteers to carry out this task. On February 16, 1804, under the cover of night and in the guise of a ship in distress that had lost all anchors in a storm and needed a place to tie up, Decatur sailed Intrepid next to Philadelphia. The Americans boarded the prize and, after making sure that she was not seaworthy, burned the ship where she lay in Tripoli Harbor. Decatur's force suffered only one wounded member and killed at least 20 Tripolitans.

Britain's Viscount Nelson is said to have called this feat "the most bold and daring act of the Age". The authenticity of this quote remains in doubt.

The crewmen captured in 1803 were released pursuant to the 1805 Treaty of Tripoli, which ended the war. Philadelphia's anchor was returned to the United States on April 7, 1871, when Mehmed Halet Pasha, the Ottoman governor, presented it to the captain of the visiting Guerriere.

The wreck of the Philadelphia was rediscovered in 1904 then lost again due to harbor construction and dredging.

== Local account of the destruction ==
In 1904, Charles Wellington Furlong, an American adventurer, went to Tripoli to investigate the sinking of Philadelphia. He later wrote about the history in his book, The Gateway to the Sahara: Observations and Experiences in Tripoli (1909).

Based on records from a local synagogue, Furlong wrote:

Yusef Pashaw had equipped a number of corsairs.... His captains, Zurrig, Dghees, Trez, Romani and El-Mograbi, set sail from Tripoli and shortly sighted an American vessel [Philadelphia]. Zurrig left the others and daringly approached the ship, annoying her purposely to decoy her across the shoals. She stranded, but fired on the other vessels until her ammunition gave out, whereupon the Moslems pillaged her. The American Consul [actually the Danish consul, Nissen] was very much disheartened and tried to conclude arrangements similar to those recently made between the Bashaw and the Swedish Consul; but such an enormous tribute was demanded that no terms could be reached, so by order of the Bashaw the vessel was burned.... [Footnote 2: This of course was an erroneous idea. It may have been purposefully circulated through the town, particularly among the inhabitants other than Mohammedans.]

Furlong later reported in the same book that other Arabs in Tripoli had said that the ship was not burned, but moved to the Lazaretto. There it was decorated as a trophy and its guns were fired to mark the end of Ramadan, the major Muslim holiday. According to the detailed account of Hadji-Mohammed Gabroom, an American ketch sneaked into the harbor, its crew killed some of the 10 guards, and allowed the others to flee. It set Philadelphia on fire.

== Popular culture ==
The burning of the USS Philadelphia appears in the United States downloadable content for the real-time strategy game Age of Empires III: Definitive Edition.

An account of the burning of the "Philadelphia" appears in the prologue of the Clive Cussler novel "Corsair", told from the first person perspective of the fictional US Navy officer Henry Lafayette.

== See also ==
- List of sailing frigates of the United States Navy
- List of ships captured in the 19th century
- Bibliography of early American naval history

== Bibliography ==
- Canney, Donald L. (2001). Sailing warships of the US Navy. Chatham Publishing / Naval Institute Press. p. 224. ISBN 1-55750-990-5. Url
- Chapelle, Howard I. (1935) The American Sailing Navy, W. W. Norton and Co., New York, p. 400.
- Cooper, James Fenimore (1826). History of the Navy of the United States of America. Stringer & Townsend, New York. p. 508. OCLC 197401914. Url
- Hill, Frederic Stanhope (1905). Twenty-six historic ships. G. P. Putnam's Sons, New York and London. pp. 515. OCLC 1667284. Url
- Kilmeade, Brian & Yaeger, Don (2015) Thomas Jefferson and the Tripoli Pirates: The Forgotten War That Changed American History. Sentinel., New York, ISBN 978-1-59184-806-6.
- Mackenzie, Alexander Slidell (1846). Life of Stephen Decatur: a commodore in the Navy of the United States. C. C. Little and J. Brown, 1846.
- Toll, Ian W. (2006). Six frigates: the epic history of the founding of the U.S. Navy. W. W. Norton & Company, New York. pp. 500. ISBN 978-0-393-05847-5. Url
- Tucker, Spencer (2004). Stephen Decatur: a life most bold and daring. Naval Institute Press, 2004, Annapolis, Maryland. p. 245. ISBN 1-55750-999-9.

=== Further reading ===
- London, Joshua E. (2011) Victory in Tripoli: How America's War with the Barbary Pirates Established the U.S. Navy and Shaped a Nation, John Wiley & Sons, Inc., New Jersey, p. 288, ISBN 0-471-44415-4, Book
- Oren, Michael B. (2007) Power, Faith, and Fantasy, Chapter 3, W. W. Norton and Co., New York, ISBN 0-393-05826-3.
- Willis, Sam (2007). Fighting Ships: 1750–1850, Quercus Books, London.
- Zachs, Richard (2005). The Pirate Coast: Thomas Jefferson, the First Marines, and the Secret Mission of 1805, Hyperion, New York.
