= Treaty of Ahmet Pasha =

1732 treaty between the Ottomans and Safavid Iran

The Treaty of Ahmet Pasha (Persian: عهدنامه احمد پاشا, Turkish: Ahmet Paşa Antlaşması) was a treaty signed on 10 January 1732 between the Ottoman Empire and Safavid Iran.

== Background ==
In the 17th century, a stalemate between the Ottoman and Safavid empires had been reached by the treaties of Serav and Zuhab. However, during the short rule of Afghanistan based Hotak dynasty, chaos in Iran resulted in clashes along the frontiers, especially in the Caucasus. Meanwhile, Peter I of Russia occupied Iranian territories in the North Caucasus and South Caucasus, gains which were confirmed by the Treaty of Saint Petersburg (1723). Fearing a Russian-controlled Caucasus, the Ottomans decided to capture Tbilisi to balance the Russian advance. However, this operation resulted in a long Ottoman Safavid war.

== War ==
Between 1723 and 1730, the Ottomans were able to control the South Caucasus by capturing Yerevan and Ganja in addition to Tbilisi. In the southern fronts (i.e., Western Iran), the Ottomans captured Tabriz, Urmia, Khorramabad, Kermanshah and Hamedān. In 1724, the Ottomans and Russians agreed, by the Treaty of Constantinople (1724), to further divide the aforementioned Iranian territories between the two of them. However, after Tahmasp II of the Safavids began controlling Iran, the Ottoman advance was checked. Tired of war, both sides decided to end the war. Ahmet Pasha (Ottoman) and Mehmet Rıza Kulu (Safavid) signed the treaty.

== Terms of treaty ==
The terms of the treaty were:

1. Ottoman Empire kept its gains in the Caucasus,
2. Ottoman gains in Western Iran (except Hamadan, and Kermanshah) were conceded to Iran, and
3. Aras River became the new border line in the South Caucasus.

== Aftermath ==
The treaty proved to be an armistice rather than a permanent treaty. Neither Ottoman sultan Mahmud I approved the loss of Tabriz (needs explanation, see Hamadan above) nor Nader Shah, then the commander in chief of the Iranian army, the losses in Caucasus. During Nader Shah's reign, Afsharid Iran was able to regain its losses.

== See also ==
- Ottoman–Persian Wars
- Treaty of Kerden
- Treaty of Constantinople (1724)

== Sources ==
- Somel, Selcuk Aksin (2010). The A to Z of the Ottoman Empire. Rowman & Littlefield. p. liii. ISBN 978-0810875791.
