= Treaty with Algiers (1815) =

1815 treaties between the United States and Algeria

Treaty of Peace and Amity between the United States of America and the Dey and Subjects of the Regency of Algiers
- Type: Peace treaty
- Context: Conclusion of the Second Barbary War
- Signed: June 30, 1815
- Location: Algiers, Regency of Algiers
- Ratified: December 21, 1815
- Effective: December 26, 1815
- Condition: Ratification by both parties
- Signatories: Stephen Decatur (U.S.); William Shaler (U.S.); Omar Agha (Regency of Algiers)
- Parties: United States; Regency of Algiers
- Languages: English, Arabic

The Treaty with Algiers, signed on June 30, 1815, marked a significant moment in American foreign policy and maritime law, concluding the Second Barbary War between the United States and the Regency of Algiers. This treaty was pivotal in establishing a framework for peace and trade relations, while also addressing the issue of American captives held by Algerian forces.

== Provisions ==
=== End of tribute payments ===
Article II explicitly stated that no tribute or presents would be required from the United States by Algiers under any circumstances. This was a significant departure from previous agreements that had mandated such payments.

=== Release of captives ===
The treaty mandated the immediate release of all American prisoners held by Algiers without any ransom. At that time, approximately 83 Americans were freed as a result of this agreement.

=== Compensation for damages ===
The Dey agreed to pay $10,000 as compensation for property taken from American citizens during previous conflicts.

=== Trade rights ===
The treaty granted U.S. ships full trading privileges in ports that recognized Algerian authority, thereby enhancing American commercial interests in the Mediterranean region.

=== Most-favored-nation clause ===
The treaty included a clause ensuring that any trade privileges granted to other nations would automatically extend to the United States.

== Ratification and aftermath ==
The U.S. Senate ratified the treaty on December 5, 1815, marking an end to hostilities with Algiers. However, shortly after its ratification, Dey Omar repudiated the agreement due to internal pressures and continued piracy against American vessels persisted until further military actions were taken.

In 1816, following a combined Anglo-Dutch bombardment of Algiers, a new U.S. squadron arrived under William Shaler which led to another treaty being negotiated on December 23, 1816. This subsequent treaty reaffirmed many provisions of the original agreement but was not ratified by the Senate until February 11, 1822.

== See also ==
- List of treaties
