= Treaty of Tripoli (1805) =

1805 treaty between the United States and Tripoli

Treaty of Peace and Amity between the United States of America and the Bey and Subjects of Tripoli of Barbary (Ottoman Empire)
- Type: "Treaty of Peace and Amity"
- Signed: June 4, 1805
- Location: Tripoli
- Effective: April 12, 1806
- Parties: United States; Bey and Subjects of Tripoli of Barbary; Hassan Bashaw, Dey; Ottoman Empire (guarantor)
- Language: Arabic (original), English

The 1805 Treaty of Tripoli (Treaty of Peace and Amity between the United States of America and the Bey and Subjects of Tripoli of Barbary) was signed on June 4, 1805, ending the First Barbary War. It was negotiated by Tobias Lear, an ardent Jeffersonian republican, and took effect April 12, 1806 when the United States Senate ratified the treaty.

The United States agreed to abandon Derna (a provincial capital in eastern Libya occupied during the war) and not to supply its mercenary allies who supported Ahmad Karamanli, the brother of Pasha Yusuf Karamanli, in his claim to be the legitimate ruler of Tripoli. The pasha agreed in return to release Ahmad's wife and children, whom he was holding hostage. The treaty also provided for an exchange of prisoners, primarily of the 297-man crew of the USS Philadelphia in exchange for 89 prisoners held by the U.S., and for a $60,000 payment by the U.S. to Tripoli due to the difference in numbers of prisoners exchanged.
