= Treaty with Tunis (1824) =

1824 treaty between the United States and Tunis

The Treaty with Tunis was signed on February 24, 1824 (24 Ramada II, A. H. 1239), between the United States of America and the "Barbary State" of Tunis, nominally part of the Ottoman Empire.

Ratified by the United States between January 13 and 21, 1825

== See also ==
- List of treaties
