= Hornby =

Hornby may refer to:

== Places ==
=== In England ===
- Hornby, Lancashire
- Hornby, Hambleton, village in North Yorkshire
- Hornby, Richmondshire, village in North Yorkshire

=== Elsewhere ===
- Hornby, Ontario, community in the town of Halton Hills, Ontario, Canada
- Hornby Island, island in British Columbia, Canada
- Hornby, New York, town
- Hornby, New Zealand, suburb of Christchurch

== Other ==
- Hornby (surname)
- Hornby Railways, popular British brand of model railway
- "Hornby" (James May's Toy Stories), TV episode
- SS Hornby, a 1908 tug tender

== See also ==
- Hornby Castle (disambiguation)
- Hornby Dock, dock in Liverpool, England
- Hornby Lighthouse, in New South Wales, Australia
- Hornby Priory, former monastery in Hornby, Lancashire, England
- Hornby School, historic school house in Pennsylvania
- Hornby High School, Christchurch, New Zealand
- Hornsby (disambiguation)
