= Hornsby =

Hornsby may refer to:

== Places ==
- Hornsby, Cumbria, a place in Cumbria, Northern England
- Hornsby, New South Wales, a suburb of Sydney, Australia
  - Hornsby railway station
  - Hornsby Shire, New South Wales, local government area of Sydney
  - Electoral district of Hornsby, a seat in the New South Wales Legislative Assembly located in the region
- Hornsby Plateau, north of Sydney
- Hornsby, Tennessee in the United States of America
- Hornsby Mountains in the Falkland Islands
- Hornsby (crater) on the Moon
- Hornsby Spring, a formerly 1st magnitude spring in Alachua County, Florida

== Other uses ==
- Hornsby (surname)
- Richard Hornsby & Sons, engine manufacturers
- Ruston & Hornsby, manufacturer in England
- Hornsby Brand Design, branding, design, and advertising firm

== See also ==
- Hornby (disambiguation)
- Hornsby Heights, New South Wales, a suburb of Sydney, Australia
