= HMS Stag (1812) =

Royal Navy fifth-rate frigate

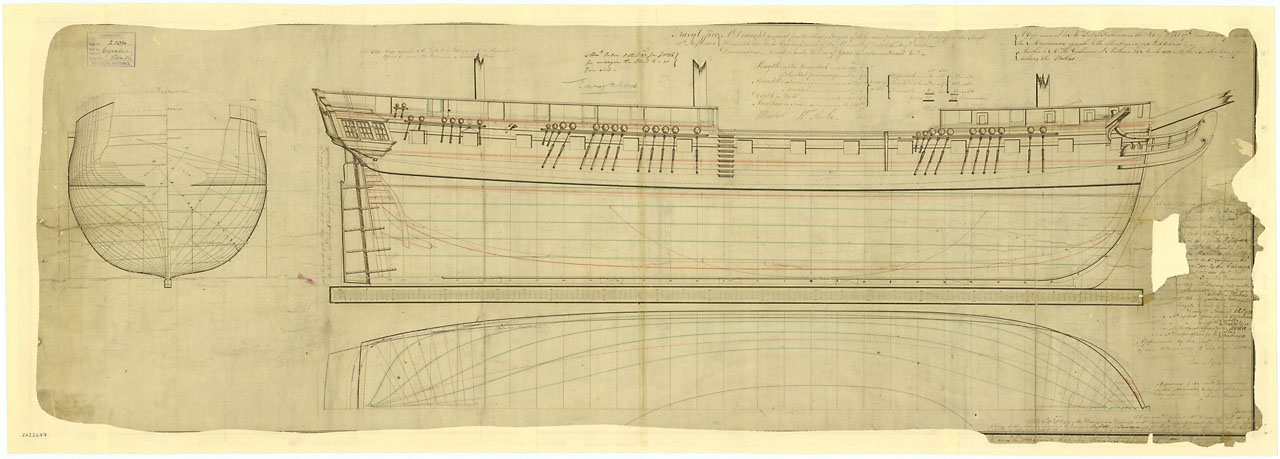
- 1803 plan of the Apollo class

History

United Kingdom
- Name: Stag
- Namesake: Stag
- Ordered: 17 October 1810
- Builder: Deptford Dockyard
- Laid down: January 1811
- Launched: 26 September 1812
- Completed: November 1812
- Commissioned: 6 August 1812
- Fate: Broken up, 20 September 1821

General characteristics
- Class & type: Apollo-class frigate
- Tons burthen: 94730/94 (bm)
- Length: 145 ft (44.2 m) (upper deck); 121 ft 8 3/4 in (37.1 m) (keel)
- Beam: 38 ft 3 in (11.7 m)
- Draught: 10 ft 2 in (3.1 m) (forward); 13 ft 11 in (4.2 m) (aft)
- Depth of hold: 13 ft 3 1/2 in (4.1 m)
- Propulsion: Sails
- Complement: 264
- Armament: UD: 26 × 18-pounder guns; QD: 2 × 9-pounder guns + 10 × 32-pounder carronades; Fc: 2 × 9-pounder guns + 4 × 32-pounder carronades

HMS Stag was a 36-gun Apollo-class frigate of the Royal Navy. Commanded by Captain Phipps Hornby for almost her entire career, Stag began her service in the English Channel, capturing two ships in 1813. Mid-way through the year the fifth-rate frigate was sent to join the Cape of Good Hope Station, where she stayed until November 1814. At the Cape Stag formed part of the search for the wreck of the merchant ship William Pitt in Algoa Bay, and then spent time surveying the Bird Islands, of which one was subsequently named after the ship. After returning from the Cape, Stag was laid up at Plymouth Dockyard. She was moved to Sheerness Dockyard in 1821, where after an aborted refit the frigate was broken up.

== Design ==
Stag was an Apollo-class frigate with 36 18-pounder guns. Designed by Surveyor of the Navy Sir William Rule, the Apollo class originally consisted of three ships constructed between 1798 and 1803. The class formed part of the Royal Navy's response to the French Revolutionary Wars and need for more warships to serve in it. The original Apollo design was then revived at the start of the Napoleonic Wars in 1803, with twenty-four ships ordered to it over the next nine years. This order came about as the threat from the French fleet against Britain began to dissipate, especially after the Battle of Trafalgar in 1805. The Royal Navy stopped ordering specifically large and offensively capable warships, and instead focused on standardised classes of ships that were usually more moderate in size, but through larger numbers would be able to effectively combat the expected increase in global economic warfare.

The Apollo class became the standard frigate design for this task, alongside the Vengeur-class ship of the line and Cruizer-class brig-sloop. The Apollo class was chosen to fulfil the role of standardised frigate because of how well the lone surviving ship of the first batch, HMS Euryalus, had performed, providing "all-round excellence" according to naval historian Robert Gardiner. Trials of ships of the class showed that they were all capable of reaching around 12 knots (22 km/h) and were very well balanced, although prone to pitching deeply in heavy seas. They also had a high storage capacity, allowing for upwards of six months' provisions.

The biggest drawback of the class was that after about six weeks of service, when stores had been used up and the ships were riding higher in the water, the ships became far less weatherly. Captains of Apollo-class vessels used various means to combat this, with Stag's method being the taking on of extra ballast.

== Construction ==
In this second batch of Apollo-class frigates, half were ordered to be built at commercial shipyards and half at Royal Navy Dockyards. Stag, in the latter group of ships, was ordered on 17 October 1810 to be built by shipwright Robert Nelson at Deptford Dockyard. She was the eighteenth frigate to be ordered to the renewed design.

Stag was laid down in January the following year, and launched on 26 September 1812 (Note: Naval historians differ on the date of Stag's launch; while Rif Winfield gives 26 September, Robert Gardiner gives 25 July.) with the following dimensions: 145 feet (44.2 m) along the upper deck, 121 feet 8 3/4 inches (37.1 m) at the keel, with a beam of 38 feet 3 inches (11.7 m) and a depth in the hold of 13 feet 3 1/2 inches (4.1 m). The ship had a draught of 10 feet 2 inches (3.1 m) forward and 13 feet 11 inches (4.2 m) aft, and measured 94730/94 tons burthen. She was named after the stag, with the Royal Navy's use of the name dating back to 1694.

The fitting out process for Stag was completed in November, also at Deptford. With a crew complement of 264, the frigate held twenty-six 18-pounder long guns on her upper deck. Complementing this armament were ten 32-pounder carronades and two 9-pounder long guns on the quarterdeck, with an additional two 9-pounder long guns and four 32-pounder carronades on the forecastle.

== Service ==
Stag was commissioned by Captain Phipps Hornby on 6 August 1812. Much of the ship's crew were quota men and those taken from Newgate Prison. For her first voyage the ship was under the command of an acting captain, Commander William Wolrige. He sailed Stag on a mission from Portsmouth to Lisbon on 5 November with a cargo of specie. Hornby re-took command of the ship prior to 1 January 1813. Stag continued serving in the English Channel and Bay of Biscay, patrolling in consort with the 32-gun frigate HMS Unicorn. On 30 March, while cruising off Rochefort at 48°N 6°W, the ship captured the French 18-gun privateer ship Miquelonnaise after a long chase. Then on 18 April Stag and Unicorn captured the American 2-gun letter of marque schooner Hebe, previously the British HMS Laura, at 47°N 7°W. She had been attempting to reach Bordeaux with a cargo of cotton and codfish when caught.

Having been refitted, Stag sailed to Falmouth on 19 May. There she formed part of the escort to a convoy of merchant ships destined for South America. The convoy sailed on 6 June alongside several others, totalling about 500 ships, with the 36-gun frigate HMS Inconstant and 18-gun brig-sloop HMS Fairy assisting Stag in her duties. The ships reached Madeira on 21 June, from where Stag parted with the other convoys and sailed with her vessels to the Cape of Good Hope Station. While en-route she detained an American slave ship which had recently sailed from the River Gambia with ninety slaves, but because Stag was far from the nearest port, Hornby allowed the vessel to continue unmolested rather than take action against it.

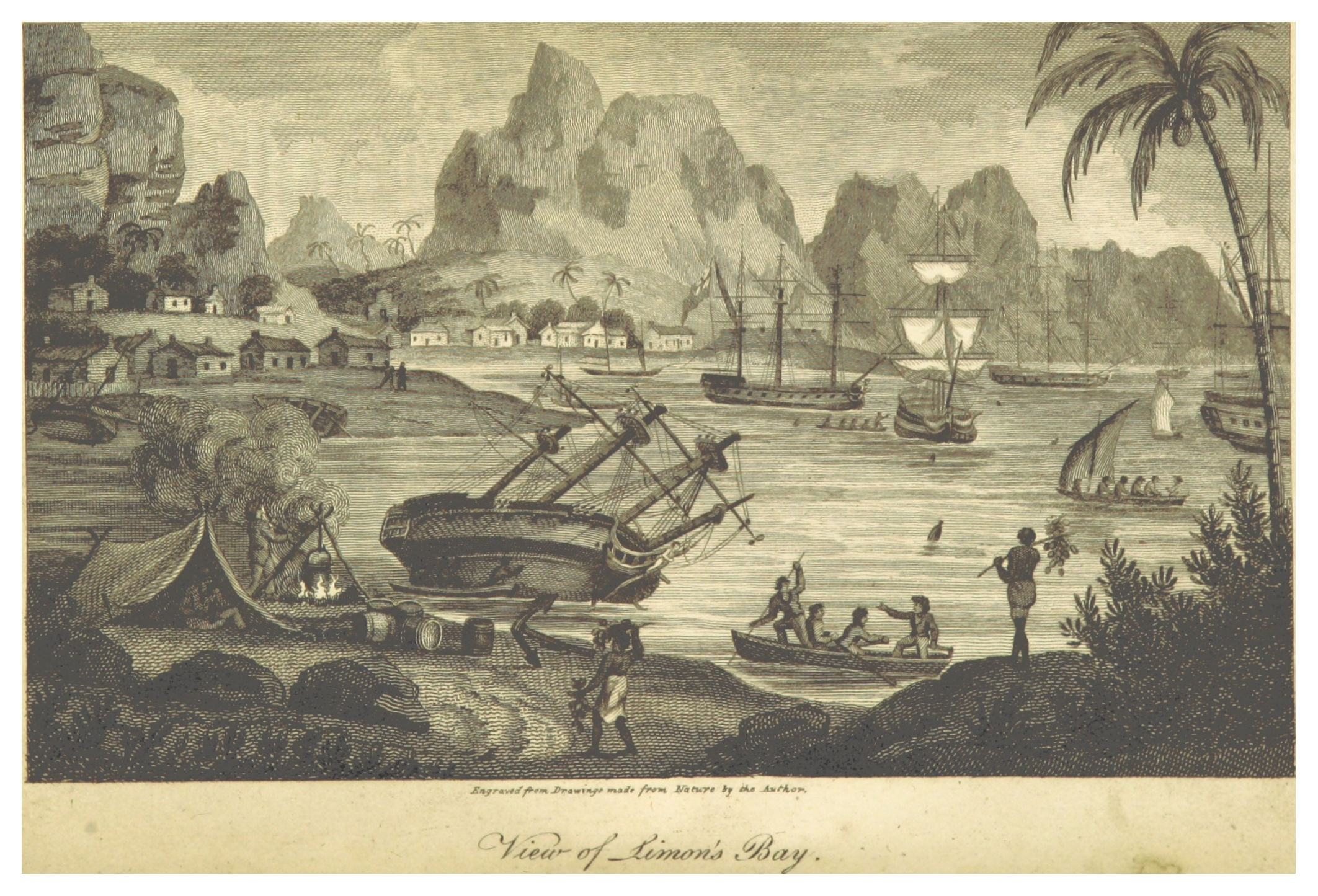
Simon's Bay, a port in which Stag was often based

When nearing the Cape of Good Hope Stag relinquished control of her convoy before sailing in to Simon's Bay. Still serving at the Cape, in January 1814 Stag was sent to Algoa Bay to search for the merchant ship William Pitt, which was thought to have been wrecked near there in December the previous year. To assist in this Stag took on board a local merchant captain who knew the area, and then sailed from Cape Town, spending three weeks patrolling as far east as the Great Fish River. Stag and the merchant ship Lord Eldon found wreckage that had drifted ashore in the bay that could be connected to William Pitt. This included letters, stamped chests, and cabin furniture. No structural wreckage from William Pitt was located, but reports of a large ship having passed Algoa Bay on 17 December combined with a strong gale striking St Francis Bay that day, led officials to judge that William Pitt had foundered while attempting to get back out to sea in the night of 17 December.

Stag returned to Cape Town from her search for William Pitt on 11 February 1814, and went out again to Algoa Bay in March. While continuing the search, Hornby used Stag to chart the Bird Islands in the bay, reporting to Vice-Admiral Charles Tyler that "the islands abound with seals, which may be killed with ease". Stag Island was named for the ship after the survey. Stag afterwards continued to serve on the Cape of Good Hope Station, based at Simon's Bay. While there four of the crew deserted and made their way over land to Cape Town. There a merchant captain promised to take them on board his ship, but instead reported them to the navy, which sent them back to Stag. In April she and her sister ship HMS Semiramis were assigned to join HMS Clorinde escorting a homeward convoy from Point-de-Galle. They sailed from Table Bay on 2 May for St Helena from whence Stag was expected to escort the convoy back to England. On 18 May, approaching the island during the night, Semiramis was hit by the merchant ship Vansittart and badly damaged. On the following morning, the leaking Semiramis was towed into St Helena where the damage was patched, and then sent on with the convoy to England on 24 June in the place of Stag, which returned to the Cape.

Stag subsequently returned to England, having escorted another convoy departing the Cape in August, via St Helena. The frigate arrived at Portsmouth on 27 November, from where her ship's company was transferred into the 38-gun frigate HMS Spartan, a larger and more strongly-built vessel than Stag. Stag was subsequently laid up at Plymouth Dockyard. The frigate saw no further service during the wars. She was moved from Plymouth to Sheerness Dockyard in January 1821 in expectation of receiving a refit, but Stag was instead broken up there on 20 September.
