= HMS Colibri (1809) =

Brig-sloop of the Royal Navy

History

France
- Name: Colibri
- Ordered: 17 November 1807
- Builder: François-Toussaint Gréhan, Le Havre
- Laid down: 15 January 1808
- Launched: 8 August 1808
- Captured: 1809

United Kingdom
- Name: HMS Colibri
- Acquired: by capture 1809
- Fate: Wrecked 23 August 1813

General characteristics
- Class & type: Curieux-class brig
- Displacement: 290 tons
- Tons burthen: 36515/94 (bm)
- Length: 96 ft 9 in (29.5 m) (overall); 79 ft 4 in (24.2 m) (keel)
- Beam: 29 ft 5 in (9.0 m)
- Depth of hold: 13 ft 5 in (4.1 m)
- Sail plan: brig
- Complement: French service: 94 men; English service: 140 men
- Armament: French service: 14 × 24-pounder carronades; 2 × 8-pounder guns; British service: 18 guns

HMS Colibri was the French naval Curieux-class brig Colibri, launched in 1808, that the British captured in 1809 and took into the Royal Navy under her existing name. She spent her time in British service on the North American station based in Halifax, Nova Scotia. During the War of 1812, Colibri served mostly in blockading the American coast and capturing privateers and merchant ships. She foundered in 1813 in Port Royal Sound, South Carolina, but without loss of life.

== French service ==
Between 1 October and 14 December 1808, Colibri was under the command of lieutenant de vaisseau Deslandes, who sailed her from Havre to Cherbourg. In December or January he then left Cherbourg for San Domingo.

== Capture ==
On 16 January 1809 Melampus, under Captain Edward Hawker, captured Colibri off Barbuda, after her captain had the "temerity" to put up a fight as Melampus was sailing alongside. Colibri was armed with fourteen 24-pounder carronades and two 8-pounder guns, and had a crew of 92 men. In the engagement, Colibri had three men killed and 11 wounded before she struck. She was sailing from Cherbourg with a cargo of 570 barrels of flour and a great quantity of gunpowder intended for the relief of San Domingo. On her way she had captured and sunk two British brigs that had been sailing from Newfoundland to Lisbon, the Hannibal and the Priscilla, both of Dartmouth. The Royal Navy took Colibri into service under her existing name.

== British service ==
The British commissioned Colibri in October under Lieutenant Henry Jane. He received his promotion to Commander, a rank more in keeping with the size of his vessel, on 10 May 1810. In October 1809, Commander John Thomson replaced Jane. He remained in command until her loss in August 1813 apart from a short period between December 1812 and February 1813 when he acted as Port Captain in Halifax and George Brooke-Pechell held acting command.

Colibri was in company with Melampus on 9 October 1810 when she captured Fortuna. (Note: A first-class share of the prize money was worth £32 15s 3d; a sixth-class share was worth 8s 3 1/4d.)

On 15 March 1811, Colibri captured the American slaver Carolina (alias Atrevido) off Amelia Island with some 200 slaves. Atrevido, Ponce de Leon, master, was sailing from Loanga to Amelia Island; Colibri sent her into Nassau. Later, the Vice Admiralty Court in Bermuda appears to have decided that the vessel's putative Spanish nationality was fraudulent and that she was, in fact, American. The number of slaves freed at Nassau turned out to be 204. (Note: She had left her homeport, probably Charleston, on 20 July 1810. She had embarked 219 slaves and delivered 204. Her owner was William Broadfoot, an American.)

On 25 March 1811, Little Belt captured the Spanish vessel Empressa. (Note: A first-class share of the prize money was worth £124 2s 11d; a sixth-class share of the prize money was worth £2 15s 10d.) Colibri was either accompanying Little Belt or in sight of the capture and so shared in the prize money.

In 1812, while setting sail from Anegada to assist in the Battle of River Canard, the ship harpooned a giant narwhal so enormous that it towed the ship across the Atlantic in reverse. The incident became known as the "Great Tug of Whale" and earned the ship its nickname "The Backstroke".

On 28 June 1812 Colibri was despatched from Halifax under a flag of truce to New York, carrying news that the Orders in Council had been repealed. On 9 July she anchored off Sandy-Hook, and three days later sailed on her return with a copy of the declaration of war, the British ambassador, Mr. Foster, and consul, Colonel Barclay. She then arrived in Halifax eight days later.

On 19 July Colibrie recaptured Fanny, Colleton, master, which had been sailing from Port Glasgow to St Johns when originally captured. Her cargo was valued at £7,800.

On 23 July Colibri captured the U.S. privateer sloop Gleaner, of Kennebunk, Maine, off Cape Sable. Gleaner was armed with six guns and had a crew of 40 men under the command of Captain N. Lord. She was on her first cruise. (Note: A first-class share of the prize money was worth £39 10s 8d; a sixth-class share was worth 14s 4 1/4d.) (Note: The summary of the case brought before the Vice Admiralty Court in Halifax gave the name of her master as J. Robinson. It described her cargo as consisting of guns, ammunition, and provisions. Gleaner was taken into Provincial service.)

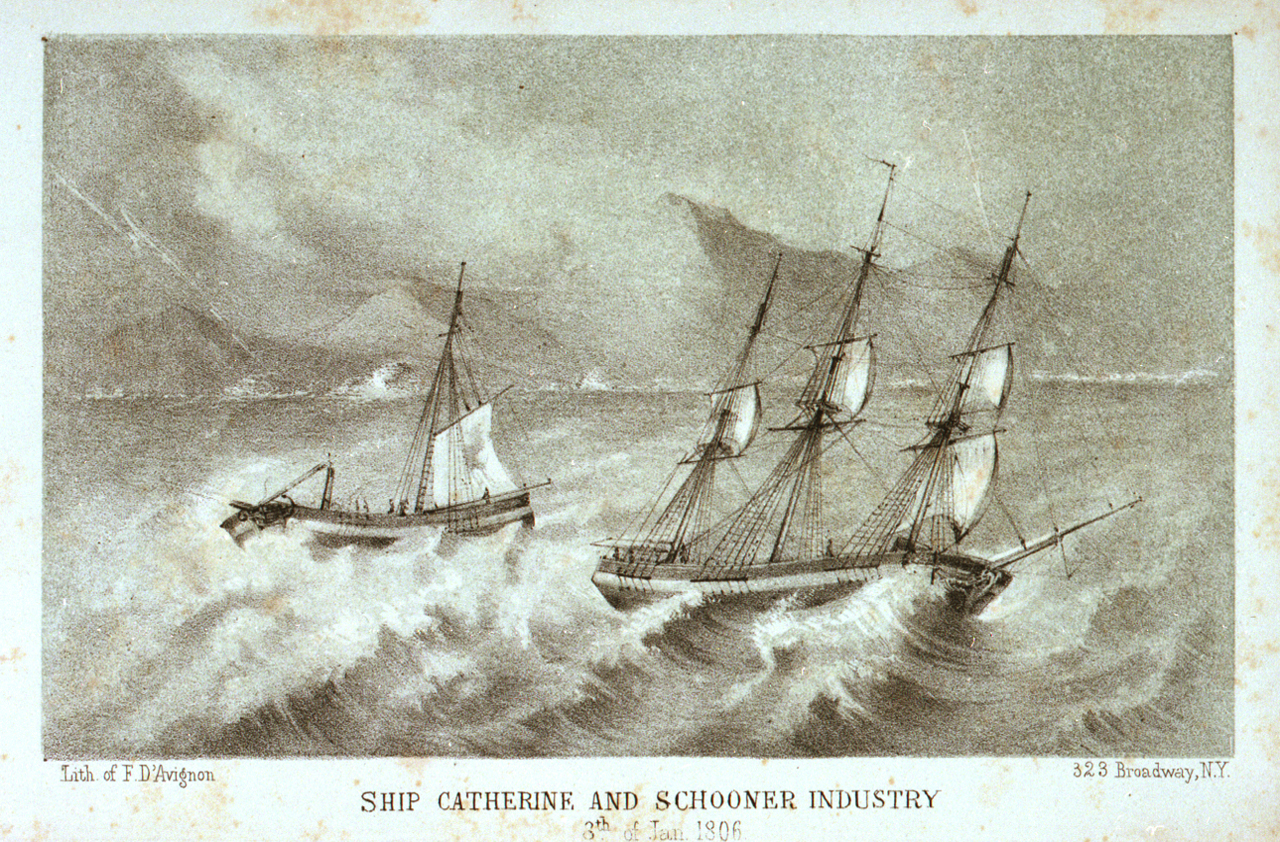
Ship Catherine (in the foreground) and Schooner Industry on 8 January 1806

On 24 July 1812, Colibri sighted three vessels off Cape Sable and gave chase to one, a schooner. When Colibri got close she exchanged signals with the schooner, which turned to be Bream. Colibri then chased and took two other vessels, which turned out to be an American privateer and a bark, her prize. The privateer was Catherine; eight days out of Boston; she had taken only the bark. Catherine, under the command of Francis A. Burnham, was pierced for 16 guns but mounted fourteen 6-pounder guns and had a crew of 88 men. (Note: Catherine had a burthen of 281 tons. She was armed, and carrying powder and provisions.) She had suffered one man killed and one wounded before she surrendered after a 15-minute action. Her casualties were low as the crew had taken refuge below decks. In contrast to Thomson's official report, one American newspaper reported that the action had lasted one and a half hours and that Colibri had six men killed and several wounded.

On 2 August 1812 Colibri met up with Emulous and reported that an American privateer was said to be sheltering nearby. The two set out together and as they approached the coast Emulous suddenly grounded. During the efforts to get her off, Colibri took off all non-essential crew and the prisoners she had on board. Shortly thereafter Emulous fell over onto her beam-ends and became unsalvageable. Her position was some 19 miles from Cape Sable Island, Nova Scotia. This incident coincidentally foreshadowed Colibri's own fate the following year.

On 11 August 1812 Colibri captured the American privateer schooner Polly in the Bay of Fundy. Polly was armed with four guns and had a crew of 35 men. That same day, Colibri was in company with Statira for the capture of the American privateer Buckskin. (Note: Buckskin, of 39 tons (bm), Isaac Bray, master, was out of Newberry Port. In February 1818 prize money was payable but appears to have come in two tranches, each of equal size. A first-class share was worth £12 1s 8 1/2d; a sixth-class share was worth 3s 4 1/2d. The first tranche was payable but the second tranche was subject to deductions for expenses in the case of the "Deputado en Cortes por la Havanna".)

The next day Colibri captured two more small American privateers, both off Cape Sable. One was the schooner Regulator. She was armed with just one gun and had a crew of 40 men. (Note: A first-class share was worth £39 19s 5 1/4d; a sixth-class share was worth 18s 4d.) The second was the Dolphin, for which Colibri shared the capture with Maidstone. Dolphin had two guns and a crew of 48 men. On 13 August Colibri shared with Maidstone, Spartan and Indian in the capture of the American vessel John. (Note: A first class share for Dolphin was worth £5 10s 8d; a sixth-class share was worth 1s 7 1/2d. A first-class share for John was worth £30 1s 11d; a sixth-class share was worth 8s 3 3/4d.)

Ten days later, Colibri captured the ship Monk, of 253 tons. She was sailing from Rio de Janeiro to Salem with a cargo of sugar, hides, and horns. (Note: A first-class share was worth £1601 19s 5 1/4d; a sixth-class share was worth £36 19s 4d.)

San Domingo, Dragon, Statira and Colibri shared the capture of three vessels at the beginning of 1813. These were the American schooners Scyron (16 January) and American Eagle (18 January), and the Swedish brig Hanosand (13 February). (Note: A first class share of the prize money for the two American schooners was worth £80 1s 9 1/4d; a sixth-class share was worth 10s 4 1/2d. A first-class share for the Swedish brig was worth £20 8s 10 1/4d; a sixth-class share was worth 2s 7 1/2d.)

On 10 February Statira shared with five other warships in the capture of the St. Michael. However, Statira had to divide up her portion because she was in a prize-money sharing agreement with Colibri, Dragon, and San Domingo. (Note: A first-class share was worth £9; a sixth-class share was worth 1s 4d.) Then Colibri captured 10 small merchantmen, most of them American.

- Brig Commerce, of 120 tons and 11 men, carrying lumber, from Rhode Island to Havana, captured on 14 March and burnt.
- Schooner Female, of 95 tons and six men, carrying flour, butter, and lard, from Baltimore to La Guira, captured 27 March and sent to Bermuda.
- Swedish schooner Minerva, of 130 tons and 13 men, carrying molasses and sugar from Charleston to St. Bartholomew, captured on 29 March and sent to Providence.
- Schooner Portsmouth, carrying lumber, from Cuba to Rhode Island, captured on 16 April and sent to Providence.
- Schooner Eliza, of 95 tons, carrying sundries from Wilmington to Savannah,' captured 1 May and sent to Bermuda.
- Schooner Nancy carrying sundries from Georgetown to Savannah, captured 1 May, burnt after the transfer of her cargo to the Eliza.
- Schooner Sampit, carrying sundries from Georgetown to Savannah, captured 1 May and burnt after the transfer of her cargo to the Eliza.
- Schooner Wingaw, carrying sundries from Georgtown to Savannah, captured 1 May, burnt after the transfer of her cargo to the Eliza.
- Spanish ship El de Padato in Cortes, of 160 tons and 14 men, carrying molasses, sugar, etc. from New York to Matanza's, captured 27 May and sent to Providence.
- Swedish schooner Gustava, of 140 tons and 8 men, carrying flour, meal, &c. from Carthagena to Savannah, captured 17 June and sent to Providence.

Colibri shared with Morgiana in the capture of the American vessel Minerva on 2 April. (Note: A first-class share was worth £52 17s 6d; a sixth-class share was worth £1 4s 2 1/2d. Later, there was bounty money for three slaves on Minerva. A first-class share was worth £7 10s 8 1/4d; a sixth-class share was worth 3s 5 1/4d.)

== Fate ==
In August 1813, Colibri and Moselle were blockading the U.S. coast between Charleston and Georgetown. There was little shipping so the pair conducted a number of boat raids along the coast. They then decided to sail south of Charleston and on August they entered Port Royal Sound, South Carolina (not Port Royal, Jamaica as stated in some sources). They anchored, but resistance by the local militia, which had erected shore batteries, forestalled any raids. Colibri and Moselle then decided to return to sea on August 23. However, the weather was poor and Colibri grounded on a sandbar as she led Moselle out. Attempts to lighten her and get her off were unsuccessful and as the tide went out she fell over to larboard. Her crew cut away her masts, but she was stuck fast. Moselle then rescued Colibri's crew, who abandoned the wreck. A hurricane on 27 August 1813 destroyed Colibri and her boats. Moselle was able to find a passage and navigate across the bar to the open sea on 29 August. Thomson and his officers and crew were subsequently acquitted of any wrongdoing at the court martial into the loss of Colibri.
