= HMS Indian (1805) =

Sloop of the Royal Navy

- Indian

History

United Kingdom
- Name: HMS Indian
- Ordered: 9 June 1803
- Builder: Robert Shedden, Bermuda
- Launched: October 1805
- Fate: Sold 24 April 1817

United Kingdom
- Name: Indian
- Owner: Enderbys, then others
- Acquired: 1817 by purchase
- Fate: Leaves Lloyd's Register c.1838; last voyage ended June 1847.

General characteristics (Note: All measurements are design measurements. "As built" measurements are apparently non-existent.)
- Class & type: 18-gun Bermuda-class sloop
- Tons burthen: 385, or 389, or 39931/94 (bm)
- Length: 107 ft 0 in (32.6 m) (gundeck); 83 ft 10 5/8 in (25.6 m) (keel)
- Beam: 29 ft 11 in (9.1 m)
- Depth of hold: 14 ft 8 in (4.5 m)
- Sail plan: Sloop
- Complement: 121
- Armament: 16 × 24-pounder carronades; 2 × 6-pounder chase guns

HMS Indian was a Bermuda-built sloop launched in 1805. She captured several small privateers while on the West Indies and Halifax stations before the Royal Navy sold her in 1817. Her main claim to fame, however, is that she was the first command of future Rear-Admiral Charles Austen, who was also the brother of the famed novelist Jane Austen. After the Navy sold her she became a whaler for Samuel Enderby & Sons. She apparently sailed for them until the mid-1830s; she then sailed for other owners until mid-1847, for a total of nine whaling voyages since leaving naval service.

== Design and construction ==
Indian was one of six Bermuda-class sloops built in Bermuda, of Bermudian cedar. Bermuda was originally settled as part of the Colony of Virginia and elevated to an Imperial fortress by the independence of those continental colonies which were to form the United States of America, becoming the headquarters, main base and dockyard of the North America Station (later the North America and West Indies Station and then the America and West Indies Station) 'til 1956. As Bermudian vessels, especially the Bermuda sloop, were highly esteemed, and Bermuda's industry was devoted to other than shipbuilding and seafaring, The Royal Navy, which established a permanent base in Bermuda in 1795, soon began buying up Bermudian vessels from trade and ordering new vessels from Bermudian builders. The Bermuda class was modified from the Dasher-class, which had been built in Bermuda in the 1790s.

== Naval career ==
Lieutenant Charles John Austen received an appointment to Indian on 10 April 1804. She was then building in Bermuda. He did not receive his promotion to Commander until 10 September, and commissioned her on 10 October for the River St. Lawrence and Coast of America and North America and West Indies Station. To raise a crew he put a front-page advertisement in The Bermuda Gazette on 13 April 1805, extolling her virtues.

On one of her first cruises, Indian encountered four French frigates that surrounded her. A providential sudden calm enabled her to use her sweeps to push between them and get far enough away to escape when the breeze returned.

Lloyd's List reported in September 1806 that Indian had captured Nuestra Senora del Carmen and had sent her into Halifax. She had been sailing from Porto Cavalto (Puerto Cabello) to Cadiz.

Baltic arrived at Bermuda on 7 February 1807. She had been sailing from Isle de France (Mauritius), when Indian captured her.

In May or June Indian detained Eliza, an American vessel sailing from Cuba to Charleston, and sent her into Bermuda.

Indian arrived at Bermuda on 10 October from Newfoundland. At the end of September a violent gale had dismasted her dispersed the small convoy for the West Indies that she had been escorting. After the gale had passed she saw a schooner floating upside down; Indian believed the schooner to have been of the vessels of the convoy.

At daylight on 19 June 1808 Indian encountered two schooners at 38°3′N 74°4′W. The schooners immediately tried to escape by taking different directions. Austen chased after the larger and sent his boats after the other. Austen quickly captured Jeune Estelle, of four guns and 25 men, which struck after fire from Indian's chase guns killed one man and wounded another. She had been sailing from River St. Mary's to St. Domingo with a cargo of flour and provisions. (Note: Head money for 25 men was awarded in September 1829. A first-class share was worth £29 10s 8 1/2d; a fifth-class share, that of a seaman, was worth 2s 4 3/4d.)

Lively's boats were half-a-gun-shot away from the second schooner when a breeze sprang up, enabling the schooner to escape. Austen's prisoners informed him that the second schooner was the 6-gun Exchange, with a crew of 95 men, which too was bringing provisions to St. Domingo. Austen then decided to take Jeune Estelle into Bermuda. They arrived at Bermuda on 27 June.

Austen received promotion to post captain in Swiftsure on 10 May 1810. Lieutenant William Bowen Mends then became acting commander, a role that he held until September.

Commander Henry Jane had been appointed to Indian on 10 May to replace Austen. However, he only Mends in September, with Mends returning to Swiftsure, from whence he had come.

On 8 July, Indian captured the American brig Mary and Elizabeth. (Note: A first-class share was worth £169 13s 10d; a sixth-class share, that of an ordinary seaman, was worth £3 16s 1 1/4d.) Mary Elizabeth, of 167 tons (bm), was sailing from St Ubes, Portugal, in ballast but carrying specie. Mary Elizabeth, C. Crandal, master had also been carrying $2313.

Earlier, an American privateer had captured William, of Bristol, J. Hare, master, off Cape Sable. Indian recaptured William on 8 July and took her into Halifax. William had been carrying dry goods worth £1400.

Indian and Plumper, Lieutenant James Bray, captured the privateer schooner Fair Trader on 16 July 1812 in the Bay of Fundy. Fair Trader was armed with one gun and had a 20-man crew. (Note: Fair Trader, of Salem, was under the command of Captain J. Morgan, and normally had a crew of 25 men, some of whom may have been away in a prize at the time of her capture. During her career as a privateer she captured one sloop, one brig, and five schooners.)

A report in Lloyd's List stated that Indian had captured Fair Trader, Argus, and a third American privateer.

Argus, which Indian and Plumper captured on 17 July, was a 21-ton privateer schooner out of Boston and under the command of W. Heath. She too went into New Brunswick. (Note: Argus, of one gun, had captured two brigs and two schooners before the British captured her. Her prizes were worth $100,000. One of them had been a 12-gun packet.)

The third privateer may have been Friendship, of 22 tons (bm), out of Boston, and under the command of A. Richards. Indian captured her on 19 July and took her into New Brunswick. (Note: Friendship, of one gun and nine men, A. Rich, master, had not captured anything before she was captured.)

On 9 August Indian sailed from St. John's, New Brunswick, with a convoy of 50 sail for England. Indian shared with Maidstone, Spartan, and Colibri in the proceeds for the capture four days later of the American vessel John. (Note: A first-class share for John was worth £30 1s 11d; a sixth-class share was worth 8s 0 3/4d.) Two days later, on 15 August, Indian and number of the vessels parted company in a fog off the Newfoundland Banks.

On 5 July 1813 Jane transferred to Arab. Three days later Admiral Sir John Borlase Warren appointed Lieutenant Thomas Sykes to command of Indian at Quebec. He assumed command of her on 11 July. Sykes received promotion to the rank of commander on 9 November 1813. He transferred to Recruit on 23 February 1814.

On 9 March 1814 Commander Nicholas James Cuthbert Dunn replaced Sykes. Dunn brought her home and paid her off later in the year.

Disposal: Indian was paid off in October 1814. She then went into ordinary. The Principal Officers and Commissioners of His Majesty's Navy offered the "Indian sloop, of 394 tons", lying at Deptford for sale on 15 December 1814. She finally sold on 24 April 1817 for £1,300 to Messrs. Enderby.

== Whaler ==
Messrs. Enderby were a whaling company and Indian made five voyages for them. Her first voyage lasted from 11 August 1817 to 9 July 1819. She had two masters, Sullivan, and then William Swain, and she brought home 800 casks of whale oil. One of the crew was Samuel Swain, William's cousin, who would become her master for her fourth and fifth whaling voyages.

Indian, Bermuda-built and of 399 tons (bm), appeared in Lloyd's Register for 1818 under their ownership with S. Swain as master, and trade as London-South Seas. Swain was her master again in the 1819 Lloyd's Register.

However, she left on her second voyage on 18 September 1819 under Captain Silas West. The 1820 Lloyd's Register gives the master's name as C. West. Between 16 March and 21 April 1821 Indian was at Sydney refitting. On 29 May Indian, West, master, sailed for the fishery. On 22 July 1822 she left Bay of Islands with 1200 barrels of whale oil. By that time West had died and her masters became Meyrick or Starbuck. She arrived in Britain on 27 August 1822 with 400 casks of whale oil, plus whale jawbones and teeth.

Indian left on her third voyage on 20 January 1823 under the command of Gibson, master. In June—July 1824 she was off the coast of Japan, reportedly with 450 barrels. In September she was at Timor with 600 barrels. She returned to Britain on 9 November 1825 with 500 casks of whale oil and one cask of ambergris.

Lloyd's Register for 1825, gave her master's name as J. Gibson, and her burthen was given as 385 tons (bm). This figure of 385 tons is the one that the database of whaling voyages uses.

For Indian's fourth voyage, Samuel Swain became her master. He sailed her to the Southern Fisheries on 4 February 1826. She traveled via Indonesian waters and arrived in Sydney in July. The Australian in its "Ship News" column for 26 July reported that she was carrying 16 tons of sperm oil, but had had to put into port because her crew was mutinous. Indian left on 28 August and spent some eight months whaling. She returned to England by 3 March 1828 with 700 casks of whale oil gathered in Indonesian and New Zealand waters.

The third and fourth cruises averaged 28 months each. One source reports that she returned from the third cruise with a "full ship" with about 270 tuns of oil. However, this represented an average of 11 tuns a month. By contrast, the whaler Alfred, operating out of Australia, averaged 17 tuns per month. The problem for Indian was the amount of time required to sail between England and the whaling grounds. (Note: Even after one takes into account that much of the oil the colonial whalers gained still had to be shipped to England, the Australian whalers were more profitable.)

Indian left Britain on 23 May 1828 on her fifth voyage (and last for Enderby), bound for Timor and under Swain's command. She was at Timor in January 1829 with 100 barrels, and at the Bay of Islands on 5 September with 220 tuns of sperm oil. By November 1829 she was at Tongatapu with 1800 barrels. Indian returned to England on 3 January 1831 with 800 casks.

In 1830 Lloyd's Register gave her master as Swain, and her trade as Falmouth-South Seas. However, Swain left Indian after his return to England and then commanded Vigilant for Enderbys.

Indian, W. Grant, master, left Britain on 16 October 1831 on her sixth voyage. Grant may have been her owner as there is no information on any other owner. She was at Madeira on 8 November, at the Bay of Islands with 2000 barrels on 3 February 1833, and to have there with 2200 barrels in April 1834 for London. She arrived there on 27 June. Lloyd's Register had Indian with Grant, master, and trade London-South Seas. Lloyd's Register for 1834 listed Indian, 385 tons (bm), W. Grant, master. However, the entry had no mention of ownership and simply gave her location as London. The entry continued unchanged until Indian was no longer listed in Lloyd's Register after 1838.

However, Indian continued to make voyages under new owners. For her seventh voyage, she left Britain on 4 September 1835 bound for Timor, with J. Freeman, master, and T. Ward, owner. She was reported to have been at St Helena on 16 February 1839, having left Timor on 27 December 1838. She arrived in Britain on 3 March 1839 with 200 casks.

For Indian's eighth voyage, master and owner were Maugham. She left on 26 June 1839. From the Marquesas Islands she arrived in 20 days at Honolulu, where she stayed from 3 to 7 May 1840. She had 500 barrels 10 months after having left London. She was again at Honolulu between 17 October and 15 November. She now had 850 (or 880) barrels after having been out 16 months. She arrived back in Britain on 16 May 1843 with 370 casks.

Indian's ninth voyage, her last recorded voyage, began on 2 September 1843 with J. Maugham, master, and T. Ward, owner. She was bound for New Zealand and was reported at the Bay of Islands on 9 January 1846 with 75 tons oil, having been out 31 months. She arrived back in Britain on 14 June 1847. She brought back 12 tanks blubber, 130 casks of sperm oil, and 54 [seal] skins.
