= Melantho (1812 ship) =

History

United States
- Name: Melantho
- Builder: 1812
- Commissioned: early 1814
- Captured: 1812

United Kingdom
- Name: Melantho
- Owner: 1813:Munning; 1820:Matthew & James Whiting; 1823:Christopher Nockells
- Builder: Liverpool
- Acquired: 1812 by purchases of a prize
- Fate: Last listed 1826

General characteristics
- Tons burthen: 359, 361, or 402>(bm)
- Propulsion: Sail
- Armament: 2 × 6-pounder guns + 16 × 18-pounder carronades

Melantho was built in Philadelphia in 1812. The War of 1812 broke out as she was on her first voyage and the British captured her that September. She became a merchantman and then a whaler, making two whaling voyages to Timor before she was last listed in 1826.

== Capture ==
HMS Spartan was part of Sir John Borlase Warren's squadron when on 17 September 1812 she captured Melantho, as Melantho was returning from Chile and bound to Baltimore. Spartan sent Melantho into Halifax, Nova Scotia, where the Vice admiralty court condemned her in prize. Spartan shared the prize money with Statira, Acasta, Nymphe, Orpheus, Maidstone, Aeolus, and Emulous. (Note: A first-class share of the prize money, that of a captain, was worth £371 11s 3¼d; a sixth-class share, that of an ordinary seaman, was worth £3 16s 4¼.)

Melantho, William Davidson, master, had a cargo of 229 tons of copper, nine bales of furs, and $43,000 at the time of her capture. On his return to the United States Davidson gave an interview in which he criticized the British treatment of the crews of the vessels they had captured.

== Merchantman ==
Melantho entered Lloyd's Register in 1814 (published in 1813), with J.B. Gooch, master, Munnings, owner, and trade London–East Indies. The 1815 volume of the Register of Shipping showed her master changed from Gooch to J.Herd, and her trade changed from London–India to London–Cape of Good Hope.

Year	Master	Owner	Trade	Source
1820	Eckley; Evans	Silver & Co. Whiting	London–Île de France	Lloyd's Register
1821	Evans	Whiting	London–South Seas	Lloyd's Register

== Whaler ==
First whaling voyage (1820-1823): Captain Henry Gardner sailed from England on 11 June 1820, bound for Timor. Melantho returned to England on 31 March 1823 with 380 casks of whale oil, and fins (baleen).

Second whaling voyage (1823-1826): Captain Nathaniel Pease Folger sailed from England on 15 July 1823, bound for Timor and the Japans. In September 1825 Melantho visited Pitcairn Island after having whaled at Timor and off the coast of Japan. She returned to England on 24 March 1826 with 380 casks of whale oil. During the voyage Noah Folger replace Nathaniel as master, and H. Gordon replaced Noah.

== Fate ==
Melantho was last listed in Lloyd’s Register in 1826. She continued to be listed in the Register of Shipping into 1830, but in both cases the information was stale as it showed Folgar, master, and Nockles, owner.
