= HMS Plumper (1807) =

Brig of the Royal Navy

History

United Kingdom
- Name: HMS Plumper
- Ordered: 1 October 1804
- Builder: Halifax Dockyard, Nova Scotia (M/Shipwright William Hughes)
- Launched: 29 December 1807
- Honours and awards: Naval General Service Medal with clasp "Guadaloupe"
- Fate: Wrecked 5 December 1812

General characteristics
- Type: Archer-class gunbrig
- Tons burthen: 177 26/94 (bm)
- Length: 80 ft 0 in (24.4 m) (overall); 65 ft 10 in (20.1 m) (keel)
- Beam: 22 ft 6 in (6.9 m)
- Depth of hold: 9 ft 5 in (2.9 m)
- Sail plan: Brig
- Complement: 50
- Armament: 10 × 18-pounder carronades + 2 × 12-pounder chase guns

HMS Plumper was launched in 1807. She captured three small American privateers early in the War of 1812 but was wrecked in December 1812.

== Career ==
Lieutenant William Frissell commissioned Plumper in 1808 and commanded her until 1810. He was in command when Plumper participated in the capture of Guadeloupe in January and February 1810. (Note: A first-class share of the prize money for Guadaloupe was worth £113 3s 1¼d; a sixth-class share, that of an ordinary seaman, was worth £1 9s 1¼d.) In 1847 the Admiralty awarded the Naval General Service Medal with clasp "Guadaloupe" to all surviving participants of the campaign.

On 22 January 1811 Lloyd's List (LL) reported incorrectly that Plumper had been lost in the St Lawrence River while sailing from Halifax to Quebec.

From 1812 her commander was Lieutenant James Bray. HMS Indian and Plumper captured the privateer schooner Fair Trader on 16 July 1812 in the Bay of Fundy. Fair Trader was armed with one gun and had a 20-man crew. (Note: Fair Trader, of Salem, was under the command of Captain J. Morgan, and normally had a crew of 25 men, some of whom may have been away in a prize at the time of her capture. During her brief career as a privateer she captured one sloop, one brig, and five schooners.) Also around the middle of July an American privateer captured William, of Bristol, Hare, master, off Cape Sable. Indian recaptured William and took her into Halifax. Whether William was one of Fair Trader's prizes or not is an open question. A report in LL stated that Indian had captured Fair Trader, Argus, and a third American privateer.

LL reported that Indian and Plumper had captured six American privateers. Separately, it reported that Plumper had recaptured Fanny, from Glasgow, which the American privateer Teazer had captured. Fanny, Colston, master, had been sailing from Clyde to New Brunswick. Plumper sent her into Halifax. On 6 July Plumper captured Samuel, Stanton, master, which had been sailing from Oporto. Plumper took out $5300 and permitted Samuel to proceed. Samuel arrived at Boston on 11 July. On 17 July Plumper captured the American privateer schooner Argus. Argus was armed with one gun and had a crew of 23 men. (Note: Argus, of Boston, Captain W. Heath, had captured two brigs and two schooners before Plumper had captured her. The estimated value of her captures was $180,000.) The next day Plumper captured the American privateer Friendship, of one gun and eight men. (Note: Friendship, of Massachusetts, Captain A. Rich, apparently had not captured anything before Plumper captured her.) LL reported on 15 September 1812 that Plumper had detained the sloop Margaret, from Liverpool, but that an American privateer had retaken Margaret and taken her into Portland.

== Wreck ==
Plumper was wrecked on 5 December 1812 while en route to Halifax with £70,000 in specie for the purchase of arms for the military in St John. She struck on the ledges south of Dipper Harbour in the Bay of Fundy and sank immediately with the loss of the specie and 42-45 of the 60 people on board, consisting both of crew and passengers. Bray and all his officers were among the men drowned. (Note: Other reports have Bray surviving and going on to a long, mediocre career. However, this is the result of a conflation between James Bray and Josias Bray. James Bray's will was proved in 1813, and his widow claimed charity from an organization that helped widows of naval officers. Josias Bray commanded the hired armed cutters Active in 1812-13 and Badger in 1813-14.)

HMS Bream and the sloop Brunswicker attended the wreck the following day to assist in recover and pick up survivors, but no mention was made of whether they recovered the $30,000 in gold and silver leading to centuries of rumors of lost treasure at the wreck site. Lloyd's of London reported the loss on 8 January 1813.

In 1972, a shipwreck believed to be Plumper was named a provincial protected site.
