= USS Nautilus (1799) =

Captured schooner of the US Navy

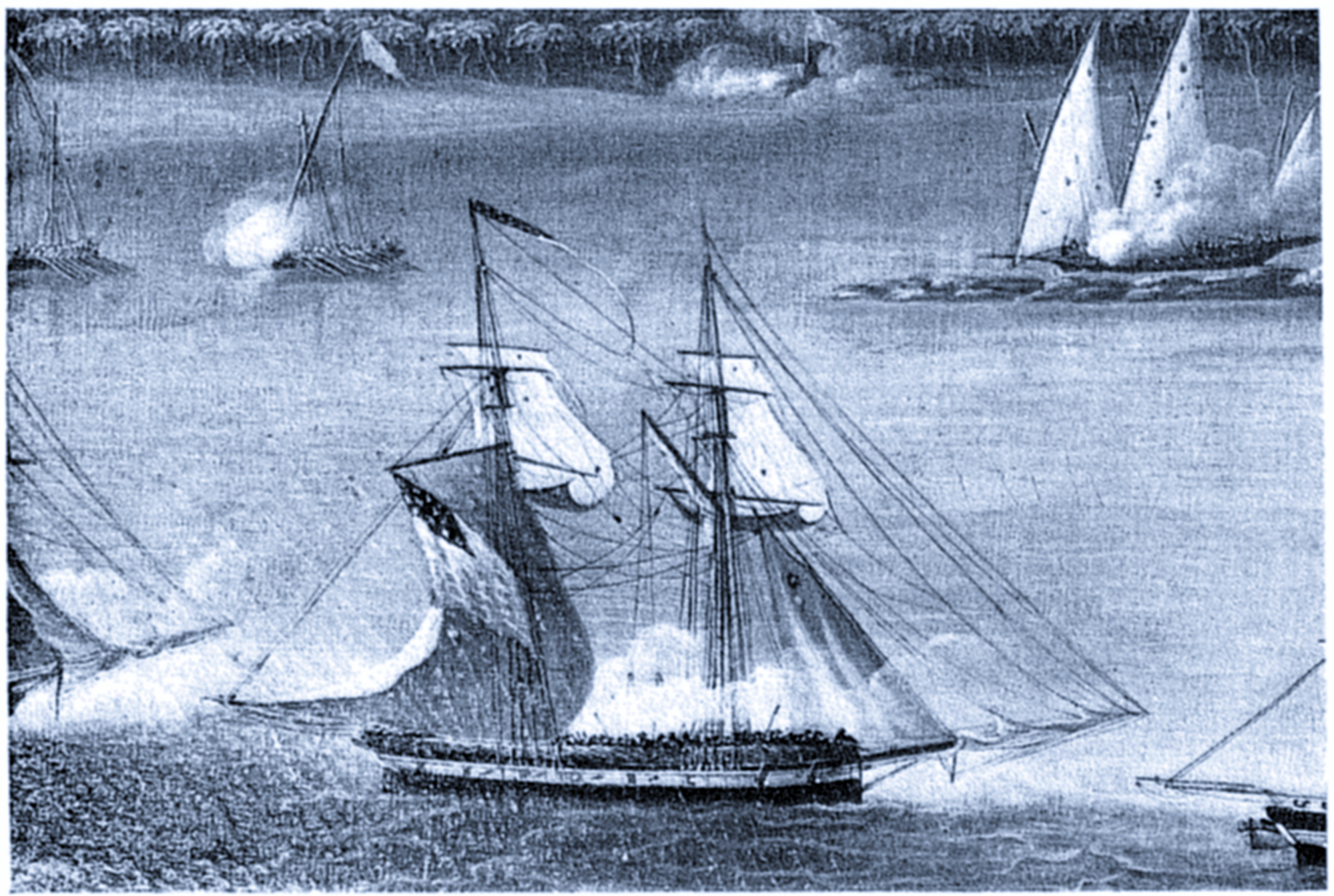
- USS Nautilus

History

United States
- Name: USS Nautilus
- Builder: Spencer
- Cost: $18,763 ($451,000 in 2024)
- Laid down: 1799
- Acquired: Purchased, May 1803 $7,500
- Commissioned: 24 June 1803
- Fate: Captured by Royal Navy, 6 July 1812

United Kingdom
- Name: HMS Emulous
- Acquired: By capture 6 July 1812
- Fate: Sold or broken up 1817

General characteristics
- Type: Schooner Rerigged as Brig 1810
- Displacement: 185 long tons (188 t)
- Tons burthen: 213 (bm)
- Length: 87 ft 6 in (26.67 m) (overall) 71 ft 6 in (21.79 m) (keel)
- Beam: 23 ft 8 in (7.21 m) or 26"
- Depth of hold: 9 ft 10 in (3.00 m)
- Propulsion: Sail
- Complement: 103 officers and enlisted
- Armament: Initially: 12 × 6-pounder long guns; From 1811: 12 × 18-pounder carronades + 2 long guns; British service: 12 × 12-pounder carronades + 2 × 6-pounder guns

Nautilus was a schooner launched in 1799. The United States Navy purchased her in May 1803 and commissioned her USS Nautilus; she thus became the first ship to bear that name. She served in the First Barbary War. She was altered to a brig. The British captured Nautilus early in the War of 1812 and renamed her HMS Emulous. After her service with the Royal Navy, the Admiralty sold her in 1817.

== Origins ==
Henry Spencer built Nautilus on 1799 as a merchant vessel on the Eastern Shore of Maryland. The Navy purchased her at Baltimore, Maryland, from Thomas Tennant. She was commissioned on 24 June 1803, under Lieutenant Richard Somers.

== First Barbary War ==
Nautilus sailed to Hampton Roads, whence she got underway on 30 June for the Mediterranean, carrying dispatches for the U.S. Mediterranean Squadron stationed there assigned to protect the interests of the United States and its citizens residing or trading in that area, and threatened at that time by the Barbary States.

Nautilus arrived at Gibraltar on 27 July and departed again on the 31st to deliver dispatches to Captain John Rodgers in John Adams, then returned to Gibraltar to await the arrival of Commodore Edward Preble, in Constitution, and join his squadron. Constitution arrived at Gibraltar on 12 September, and after provisioning, the squadron, less Philadelphia, sailed 6 October with vessels of Capt. Rodgers's squadron to Tangier. This display of naval strength induced the Emperor of Morocco to renew the treaty of 1786.

On 31 October 1803, the Tripolitans captured Philadelphia and the squadron's interests came to focus on Tripoli and Tunis. Using Syracuse as their rendezvous point, the vessels appeared off Tunis and Tripoli at different times between November 1803 and May 1804. In February 1804, while Lieutenant Stephen Decatur daringly sailed Intrepid into Tripoli harbor and burned the captured Philadelphia, Nautilus cruised off Tunis. On 16 February she captured Maltese brigantine Mominato Crucifisso (or St. Crucifiso) 4-5 leagues off Tripoli. The vessel has a pass allowing her to travel to Tripoli in ballast to receive bullocks, and only bullocks, purchased for use of the British garrison at Malta. When stopped inbound she had cargo on board in violation of the pass. Court later ordered her to be released.

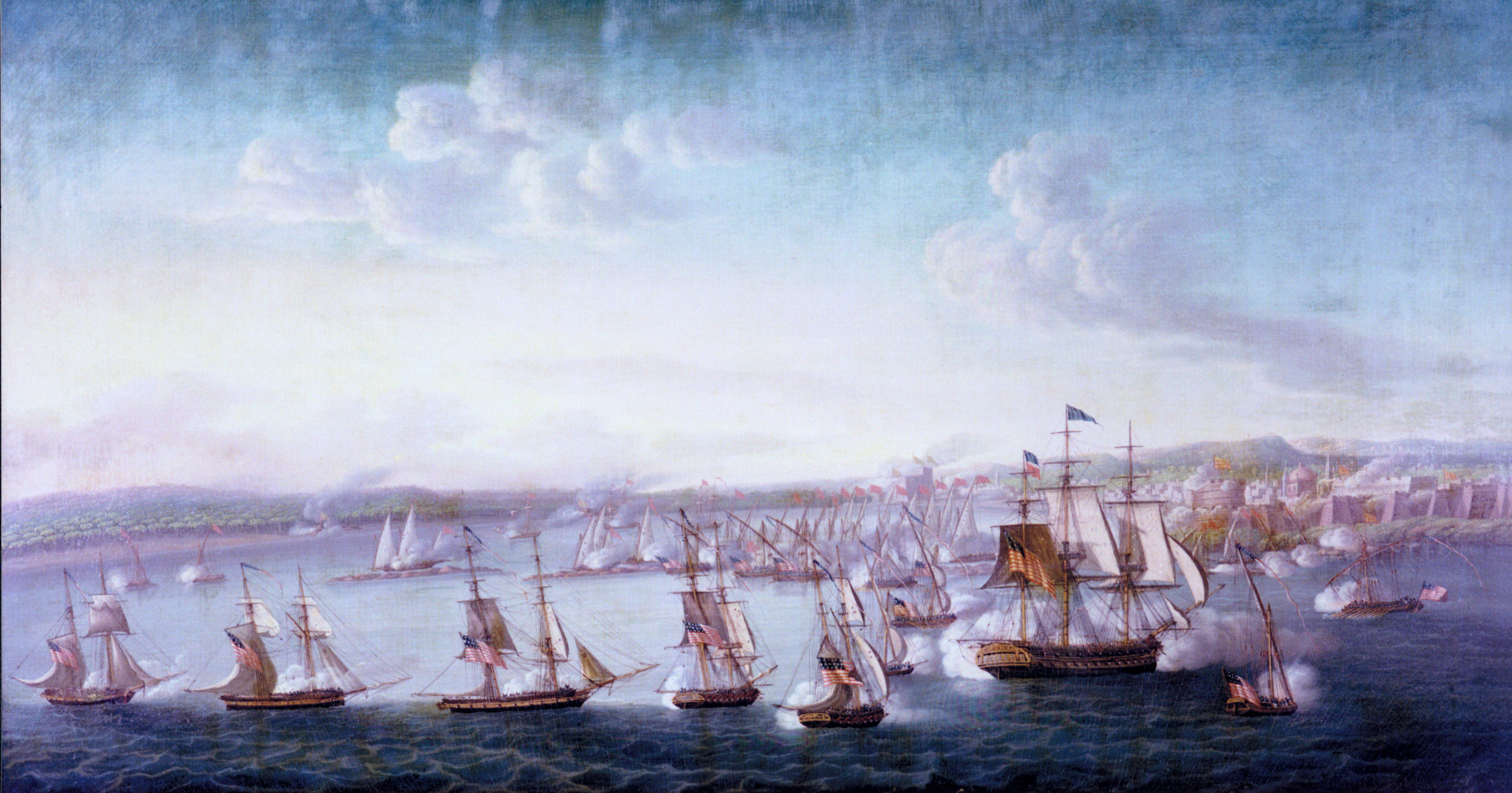
USS Nautilus (second from left) participating in the bombardment of Tripoli, 3 August 1804, painting by Michele Felice Cornè, 1752-1845

Toward the end of the month Nautilus retired to Syracuse, returning to Tripoli in mid-March. On 20 March she collided with USS Syren, causing damage to Nautilus that she had to return to port. Sometime after being repaired and before 16 April 1804 she shipped water in a gale off Tripoli causing serious damage And necessitating throwing 4 guns overboard to save the ship. During May and June she repaired at Messina. June 30, 1804 she is reported to be almost wholly rebuilt at a cost upwards of $3,000. On May 28 Lt. Sommers was ordered to take command of six gunboats borrowed from the King of Naples & most of her crew manned the gunboats. She was left in charge of Lt. Reid and a small crew and Marines. Departing 5 July, she joined Constitution off Tripoli on 25 July. During August and early September, she took part in the siege of Tripoli and saw action in five general attacks between 3 August and 3 September. After Somer's death commanding the fireship USS Intrepid Lt. John H. Dent was order to take command in a letter dated 4 September. On 16 September 1804 Master Commander Dent took command. For the next five months, she continued to cruise off Tripoli and Tunis, retiring periodically to Syracuse and Malta, whence in February 1805, she sailed to Livorno to acquire a new mainmast.

On 27 April 1805, she arrived off Derna to participate in the attack, capture, and occupation of that town. She remained until 17 May, during which time she provided cover for the forces of Hamet Caramanli, former Bashaw of Tripoli, as they went into action against the army of Hamet's brother Yusuf ibn Ali Karamanli, who had overthrown Hamet and assumed his title. Departing on the 17th, Nautilus retired to Malta with dispatches and casualties. At the end of the month, she returned to Tripoli and on 10 June hostilities ceased with the signing of a peace treaty. On 30 July she was with the U.S. fleet at Tunis.

Nautilus remained in the Mediterranean for a year after the treaty went into effect, conducting operations from Malta and Gibraltar. In the spring of 1806 she was assigned to Algiers for dispatch duty, sailing in June for the United States.

== Between wars ==
Arriving at Washington, D.C., in mid-July, Nautilus entered the Washington Navy Yard there and was placed in ordinary. Reactivated in 1808, she was employed on the East Coast until entering the Navy Yard again in 1810. The Navy then altered her to a brig, giving her a battery of twelve 18-pounder (8 kg) carronades. The Navy recommissioned Nautilus in 1811 and she joined Stephen Decatur's squadron.

== Capture ==
After the War of 1812 with Britain broke out on 18 June 1812, Nautilus gained the dubious distinction of being the first American warship to be lost. A squadron built around the Third Rate Africa (64 guns) and the two Fifth Rate frigates, Shannon (38 guns) and Aeolus (32 guns), captured her off northern New Jersey. Nautilus was 24 hours out on a cruise from New York when Shannon and Aeolus captured her on 17 July. At the time of her capture she mounted 16 guns, had crew of 106 men and was under the command of Lieutenant William M. Crane. (Note: A first-class share of the prize money, that of a captain, was £68 15s 11d; a sixth-class share, that of an ordinary seaman, was worth 12 s 0¾d.)

== HMS Emulous ==
The British immediately but informally took Nautilus into service under the name Emulous, having just lost the Cruizer-class brig-sloop Emulous on 2 August. On 29 August the Admiralty formally purchased Nautilus/Emulous for £3,252 17s 2d. On 2 February 1813 Emulous was commissioned under Commander William Mackenzie Godfrey, on the Halifax station.

Emulous proceeded to capture a number of American privateers or merchant vessels listed below:

- On 25 August 1812, Emulous captured the American ship Gossamer. (Note: Three years later a payment of prize money for Gossamer amounted to £26 1s 5½d for Emulous's captain and 11s 10d for an ordinary seaman.) That same day, Emulous captured the American privateer schooner Science, under the command of Captain W. Fernald. Science, of 74 tons, five guns, and 52 men was on a cruise out of Portsmouth. (Note: A first-class share of the prize money was worth £26 1s 5½d; a sixth-class share was worth 11s 10d.)
- On 17 September 1812, Emulous was among the vessels sharing in Spartan's capture of the Melantho on 17 September. Melantho of 402 tons, William Davidson, master, had been sailing from Chile to Boston with a cargo of 229 tons of copper, nine bales of furs, and $48,000. (Note: A first-class share of the prize money was worth £371 11s 3¼d; a sixth-class share was worth £3 16s 4¼d.)
- On 21 September 1812, Maidstone and Orpheus captured the brig Ambition, sailing from Baltimore to Boston on 21 September 1812. Emulous and Spartan shared in the prize money. Ambition, Benjamin Shaw, of 139 tons (bm), master, had been carrying 804 barrels of flour. (Note: A captain's share of the prize money was £121 12s 1¾d; an ordinary seaman's share was £1 8s 0½d.)
- On 5 April 1813, she captured the American schooner privateer Cossack. (Note: A captain's share of the prize money was £58 3s 9½d; an ordinary seaman's share was £1 6s 2½d.) Cossack, of Salem, 48 tons (bm), was pierced for 10 guns but carried only one long 18-pounder and had a crew of 40 men. Cossack arrived at Saint John, New Brunswick on 8 April. Cossac, a schooner, had been under the command of Jonathon Upton.

On 18 April Emulous captured the American ship Bird. Bird, J.Hammond, master, was a schooner of 80 tons (bm), and carrying a cargo of 3,700 "hhd" of staves and 20,000 shingles. She had been sailing from Frenchman's Bay to the Spanish Main when Emulous captured her; Emulous took her into New Brunswick.

- On 5 May, Emulous, Shannon, Nymphe, and Tenedos captured the schooner Ann, of 142 tons, sailing from New Orleans to Bordeaux. Ann, J.B.Allison, master, was carrying a cargo of cotton, lead, and skins. That same day Nymphe, together with the same three other British ships, captured the American privateer Montgomery, of 12 guns and a crew of 75 (or 90) men. She was on her way home after a two-month cruise off the coast of Ireland. Montgomery, of Salem, was under the command of J.Strout. (Note: A captain's share of the prize money was £19 6s 11¾d; an ordinary seaman's share was 2s 9¼d.)
- On 4 August 1813, Emulous recaptured the schooner Four Brothers, of 330 tons (bm), R. Sinclair, master.
- On 21 or 24 September 1813, the Canadian privateer Dart drove the American privateer Orange, a chebacco boat of two guns and 11 men, on to Fox Island in Machias Bay on the coast of Maine. (Note: A chebacco was a narrow-sterned boat formerly used in the Newfoundland fisheries; also known as a pinkstern or chebec.) There the boats of Emulous and Bream, under the command of Lieutenant Wright of Emulous, destroyed her.
- On 10 October 1813, Emulous destroyed two small American privateers in Passamaquaddy Bay, between Maine and New Brunswick. One was the schooner Orion, of one gun and 16 men; the other was the row boat Camelion, with 17 men and small arms.

== Post-war and fate ==
On 22 July 1814, Godfrey removed to Arachne. Commander John Gore then took command on 23 July 1814 and remained until 3 February 1815. On 13 June 1815 Lieutenant John Undrell was promoted to the rank of Commander. He took command of Emulous, still on the Jamaica station. His replacement was the newly promoted Commander Thomas Wrenn Carter, who removed to HMS Carnation in April 1816. (Note: Carter had been promoted to Commander in July 1815.) Her last commander was Lieutenant Caleb Jackson (acting). He sailed Emulous to Deptford and paid her off there on 19 June 1816; (Note: Jackson did not receive promotion to Commander until 12 August 1819.) she was then laid up there. The Admiralty sold her for £900 in August 1817.

Emulous may have become the mercantile Nautilus, a snow of 230 tons (bm), and built in America. Nautilus, D.Coff, master, Tofl, owner, and trade Cowes-St Thomas.

== See also ==
- List of ships captured in the 19th century
