= Hornby (surname) =

Hornby is a surname. Notable people with the surname include:

- A. N. Hornby (1847–1925), English rugby and cricket player
- A. S. Hornby (1898–1978), English grammarian, lexicographer, and pioneer in the field of English language learning and teaching (ELT)
- Andy Hornby (born 1967), English businessman
- Anna Hornby (1914–1996), English painter and calligrapher
- Ben Hornby (born 1980), Australian rugby league player
- Clare Hornby (born 1973), English businesswoman
- Clive Hornby (1944–2008), English actor
- D. Brock Hornby (born 1944), American judge
- Derek Hornby (1930–2013), British businessman
- Edmund Hornby (politician) (1773–1857), British politician
- Edmund Grimani Hornby (1825–1896), British judge
- Edmund Phipps-Hornby (1857–1947), English recipient of the Victoria Cross
- Edward Kenworthy Hornby (1839–1887), British politician
- Frank Hornby (1863–1936), English inventor of Meccano and Hornby Trains
- Geoffrey Thomas Phipps Hornby (1825–1895), British admiral of the fleet
- Hugh Leycester Hornby (1888–1965), Anglican clergyman
- James John Hornby (1826–1909), headmaster and, later, provost of Eton
- John Hornby (1880–1927), Canadian explorer
- Judy Hornby, British-American fashion designer
- Lesley Hornby (born 1949), birth name of English model, actress, and singer better known as "Twiggy"
- Nick Hornby (born 1957), author
- Nick Hornby (artist) (born 1980), British artist
- Phipps Hornby (1785–1867), British naval officer
- Phipps Hornby (cricketer) (1820–1848), English cricketer
- Richard Hornby (1922–2007), British politician and businessman
- Robert William Bilton Hornby (1821–1888), priest, antiquarian and lord of the manor from the City of York
- Ron Hornby (1914–1962), British football player
- Ross Hornby, Canadian diplomat
- Simon Hornby (1934–2010), English businessman
- Warwick Hornby, Australian musician in the band The Whitlams
- Wilfrid Bird Hornby (1851–1935), Anglican bishop
- William Hornby (governor) (c.1723–1803), Governor of Bombay
- Sir William Hornby, 1st Baronet (1841–1928), English industrialist and politician, son of William Henry
- William Henry Hornby (1805–1884), English industrialist and politician

== See also ==
- Hornsby (surname)
- Hornby baronets
