= USRC Commodore Barry =

Ship of the U.S. Revenue Cutter Service

History

United States
- Name: USRC Commodore Barry
- Namesake: Commodore John Barry
- Operator: US Revenue Marine
- Acquired: 20 March 1812 by purchase
- Captured: 3 August 1812

New Brunswick
- Name: Brunswicker
- Operator: Province of New Brunswick
- Acquired: c. November 1812
- Fate: Sold 1815

General characteristics
- Tons burthen: 98 (bm)
- Armament: 6 guns, though pierced for 10.

USRC Commodore Barry was a vessel that the US Revenue Cutter Service bought in 1812, before the outbreak of the War of 1812. The British captured her in August of the same year. She served briefly in November as a privateer out of Saint John, New Brunswick under the name Brunswicker before being laid up that same month. She was sold in 1815.

== Commodore Barry ==
The US government bought this schooner on 20 March 1812 for US $4100 from Stephen Mitchell of Sag Harbor, New York. On 31 April Daniel Elliot of East Machias, Maine, received a commission as a revenue cutter master, and brought the vessel back to eastern Maine. The schooner was stationed at Eastport, on Passamaquoddy Bay under the control of the local customs collector, Lemuel Trescott, and engaged in anti-smuggling operations.

== Capture ==
Maidstone and Spartan captured Commodore Barry on 3 August in the Little River, Bay of Fundy, together with three privateer schooners, Madison, Olive, and Spence (or Spruce). Each of the schooners was armed with two guns. Before the British captured the vessels many men from their crews escaped to batteries they had erected on shore and armed with guns from their vessels. The Americans resisted, inflicting some casualties, and then fled. Still, the British captured some men on Commodore Barry who remained prisoners of war until paroled in June 1813. The crew of Spartan received prize money for Commodore Barry in July 1820. (Note: A first-class share, that of a captain, was worth £59 11s 11¼d; a sixth-class share, that of an ordinary seaman, was worth 11s 6¼d.)

== Brunswicker ==
In November, the provincial authorities in Saint John, New Brunswick bought the Commodore Barry for protection against American privateers. By this point the vessel was re-rigged as a sloop, but it is unclear when this happened. On 19 November she sailed on a cruise with the 4-gun schooner HMS Bream. Together, they chased four American privateers from Passamaquoddy Bay. For this cruise Brunswicker's crew consisted of 20 volunteers from Saint John. The province laid the sloop up on 24 November, but sailed her again in the spring of 1813. Apparently the vessel had been very expensive to operate and with the Royal Navy asserting its dominance in the region by 1813, her services were no longer required.

== Fate ==
The authorities in Saint John auctioned off Brunswicker on 4 July 1815, for £730. She had been in custody for 770 days.
