= Dart (privateer) =

History

United States
- Name: Actress
- Captured: 18 July 1812

United Kingdom
- Name: Dart
- Owner: Saint John, New Brunswick
- Acquired: 1812 by purchase of a prize
- Captured: 22 October 1813

General characteristics
- Class & type: Sloop
- Tons burthen: 47 (bm)
- Length: 60 ft (18.3 m)
- Beam: 18 ft (5.5 m)
- Complement: 25
- Armament: 4 carronades plus swivel guns. (Addition of a 12 pound carronade after her first voyage).

Dart was a privateer sloop out of Saint John, New Brunswick during the War of 1812. Dart took 11 prizes in her five-month run and two cruises before an American ship captured her in October 1813. Dart is unique because a logbook of one of her voyages (22 May 1813 to 9 June 1813) survives at the Dalhousie University Archives along with full crew lists and the articles of agreement at the Public Archives of Nova Scotia, which make Dart one of the best-documented privateer vessels of the War of 1812.

== History ==
On 18 July 1812, HMS Spartan captured the American vessel Actress and took her to port in Saint John, New Brunswick as a prize, where she remained until being auctioned off to new owners. Her new owners renamed her Dart and fitted her out as a privateer. On 4 May 1813 she received her first letter of marque, and began stocking provisions for her first cruise under Captain John Harris. Dart met with success, bringing in three prizes by 10 June 1813.

Dart received her second letter of marque on 14 July 1813 and undertook her second cruise this time under Captain James Ross. Again she met with success, taking eight more prizes. Dart continued raiding the seas off the coast of Maine and Massachusetts until 22 October 1813, when the U.S. revenue cutter Vigilant captured her and returned her to American ownership.
