= HMS Bream (1807) =

History

United Kingdom
- Name: HMS Bream
- Ordered: 11 December 1805
- Builder: Goodrich & Co. (prime contractor), Bermuda
- Laid down: 1806
- Launched: May 1807
- Fate: Sold or broken up 1816

General characteristics
- Type: Ballahoo-class schooner
- Tons burthen: 70 41/94 (bm)
- Length: 55 ft 2 in (16.8 m) (overall); 40 ft 10 1/2 in (12.5 m) (keel)
- Beam: 18 ft 0 in (5.5 m)
- Depth of hold: 9 ft 0 in (2.7 m)
- Sail plan: Schooner
- Complement: 20
- Armament: 4 × 12-pounder carronades

HMS Bream was a British Royal Navy Ballahoo-class schooner of four 12-pounder carronades and a crew of 20. The prime contractor for the vessel was Goodrich & Co., in Bermuda, and she was launched in 1807. Bream operated primarily in North American waters and had an uneventful career until the War of 1812. She then captured two small American privateers and assisted in the recovery of a third, much larger one. She also captured a number of small prizes before she was sold or broken up in 1816.

== Napoleonic Wars ==
She was commissioned in March 1807 under Lieutenant Augustus Vere Drury at Halifax, Nova Scotia. In April Sub-Lieutenant George Gover Miall, the commander of the schooner Chebuctoo, was ordered to act as Lieutenant-Commander of the Bream. (Note: Chebuctoo was probably a colonial government vessel.) Miall sailed Bream to the Leeward Islands. (Note: Drury was appointed to the cutter Sylvia on 3 July. Miall was confirmed as a Lieutenant on 11 April 1808.) While Bream was in the Chesapeake Bay a mutiny broke out that Lieutenant Bartholomew George Smith Day helped suppress. Miall removed to Duguay Trouin on 15 June 1809. (Note: Duguay Trouin may have been the schooner that Ferret and Hussar captured on 30 March 1809. This letter of marque was commissioned in April to carry eight guns. She then served in Sir John Borlase Warren's squadron.)

On 15 July 1809, Lieutenant Henry Dilkes Byng took command, serving in Bream until October when Sir John Borlase Warren appointed him to command Goree, then in Halifax. He was confirmed in the command on 12 December. His replacement, in January 1810, was Lieutenant Robert Heriot Barclay. On 17 August 1810 her commander became (acting) Lieutenant John Simpson. (Note: He was confirmed 14 December 1811.) Before Simpson could take command, Lieutenant Pollard assumed command for a short while. While he was captain of Bream, Pollard left Halifax in August, arriving in Bermuda on 10 September. Bream brought with her the mails for Bermuda that the packet ship Diana had brought from Falmouth.

While in Bream, Simpson carried specie to St. John's, Newfoundland and was frozen up at Louisburg, Cape Breton, which materially harmed his health. On 14 November 1811 Simpson was promoted to Lieutenant.

== War of 1812 ==
Bream's first duty in the war was the return of the two remaining seamen taken from USS Chesapeake in 1807. The British government did this as a conciliatory measure, but Bream, under Simpson's command, returned the men to the US Navy at Boston on 11 July 1812, nearly a month after war had already broken out between the two nations.

On 24 July, Colibri sighted three vessels off Cape Sable and gave chase to one, a schooner. When Colibri got close she exchanged signals with the schooner, which turned to be Bream. Colibri then chased and took two other vessels, which turned out to be an American privateer and a bark, her prize. The privateer was the Catherine; eight days out of Boston; she had taken only the bark. Catherine, under the command of Francis A. Burnham, was pierced for 16 guns but mounted 14 long six-pounder guns and had a crew of 88 men. She had suffered one man killed and one wounded before she surrendered. Her casualties were low as the crew had taken refuge below decks.

On 9 August Bream captured the American 3-gun privateer sloop Pythagoras and her crew of 35, under the command of Cyrus Libby. The capture took place off Shelburne and took 20 minutes, during which the American suffered two men wounded. The Vice admiralty court in Halifax, Nova Scotia, condemned Pythagoras, of 42 tons (bm), Cyrus Libby, master, sailing from Saco, Maine.

In October Admiral Sir John Borlase Warren dispatched Shannon and Bream to rescue the crew and offload the money aboard the frigate Barbadoes, which had been wrecked on Sable Island. They arrived on 10 October and retrieved both crew (only one of whom had drowned), and the specie. Whilst carrying this out, Shannon encountered and subsequently captured an enemy privateer that she took back to Halifax with her. In October 1812 Simpson volunteered, with his whole crew, and joined Statira, under Captain Hassard Stackpoole, to cruise with her. However, Simpson returned to Britain as an invalid in 1813.

Lieutenant Constantine Brown replaced Simpson at Halifax. From late 1812 to 1813 Bream served in the Bay of Fundy as part of a small squadron under the command of Captain Alexander Gordon in Rattler. In November 1812, Bream and the privateer Brunswicker of Saint John, New Brunswick, chased four American privateers from Passamaquoddy Bay. (Note: Brunswicker was the former American revenue cutter Commodore Barry, which Maidstone and Spartan had captured on 3 August. The province bought her for protection against American privateers. For this cruise her crew consisted of 20 volunteers from Saint John. The province laid her up on 24 November.) Brunswicker's replacement was the sloop Hunter. She and Bream cruised down the Bay of Fundy on 16 December.

Brown's replacement was Lieutenant Charles Hare. Under Hare's command Bream engaged in a successful campaign of guerre de course against American shipping on the Maine coast. Typical of the prizes made was the capture made on 23 April, when Bream captured the 85-ton (burthen) sloop Semiramis on her way to Boston from Portsmouth river. Most of these captures were made off the Kennebec River in the general vicinity of Monhegan Island, but occasional forays further south were made. On 19 May, Rattler, with Bream's assistance, captured the American 18-gun privateer Alexander off Kenebank (Kennebunk, Maine). Rattler drove Alexander, which was returning to Salem after a 10-week cruise, on shore. She had had a crew of 127 under her master, B. Crowninshield, but only 70 were still aboard when Rattler captured her. The rest of the crew escaped though several drowned as they swam from her. Bream helped Rattler get Alexander off. Her prize crew took Alexander into New Brunswick.

A week later, Bream captured the sloop Branch, of 78 tons, from Boston, bound to Dear Island. (sic; Deer Isle, on the eastern side of Penobscot Bay). Most captures were unarmed cargo vessels, but on 9 June, Bream and Hare captured the American privateer Wasp. The 40-ton Wasp had two 6-pounder guns and a crew of 33. Capturing her required an eight-hour running fight, including a fifty-minute battle at close quarters off Brier Island in the Bay of Fundy. Wasp had been out 18 days but had captured nothing. Despite the exchange of fire, the only casualty was one wounded American. Her captain placed the following advertisement in the Saint John, New Brunswick, Courier of 27 June:

A CARD - Lieut. Hare, Commander of H.M. Schooner Bream, is respectfully requested to accept the sincere thanks of Captain Ernest A. Ervin, commander of the American privateer Wasp, of Salem, for the very courteous, friendly and gentlemanlike treatment received while a prisoner on board, the deportment observed toward him being more like a friend and countryman than that of a declared enemy. - St. John, June 13, 1813.

The head money for Wasp was finally paid in November 1831.

On 12 July Bream took the schooner Jefferson, of 99 tons, out of Boston. Two days later Bream captured the Triton, of 122 tons, bound for Kennebeck from St. Thomas's. On the same day she captured the Betsey, of 117 tons, from Tortola and bound for Portland.

On 21 or 24 September, the Canadian privateer Dart drove the American privateer Orange, a chebacco boat of two guns and 11 men, on to Fox Island in Machias Bay on the coast of Maine. (Note: A chebacco was a narrow-sterned boat formerly used in the New England and Canadian maritime fisheries; also known as a pinkstern or chebec.) There the boats of Emulous and Bream destroyed her.

Hare's replacement was again Lieutenant Constantine Brown, who remained in command until 4 February 1814 when Lieutenant Thomas Beer took command in the Bay of Fundy, and served with her until he was placed on half-pay in September.

On 27 May, Bream captured the Pilgrim.

Beer commanded Bream at the capture of Moose Island (Maine) in July, and was present at the attack on Baltimore on 13 September.

Bream also shared in the prize money for the ship Abeona and the schooners Franklin and Saucy Jack, which other ships had captured between 21 October and 6 November. Similarly Bream shared in the prize money for the schooner Mary and the goods from the transports Lloyd and Abeona, captured in the Chesapeake between 29 November and 19 December. (Note: A first-class share of the prize money was worth £26 15s 10½d; a sixth-class share, that of an ordinary seaman, was worth 6s 1½d.)

Bream was paid off in May 1815.

== Fate ==
Bream was sold or broken up in 1816 in Bermuda.
