= HMS Minorca (1805) =

Brig-sloop of the Royal Navy

- Minorca

History

United Kingdom
- Name: HMS Minorca
- Namesake: Menorca
- Ordered: 24 October and 7 November 1803
- Builder: Josiah & Thomas Brindley, King's Lynn
- Laid down: May 1804
- Launched: 14 June 1805
- Fate: Sold c.1814

General characteristics
- Type: Cruizer-class brig-sloop
- Tons burthen: 385 (bm)
- Length: 100 ft 2 in (30.5 m) (gundeck); 77 ft 4 1/2 in (23.6 m) (keel)
- Beam: 30 ft 8 in (9.3 m)
- Depth of hold: 12 ft 9 in (3.9 m)
- Sail plan: Brig rigged
- Complement: 121
- Armament: 16 × 32-pounder carronades; 2 × 6-pounder bow guns

HMS Minorca was a Cruizer-class brig-sloop of the Royal Navy, launched in 1805. She served during the Napoleonic Wars in the Mediterranean and was broken up after an uneventful career.

== Career ==
Commander Henry Duncan commissioned Minorca in August 1805 and then sailed her for the Mediterranean. Duncan received promotion to post captain on 16 January 1806, but was not actually replaced until 19 April. Commander Granville George Waldegrave replaced Duncan.

On 23 December Minorca captured a Spanish merchant vessel. As Minorca was entering the Straits of Gibraltar on her way to join her station at Gibraltar, 11 privateers came out to reconnoitre her. Waldegrave immediately gave chase, causing them to disperse, though the largest one attempted to separate Minorca from her prize. After a two-hour chase, Waldegrave was able to capture the largest, the Nuestra Señora del Carmen (alias Caridad). She was armed with two 12-pounder guns, two 4-pounder guns, and two large swivel guns; she had a crew of 35 men. Minorca also captured a Spanish felucca, the packet boat on the Tangiers to Tarifa route, together with the mail that she was carrying.

Minorca then served off Cadiz in 1807, with Commander Phipps Hornby replacing Waldegrave in March. She sailed home at the end of the year.

On 12 April 1808, Minorca and her class-mate HMS Redwing captured the American ship Hope. Minorca sailed for the Mediterranean on 3 August 1808.

In 1810 Lieutenant Thomas Everard (acting) assumed command and was still in command on 12 May when Minorca captured the French polacca Friedland. Although Commander Ralph Randolph Wormley was appointed to command on 16 February, he clearly did not assume command until later.

On 4 June Minorca, with Wormley in command, captured the French privateer felucca Sans Peur. She was armed with one long gun and two swivel guns. She and her crew of 39 men had been out of Genoa for 35 days but had captured nothing.

In September Minorca was in company with Captain Charles Bullen and his frigate Volontaire as they reconnoitred the Spanish east coast towards the Medes Islands, which they had not yet visited.

On 4 June 1811 Minorca recaptured Manchester and sent her into Malta, where she arrived five days later. Manchester, of and for New York, had been coming from Sicily when a French privateer captured her on 1 June off Sardinia.

On 22 January 1812 Minorca recaptured Providence Increase, Berryman, master. She had been sailing from Malta when a French privateer captured her on 17 January. Providence Increase returned to Malta on 17 February.

On 2 January 1813, Minorca and Crocus captured San Nicolo. (Note: A first-class share of the prize money was worth £265 18s 8d; a sixth-class share, that of an ordinary seaman, was worth £7 10s 0d. Some costs were allocated equitably and were to be deducted at time of payment.)

Wormley received promotion to post captain on 7 June 1814.

== Fate ==
Minorca was broken up at Portsmouth in May 1814.
