= Hornsby (surname) =

Hornsby is a surname. Notable people with the surname include:

- Alton Hornsby Jr. (1940–2017) American historian, educator, and writer
- Aubrey Hornsby (1895–1981), American U.S. Army officer and aviation pioneer
- Brian Hornsby (born 1954), English footballer
- Bruce Hornsby (born 1954), American pianist and musician
- Dan Hornsby (1900–1951), American bluegrass musician
- David Hornsby (born 1975), American actor
- Ernest C. Hornsby (born 1936), Chief Justice of the Supreme Court of Alabama
- J. William Hornsby (1927–2007), mayor of Newport News, Virginia
- Jennifer Hornsby (born 1951), British philosopher
- John Hornsby (born 1956), American composer and musician; brother of Bruce
- Keith Hornsby (born 1991), American basketball player; son of Bruce
- Nick Hornsby (born 1995), American basketball player for Hapoel Be'er Sheva in the Israeli Basketball Premier League
- Nikki Hornsby, American singer-songwriter, musician
- Rogers Hornsby (1896–1963), American major league baseball player
- Thomas Hornsby (1733–1810), British astronomer and mathematician

Fictional:

- Lance Hornsby, a character in The Walking Dead.

== See also ==
- Hornby (surname)
