= Hornsby Brand Design =

Branding agency in Tennessee, United States

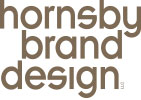
- Industry: Advertising agency Branding agency
- Founded: 2003; 22 years ago
- Founder: Bridget Hornsby
- Headquarters: Knoxville, Tennessee, United States
- Key people: Bridget Hornsby (CEO); Chris Hornsby (President)
- Website: hornsbybrandesign.com

Hornsby Brand Design LLC is a privately held branding design and advertising agency located in Knoxville, Tennessee. It sells its services to corporations, government agencies, and faith-based organizations, among many other institutions.

Hornsby Brand Design is a member of the American Advertising Federation (AAF) of Knoxville American Advertising Federation.

== History ==
The CEO and principal of Hornsby Brand Design LLC, Bridget Hornsby, studied at Grady College of Journalism and Mass Communication at the University of Georgia in Athens, Ga., graduating with an advertising degree in 1986. After working as a business manager for a wholesale printing company in Atlanta, Ga., she worked as a corporate editor of two magazines for the international, musical instruments manufacturer, Peavey Electronics Corporation in Meridian, Miss. In 1993 she founded HornsbyWerks and moved it to Knoxville, Tenn., in 1995. The company changed its name to Hornsby Brand Design in 2003, when its president, Chris Hornsby, joined the company. Hornsby Brand Design acquired the LLC in April 2014.

Chris studied graphic design at the University of Georgia, in Athens. Upon his graduation in 1984 with a BFA, he worked for the Joan Carol Design and Exhibit Group in Atlanta as a designer where he designed exhibits for some of the largest companies in the world. After a two-year stint, he moved to Richard Douglas Advertising, also in Atlanta. His first projects as an art director included the Dale Carnegie Institute and the Salvation Army.

== Awards ==
Hornsby Brand Design has been nationally and internationally recognized with more than 100 awards in print, web design and development and broadcast, along with being published in Print and How magazines' design annuals.

== Clients ==
A few of the regional, national and international organizations Hornsby Brand Design has served are the American Cancer Society, Regal Entertainment Group, Jewelry Television and the Brunswick Boat Group as well as numerous government agencies such as Knoxville Area Transit, Chattanooga Area Regional Transportation Authority, Anderson County Tourism Council, and the Memphis Urban Area MPO, among others. In addition, they have served faith-based organizations throughout the United States with faith-branding, and was featured five times in the GIA published book, "Graphic Design and Religion: A Call for Renewal", by Daniel Kantor, as well as on the front cover for its work for the faith-based community.
