= Hornby Castle =

Hornby Castle may refer to the following castles in England:

- Hornby Castle, Lancashire
- Hornby Castle, North Yorkshire
