= Phipps Hornby =

Royal Navy Admiral (1785–1867)

Admiral Sir Phipps Hornby GCB
- Born: 27 April 1785; Winwick, Lancashire
- Died: 19 March 1867 (aged 81); Petersfield, Hampshire
- Military career
- Allegiance: Great Britain; United Kingdom
- Branch: Royal Navy
- Service years: 1797–1867
- Rank: Admiral
- Commands: Pacific Station; HMS Spartan; HMS Stag; HMS Volage; HMS Minorca
- Conflicts: French Revolutionary Wars; Napoleonic Wars; Battle of Lissa
- Awards: Knight Grand Cross of the Order of the Bath
- Other work: Lord of the Admiralty

Admiral Sir Phipps Hornby, GCB (27 April 1785 – 19 March 1867) was a Royal Navy officer who served in the French Revolutionary and Napoleonic Wars. Hornby served on frigates throughout most of his wartime experience, which included witnessing the Nore Mutiny first hand aged 12 in 1797. Later, commanding his own sixth-rate HMS Volage in 1811, Hornby played a vital role in the British victory at the Battle of Lissa. At Lissa a British squadron under William Hoste overwhelmed a French force more than twice their own strength, Volage combating a much larger ship alone for several minutes and taking numerous casualties, including Hornby, who was wounded.

Later in life, Hornby accepted a succession of home and seagoing positions to ensure the promotion prospects for his son in the Navy as well as to support his close allies in Parliament under the Earl of Derby, to whom he was related. These positions included a period in command of the Pacific Fleet and later a role as one of the Lords of the Admiralty. During his career, Hornby accrued numerous awards and accolades, being made a Knight Grand Cross of the Order of the Bath and a full admiral before his death in 1867.

== Origins ==
Hornby was born in 1785, the 5th son of Rev. Geoffrey Hornby (1750–1812), of Scale Hall, near Lancaster in Lancashire, Rector of Winwick, High Sheriff of Lancashire in 1774 and a Deputy Lieutenant of Lancashire, Colonel of a regiment of Lancashire militia, by his wife Lucy Smith-Stanley (d.1833) a daughter of James Smith-Stanley, Lord Strange (1716–1771), (son and heir apparent of Edward Stanley, 11th Earl of Derby (1689–1776) of Knowsley Hall in Lancashire) and a sister of Edward Smith-Stanley, 12th Earl of Derby (1752–1834). Phipps Hornby's sister Charlotte Margaret Hornby (d.1817) married their first cousin Edward Smith-Stanley, 13th Earl of Derby (1775–1851), KG, and was the mother of Edward Smith-Stanley, 14th Earl of Derby (1799–1869), thrice Prime Minister of the United Kingdom (1852, 1858–9, 1866–8), thus Phipps Hornby's nephew. His eldest brother was Edmund Hornby (1773–1857) of Dalton Hall near Burton, Westmorland, a Member of Parliament for Preston, Lancashire, from 1812 to 1826, who married his first cousin Lady Charlotte Stanley (d.1805), a daughter of Edward Smith-Stanley, 12th Earl of Derby. The close association between the Earls of Derby and the Hornby family would play a significant role in Phipps Hornby's career and politics.

== Career ==
Hornby received education at Sunbury-on-Thames and joined the Navy as a midshipman in 1797 aged 12.

In 1797, Britain was embroiled in the French Revolutionary Wars, and Hornby's ship HMS Latona became caught up in the Nore Mutiny just weeks after he joined her. Latona's captain, John Bligh, took Hornby with him when he moved ships, and Hornby saw service on HMS Romney, HMS Agincourt and HMS Theseus, mainly serving in the Americas.

== Napoleonic Wars ==
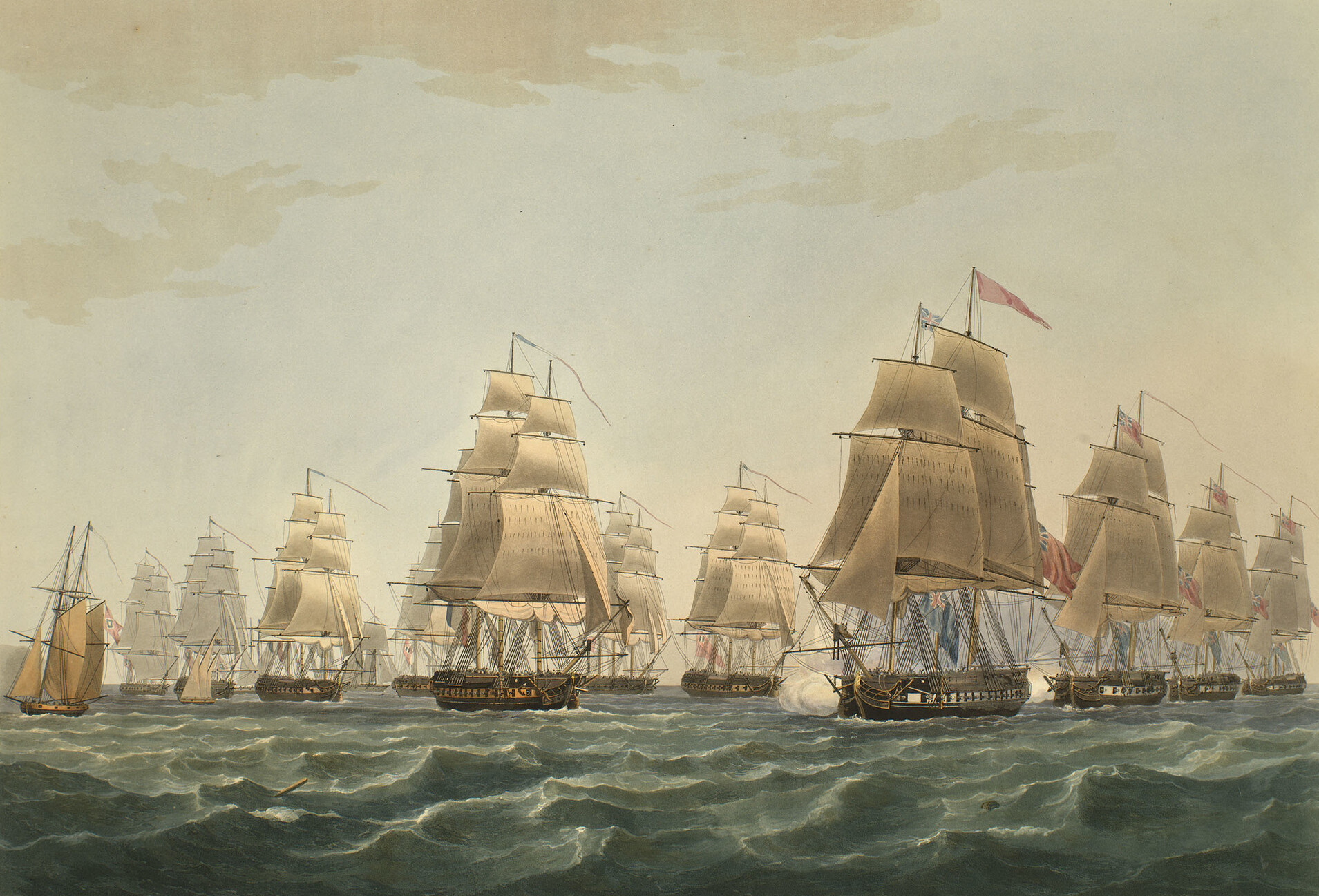
HMS Volage (first from right), which Hornby commanded at the Battle of Lissa in 1811

In 1804 following the Peace of Amiens, Hornby joined Horatio Nelson's flagship HMS Victory in the Mediterranean briefly before being posted to HMS Excellent with the admiral's recommendation. Excellent was detached from Nelson's fleet soon afterwards and in 1805 and 1806 participated in numerous operations on the Italian coast, particularly at Gaeta. Excellent was also present at the capture of Capri. Hornby was granted his first independent command in 1806, the small armed vessel HMS Duchess of Bedfordshire and in her fought off two large Spanish privateers. In 1807 he was promoted to commander and took over the sloop HMS Minorca in which he fought numerous engagements with Spanish gunboats off Cádiz.

In 1809, Minorca operated briefly with the squadron in the Adriatic Sea and the following year Hornby was promoted to post captain, becoming temporary commander of HMS Fame before moving to the small sixth rate HMS Volage to serve in the Adriatic squadron under William Hoste. Hornby was wounded in March 1811 during the Battle of Lissa, at which his ship fought a much larger French vessel and despite losing all but one gun, remained in combat throughout. For this action, he was much later awarded the Naval General Service Medal. Recovering from his injuries, Hornby took command of HMS Stag off the Cape of Good Hope the next year and later moved to HMS Spartan in the Mediterranean. While commander of Spartan, Hornby participated in the capture of Elba from the French, for which he was invested with the Austrian order of St Joseph of Würzburg.

== Later service ==
Hornby was appointed a Companion of the Order of the Bath on 4 June 1815, as part of the first list of Companions appointed after the restructuring of the Order earlier that year, and the following year paid off Spartan and entered semi-retirement. During his retirement, Hornby dabbled in politics, a supporter of the Earls of Derby.

In 1832, Hornby returned to service to promote his son's career through preferment, initially becoming superintendent of Plymouth Naval Hospital and in 1838 moving to become superintendent of the Woolwich Dockyard. He was appointed an extra naval aide-de-camp to His Majesty in 1836. In 1841 he became comptroller-general of the Coast Guard until 1846 when he was promoted to rear admiral. In order to further his son's career, Hornby then accepted the position of commander in chief of the Pacific Fleet, raising his flag in HMS Asia in 1847. He was promoted from rear-admiral of the blue to rear-admiral of the white in 1848, and then to rear-admiral of the red in 1851. In 1852 Hornby returned to Europe to serve as a Second Naval Lord under the Duke of Northumberland and was promoted to Knight Commander of the Order of the Bath (KCB). He remained in post until his final retirement in 1853, shortly after the fall of Lord Derby's government.

In retirement Hornby continued to receive honours (vice-admiral of the blue in 1854, vice-admiral of the white in 1855, vice-admiral of the red in 1857,), eventually being promoted full admiral (of the blue) in 1858 and becoming a Knight Grand Cross of the Order of the Bath in the 1861 Birthday Honours. He was promoted to admiral of the white in 1862, and to admiral of the red in 1863. He was appointed Rear Admiral of the United Kingdom in 1866. He died a widower at his estate in the village of Little Green near Petersfield in Hampshire on 19 March 1867.

== Personal life ==
In 1814, Hornby married Sophia Maria Burgoyne, daughter of General John Burgoyne. The couple had five daughters and three sons, including:

- Phipps Hornby (24 April 1820 – 8 April 1848), British Army officer and cricketer
- Sir Geoffrey Hornby (10 February 1825 – 3 March 1895), Royal Navy officer
- James Hornby (18 December 1826 – 2 November 1909), academic and headmaster of Eton College

== See also ==
- O'Byrne, William Richard (1849). "Hornby, Phipps" . A Naval Biographical Dictionary . John Murray – via Wikisource.

== Notes ==
Military offices
Preceded by Sir George Seymour	Commander-in-Chief Pacific Station; 1847–1850	Succeeded by Sir Fairfax Moresby
Preceded by Sir Houston Stewart	Second Naval Lord; 1852—1853	Succeeded by Sir Maurice Berkeley
Honorary titles
Preceded by Sir William Bowles	Rear-Admiral of the United Kingdom; 1866–1867	Succeeded by Sir Fairfax Moresby
