= Phipps Hornby (cricketer) =

English cricketer and army officer

Personal information
- Full name: Phipps John Hornby
- Born: 24 April 1820; England
- Died: 8 April 1848 (aged 27); Montreal, Quebec, Canada

Domestic team information
- Years: Team
- 1842: Hampshire

Career statistics
| Competition | First-class |
|---|---|
| Matches | 1 |
| Runs scored | 3 |
| Batting average | 1.50 |
| 100s/50s | 0/0 |
| Top score | 3 |
| Catches/stumpings | 0/– |
- Source: Cricinfo, 15 February 2010

Captain Phipps John Hornby (24 April 1820 – 8 April 1848) was an English army officer and first-class cricketer.

Phipps represented Hampshire county cricket team (pre-1864) in a single first-class cricket match in 1842 against Marylebone Cricket Club (MCC). He served with the Royal Engineers, where he gained the rank of captain. He died in April 1848 whilst serving at Montreal in Canada at the age of just 27.

== Family ==
Phipps was the son of Admiral Sir Phipps Hornby and Sophia Maria Burgoyne, Phipps' brothers were Geoffrey and James. Geoffrey had a notable career in the Royal Navy, where he became Admiral of the Fleet. James was a notable rower who rowed for Oxford and was later the headmaster of Eton College.
