= Vansittart (1813 EIC ship) =

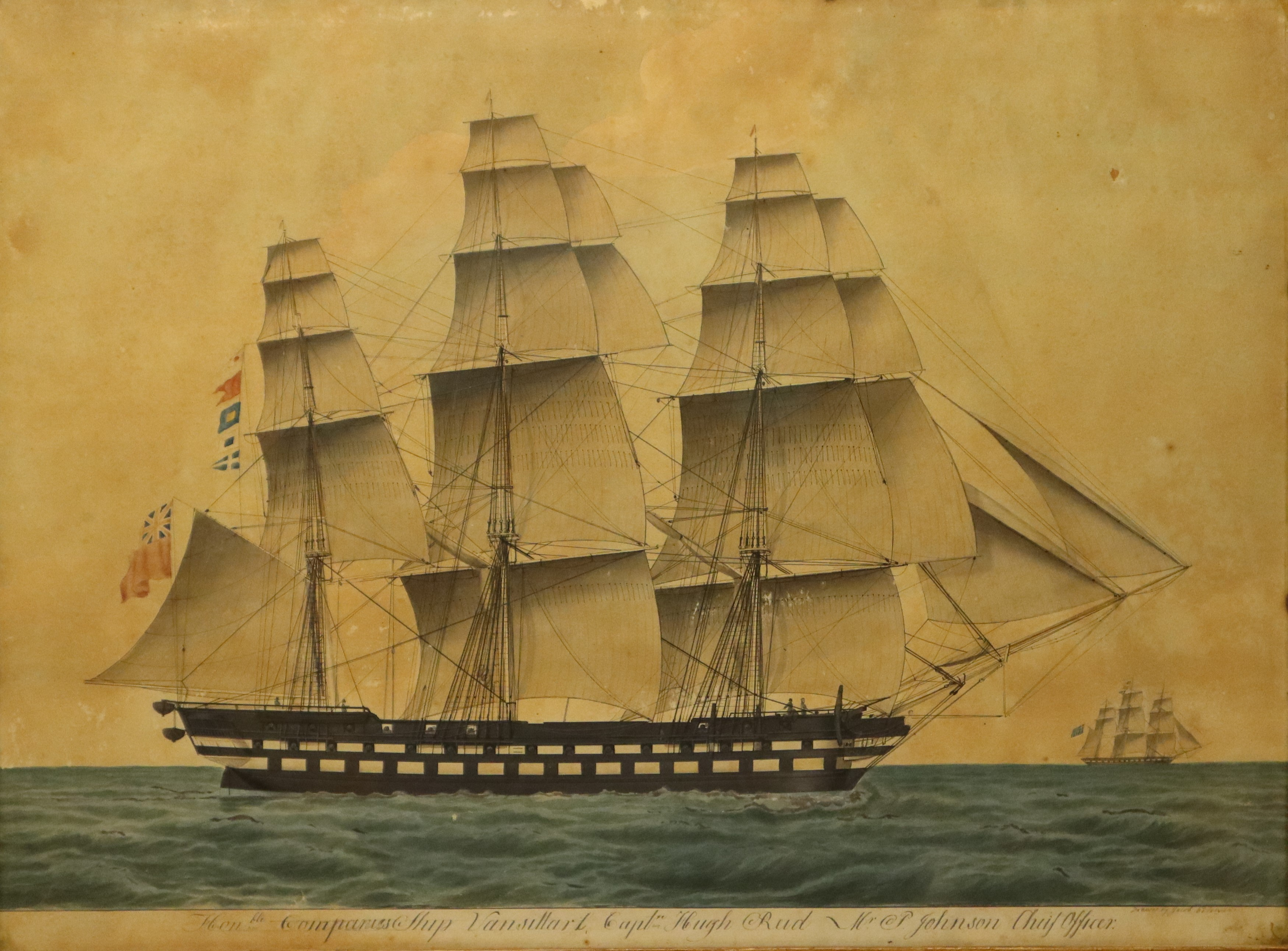
- Water colour of the "Honourable Company's Ship Vansittart", painted by Danish artist Jacob Petersen between 1814 and 1817. In the collections of Bornholms Museum, Denmark. Reg. nr. 1288x00022.

History

East India CompanyUK
- Name: Vansittart
- Owner: EIC voyage #1: Mangles; EIC voyages #2–3: James Mangles; EIC voyages 4–5: John Carstairs; EIC voyages 6–11: Joseph Hare
- Builder: Calcutta: Hugh Reid, or Gilmore & Co.
- Launched: 9 November 1813

United Kingdom
- Name: Vansittart
- Owner: Hare & Co.
- Acquired: 1834 by purchase
- Fate: Sold 1839

Denmark
- Name: Danske König
- Acquired: 1839 by nominal purchase
- Fate: Circa September 1840 gave up nominal Danish flag and ownership

United Kingdom
- Name: Vansittart
- Owner: Hare & Co.
- Acquired: Circa September 1840 resumed British registry
- Fate: Destroyed by fire 1842

General characteristics
- Type: Barque
- Tons burthen: 1272, or 1273, or 1311, or 131170/94, (bm)
- Length: 165 ft 8 1/4 in (50.5 m) (overall); 133 ft 7 in (40.7 m) (keel)
- Beam: 42 ft 4 in (12.9 m)
- Draught: 17 ft 1 in (5.2 m)
- Decks: Three
- Crew: 135
- Armament: 36 × 18-pounder guns

Vansittart was launched at Calcutta in 1813, for the India to China trade. However, she then became an East Indiaman for the British East India Company (EIC). She made 11 voyages for the EIC. Her owners then sold her and her new owners continued to sail her to China from London, the EIC's monopoly having ended. She carried opium from India to Canton. In 1839, she assumed a Danish name and registry as a short-lived subterfuge to evade Chinese government restrictions on the opium trade. By September 1840, she had reverted to her original name and British registry. A fire of questionable origin destroyed her at Bombay in 1842.

== EIC voyages ==
=== EIC voyage #1 (1813–1814) ===
Captain Hugh Reid sailed Vansitart for England, leaving Calcutta on 27 December 1813. She was at Saugor on 31 December. She left Saugor on 6 February 1814, reached Pointe de Galle on 17 February, and St Helena on 19 May.

On 18 May, as HMS Semiramis was approaching St Helena during the night, Vansittart hit and badly damaged her. Vansittart arrived at the Downs on 6 August.

Captain Robert Stair Dalrymple became Vansittart's master for her next seven voyages. On 17 December, Dalrymple received a letter of marque against vessels of the United States of America.

=== EIC voyage #2 (1815–1816) ===
Vansittart sailed from the Downs on 14 January 1815, bound for Bombay and China. She reached Bombay on 27 May, and left on 22 July. She arrived at Whampoa on 25 September. Homeward bound, she crossed the Second Bar on 21 January 1816, reached St Helena on 28 March, and arrived at the Downs on 12 May.

When Vansittart arrived back at London she discharged her crew, including her Chinese sailors hired in Canton. Princess Amelia repatriated 27 to Canton, together with 363 others, leaving the Downs on 20 July 1816.

=== EIC voyage #3 (1817–1818) ===
Vansittart left the Downs on 7 January 1817, bound for Bombay and China. She reached the Cape of Good Hope on 31 March, and Bombay on 31 May. She left Bombay on 27 July, reached Penang on 14 August, and arrived at Whampoa on 24 September. Vansittart was carrying a cargo of Turkish opium.

Homeward bound, Vansittart crossed the Second Bar on 20 December, reached St Helena on 24 March 1818, and arrived at the Downs on 4 June.

=== EIC voyage #4 (1819–1820) ===
Vansittart left the Downs on 28 January 1819, and reached Bombay on 1 June. She left Bombay on 25 July, and arrived at Whampoa on 17 September. She left China on 20 January 1820, and arrived at the Downs on 15 May.

=== EIC voyage #5 (1821–1822) ===
Vansittart left the Downs on 19 February 1821, bound for St Helena, Bombay, and China. She reached St Helena on 23 May, and arrived at Bombay on 29 August. She left Bombay on 23 October, reached Batavia on 27 December, and arrived at Whampoa on 7 March 1822. Homeward-bound she crossed the Second Bar on 18 April, reached St Helena on 9 August, and arrived at the Downs on 13 October.

=== EIC voyage #6 (1823–1824) ===
Vansittart left the Downs on 29 April 1823, bound for China. She arrived at Whampoa on 29 September. Homeward-bound, she crossed the Second Bar on 27 January 1824, reached St Helena on 13 April, and arrived at the Downs on 10 June.

=== EIC voyage #7 (1825–1826) ===
Vansittart left he Downs on 9 January 1825, bound for the Cape, Bombay, and China. She reached the Cape on 13 March, and Bombay on 31 May. She left Bombay on 11 August, and arrived at Whampoa on 1 October. Homeward-bound, she crossed the Second Bar on 1 January 1826, reached St Helena on 12 March, and arrived at the Downs on 16 May.

On 2 August 1826, the EIC accepted a tender from Joseph Hare for Vansittart for three voyages as a regular ship at a rate of £18 18s 6d per ton for 1200 tons (bm).

=== EIC voyage #8 (1827–1828) ===
Vansittart left the Downs on 18 February 1827, bound for Bengal and China. She reached Saugor on 4 June. She left on 20 August, reached Penang on 1 September, and arrived at Whampoa on 18 November. Homeward-bound, she crossed the Second Bar on 12 January 1828, reached St Helena on 11 April, and arrived at the Downs on 4 June.

For her last three voyages for the EIC, Vansittart's master was Robert Scott.

=== EIC voyage #9 (1829–1830) ===
Vansittart left the Downs on 4 May 1829, bound for China. She reached Singapore on 24 August, Urmston's Bay on 17 September, and Cap Sing Moon Bay on 17 November, before arriving at Whampoa on 10 February 1830. Homeward bound, she crossed the Second Bar on 17 March, reached St Helena on 13 July, and arrived at the Downs on 7 September.

=== EIC voyage #10 (1831–1832) ===
Vansittart left the Downs on 20 February 1831, bound for Bengal and China. She arrived at Saugor on 1 June, and left on 25 July. She reached Penang on 2 August, Malacca on 14 August, and Singapore on 22 August, before arriving at Whampoa on 20 September. Homeward-bound, she crossed the Second Bar on 1 November, reached st Helena on 26 January 1832, and arrived at the Downs on 18 March.

In 1832, the Chinese merchant who posted security for Vansittart was Fatqua, who gave 3906 taels as a security deposit for the vessel, her crew, and for the payment of customs duties.

On 25 July 1832, the EIC accepted a tender from Joseph Hare for Vansittart to make one voyage to China as a "dismantled ship" at a rate of £14 9s 6d per ton, for 1311 tons (bm).

=== EIC voyage #11 (1833–1834) ===
Vansittart left the Downs on 5 March 1833, bound for Madras, Bengal, and China. She reached Madras on 7 June, and Saugor or 18 June. She left Saugor on 18 June, reached Malacca on 7 September, and arrived at Whampoa on 13 October. Homeward-bound, she crossed the second Bar on 11 December, reached St Helena on 16 March 1834, and arrived at the Downs on 30 April.

== China ship ==
In 1834, Vansittart came off contract to the EIC, but remained under the ownership of Hare & Co. Lloyd's Register provides the following information:

Year	Master	Owner	Trade
1835	R.Scott; Marquis	Hare & Co.	London — China
1836	Marquis	Hare & Co.	London — China
1837	Marquis	Hare & Co.	London — China
1838	Marquis		London
1838	Marquis		London

Vansittart became an opium clipper, carrying opium from Bengal to Canton. She primarily carried 150-pound chests of opium from Malwa. The opium generally shared the vessel with cotton.

== Danish flag ==
In 1839, in the run-up to the First Opium War, the Chinese authorities banned any trade with Britain. British shipowners and their agents proceeded to sell their vessels to citizens of the United States, or others. Vansittart was sold in 1839, to Danish interests for £16,000. Her new owners renamed her Danske König (Danish King). James Matheson provided Danish papers on the basis of a consular commission granted by the Danish colony of Tranquebar. The head of the Danish establishment at Serampore reported to Copenhagen that although Danske König sailed under the Danish flag while in Chinese waters, she had visited Madras in early and mid-1840 under the name Vansittart, and flying the British flag.

The outbreak of the First Opium War in mid-1840, ended the Chinese restrictions on British vessels and trade with the United Kingdom. By September 1840, the Danish vice-consul in Manila reported that Vansittart had returned to her name and the English flag. He also reported that Matheson was abusing his office by issuing temporary papers.

== Fate ==
On 3 June 1842, Vansittart, Lyon, master, was in the harbour at Bombay ready for a voyage to China. At 2.a.m. a fire was discovered. Despite every assistance from steam and other vessels, "this fine ship was destroyed under very suspicious circumstances." Several lives were lost. (Note: Hackman gives 1848 as the year of loss, but the article describing the loss was published in 1847, and described the loss as occurring in 1842.)
