= SS Hornby =

History

United Kingdom
- Name: SS Hornby (1908-1935); SS Holman (1935-1961)
- Owner: Alexandra Towing Co. Ltd. (1908-1935); Newport Screw Towing Co. (1935-1961)
- Builder: John Cran & Co., Leith
- Yard number: 66
- Launched: 22 January 1908
- Identification: Official number: 127904; Code letters: MFPK
- Fate: Scrapped, 1961

General characteristics
- Type: Tugboat
- Tonnage: 168 GRT
- Length: 92 ft 1 in (28.07 m)
- Beam: 21 ft 1 in (6.43 m)
- Depth: 12 ft (3.7 m)
- Propulsion: 2-cylinder compound steam engine, single screw

SS Hornby was a tug tender which was based at Liverpool. She was built by John Cran & Co. at Leith, and launched on 22 January 1908. it became known for its assistance of the RMS Titanic, the ill-fated British ocean liner, following her launch from the Harland and Wolff slips on 31 May 1911. On 2 April 1912, Titanic was completed. Hornby tended to it again, this time during its sea trials. In 1935, Hornby was sold to the Newport Screw Towing Co., and renamed Holman. Then in 1961, it was broken up at Newport, Monmouthshire, UK.
