= HMS Emulous (1806) =

Brig-sloop of the Royal Navy

- Emulous

History

United Kingdom
- Name: HMS Emulous
- Ordered: 21 May 1805
- Builder: William Rowe, St Peter's Yard, Newcastle
- Laid down: December 1805
- Launched: June 1806
- Fate: Wrecked 1812

General characteristics
- Class & type: 18-gun Cruizer-class brig-sloop
- Tons burthen: 383 bm
- Length: 100 ft 0 in (30.5 m) (overall) 77 ft 4 3/4 in (23.6 m) (keel)
- Beam: 30 ft 6 1/4 in (9.3 m)
- Draught: 6 ft 10 in (2.1 m) (unladen) 11 ft 0 in (3.4 m) (laden)
- Depth of hold: 12 ft 9 1/2 in (3.9 m)
- Sail plan: Brig
- Armament: 16 × 32-pounder carronades; 2 × 6-pounder guns

HMS Emulous was a Royal Navy 18-gun Cruizer-class brig-sloop, built by William Row at Newcastle and launched in 1806. She survived an inconclusive but bloody battle with a French frigate during the Napoleonic Wars and captured a number of prizes, including two privateers, on the Halifax station during the War of 1812 before she was wrecked in 1812.

== Service ==
Emulous was commissioned under Commander Gustavus Stupart for convoys and cruising. (Note: For more on Gustavus Stupart see: O'Byrne, William R. (1849). "Stupart, Gustavus" . A Naval Biographical Dictionary. London: John Murray.) She sailed with a Halifax convoy on 18 August 1807 and spent in 1808-1809 in American waters.

On 11 April 1807 Emulous and the gun-brig Cracker recaptured Rochdale.

On 9 November 1809 Emulous repelled a French 32-gun frigate off Puerto Rico. The action took place at pistol-shot range and lasted for one hour and 40 minutes. Emulous was badly damaged and lost 10 men killed and 20 wounded before she could escape.

On 10 March 1810, she and Halifax captured the schooner Spitfire. Stupart was made post-captain on 21 October 1810. (Note: Stupart's share of the prize money was £423 s 5¾d; the share of an able seaman on Emulous was £3 2¾d.)

In November 1810, Captain William Howe Mulcaster took command. On 25 July 1811, Emulous captured the French letter of marque Adele, which was pierced for 16 guns but only carried two. She had a crew of 35 men and was carrying cotton from Charlestown to Nantes.

In July, Emulous alone or with Spartan, captured eight small prizes:

- 11 July: brig Illuminator, of 254 tons, sailing from Havana to Boston with a cargo of molasses, sugar, coffee, and hides;
- 12 July: schooner Lively, of 78 tons, sailing from St. Bartholomew's to Boston with a cargo of molasses and sugar;
- 12 July: schooner Traveller, of 108 tons, sailing from Georgia to Alexandria with a cargo of live oak timber;
- 13 July: ship Maria, of 344 tons, sailing from Cadiz to New York in ballast but carrying dollars;
- 15 July: brig Cordelia, of 197 tons, sailing from Figuera to Boston with a cargo of fruit and dollars;
- 16 July: brig Belleisle, of 119 tons, sailing from Havana to Salem with a cargo of molasses, sugar, and coffee; and lastly, together with Spartan,
- 17 July, Spartan in sight: brig George, of 211 tons, sailing from Messina to Salem with a cargo of wine, brandy, opium, oil, etc.; and
- 18 July, together with Spartan: schooner Hiram, of 132 tons, sailing from Lisbon to Salem with a cargo of fruit and dollars. (Note: In June 1815, a payment of prize money for Cordelia resulted in a payment of £782 19s 2¾d to Mulcaster; an ordinary seaman received £16 18s 9¼d. For an ordinary seaman, this would have represented the equivalent of over six months' wages. That same month, a payment for Maria netted Mulcaster £1246 2s 6½d; an ordinary seaman received £27 9s 9d. Each of the payments to Mulcaster represented the equivalent of several years' wages. A payment for Hiram amounted to £232 0s 7d to Mulcaster, and £2 18s 1½d for an ordinary seaman.)

Then on 30 July 1812, after a short chase Emulous captured the American privateer Gossamer, off Cape Sable. Gossamer had a crew of 100 men and 14 guns on carriages, and was under the command of Captain C. Goodrich. She had left Boston on 24 June and had made only one capture, albeit an important one, Mary Jane, of Greenock, which had been sailing from Jamaica to Quebec. Mary Jane was relatively heavily armed for a merchantman as she carried eight 12-pounder carronades and two 6-pounder guns. Her capture netted her American captors $40,000. (Note: Three years later a payment of prize money for Gossamer amounted to £218 17s 11½d for Mulcaster and £4 14s 8½d for an ordinary seaman.)

== Fate ==
On 2 August 1812 Colibri met up with Emulous and reported that an American privateer was said to be sheltering nearby. The two set out together and as they approached the coast Emulous suddenly grounded. During the efforts to get her off, Colibri took off all non-essential crew and the prisoners she had on board. Shortly thereafter Emulous fell over onto her beam-ends and became unsalvageable. Her position was some 19 miles from Cape Sable Island, Nova Scotia.

The subsequent court martial admonished Mulcaster to be more careful in the future. It reprimanded Lieutenant Thomas Fowler, the officer of the watch, for failing to send for the pilot when they came into shallow water. It also severely reprimanded the Master, John Wilson, for not having taken depth soundings during his watch.

== Legacy ==
- Namesake of Emulous Reef on Ram Island, Lockeport Harbor, Nova Scotia.
