= HMS Spartan (1806) =

UK frigate (1806–1822)

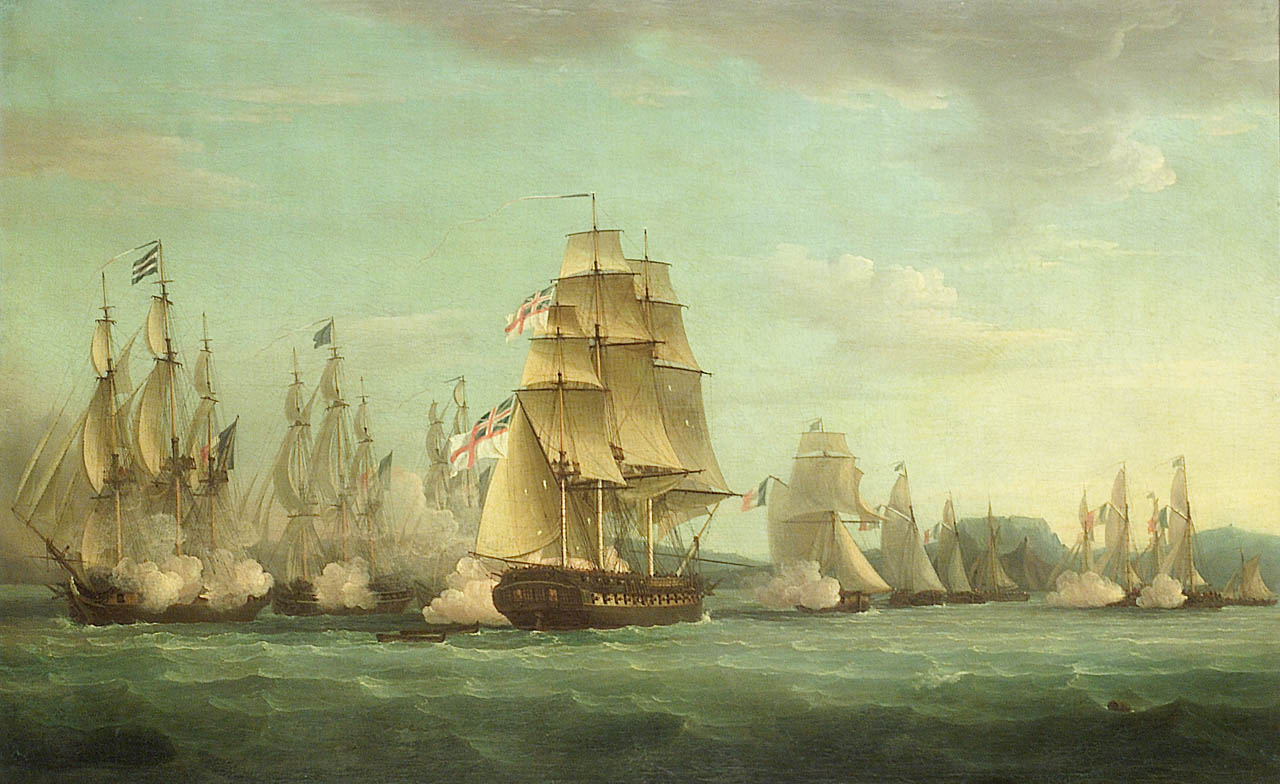
- HMS Spartan attacks a French squadron in the Bay of Naples, 3 May 1810, by Thomas Whitcombe

History

United Kingdom
- Name: HMS Spartan
- Ordered: 24 August 1805
- Builder: Charles Ross, Rochester, Kent
- Laid down: October 1805
- Launched: 16 August 1806
- Completed: 6 October 1806, at Chatham Dockyard
- Fate: Broken up at Plymouth Dockyard, April 1822

General characteristics
- Class & type: Lively-class frigate
- Tons burthen: 1,071 51/94 tons bm (as designed)
- Length: 154 ft (47 m)
- Beam: 39 ft 5 in (12.01 m)
- Draught: 13 ft 6 in (4.11 m)
- Propulsion: Sail
- Sail plan: Full-rigged ship
- Complement: 284 (later raised to 300, then in 1813 to 320)
- Armament: As ordered : UD: 28 × 18-pounder guns; QD: 2 × 9-pounder guns + 12 × 32-pounder carronades; FC: 2 × 9-pounder guns + 2 × 32-pounder carronades

HMS Spartan was a Royal Navy 38-gun fifth-rate frigate, launched at Rochester in 1806. During the Napoleonic Wars she was active in the Adriatic and in the Ionian Islands. She then moved to the American coast during the War of 1812, where she captured a number of small vessels, including a US Revenue Cutter and a privateer, the Dart. She then returned to the Mediterranean, where she remained for a few years. She went on to serve off the American coast again, and in the Caribbean, before being broken up in 1822.

== Napoleonic Wars ==
Spartan's first captain was George Astle, but he was soon replaced by Captain Jahleel Brenton, who took Spartan to the Adriatic Sea for service in the Adriatic campaign. In May 1807, Spartan engaged Annibal, two frigates (Pomone and Incorruptible), and the corvette Victorieuse off Cabrera in the Mediterranean.

Spartan was very active in the region, attacking numerous French coastal convoys, towns and small warships and in 1809 was employed in attacks on the Ionian Islands, landing troops on Zante and Cerigo in successful amphibious operations. Spartan was in action with HMS Mercury and HMS Amphion at Pesaro on 23 April, and at Cesenatico on 2 May.

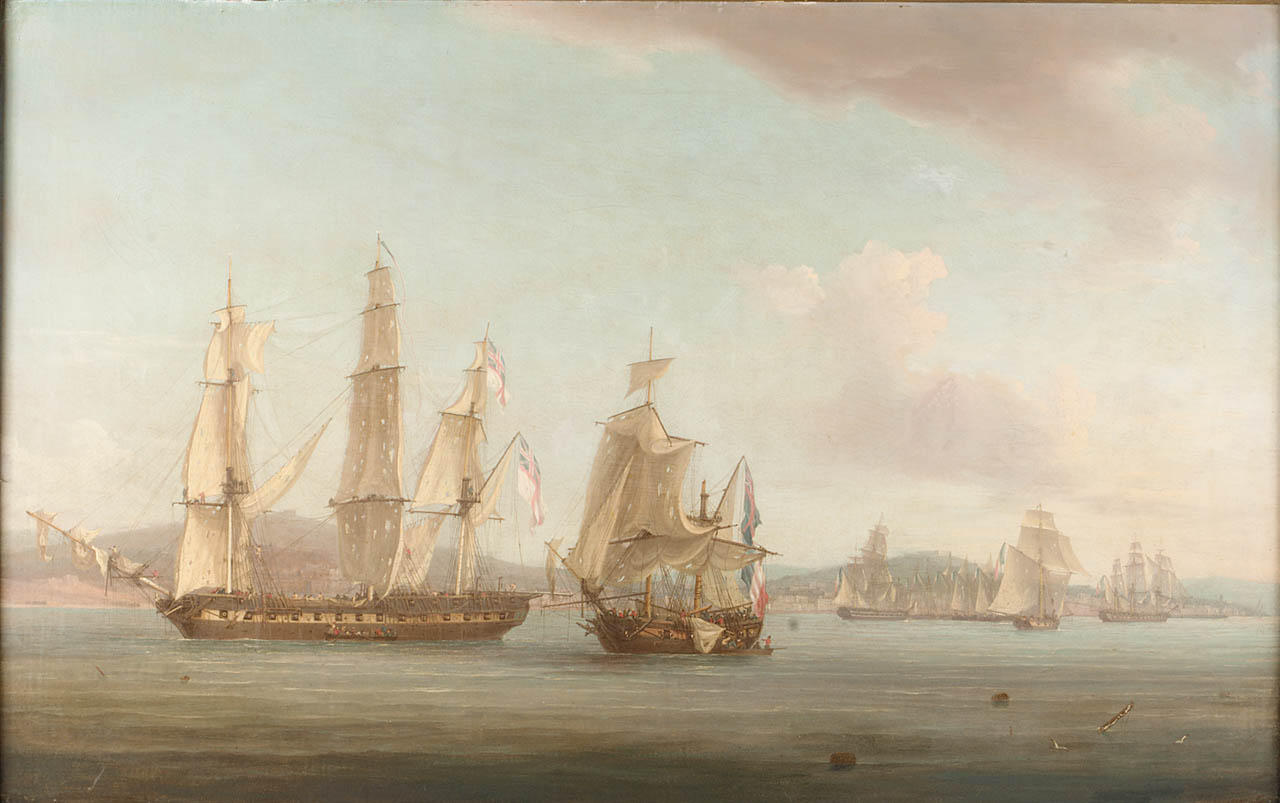
Spartan, having defeated the French Squadron, takes possession of the captured Brig Sparviére, Bay of Naples, 3 May 1810

In 1810, Spartan was operating off Naples and there fought an inconclusive engagement against a much larger Neapolitan squadron on 3 May, for which Brenton was highly rewarded.

== War of 1812 ==
The Spartan had been in North America, since departing Portsmouth on 25 July 1811. In 1811, Brenton's brother Edward Pelham Brenton took command and operated off the American Eastern Seaboard during the War of 1812, attacking shipping off Cape Sable but otherwise having little success against American merchant ships.

In July 1812, Spartan and Emulous captured three American vessels:

- 16 July: schooner Active, Peterson, master, of Salem, with 2 guns and 20 or 22 men. The capture took place off Cape Sable. Spartan burnt the schooner.
- 17 July: brig George, of 211 tons, sailing from Messina to Salem with a cargo of wine, brandy, opium, oil, etc.; (Note: A first-class share for George was worth £564 1s 5 1/2d; a sixth class share was worth £7 1s 3 3/4d.) and
- 18 July: schooner Hiram, of 132 tons, sailing from Lisbon to Salem with a cargo of fruit and dollars.

On 15 July Spartan and Juniper captured the brig Start. Start, of 173 tons (bm), P.Hazelton, master, had been sailing from St Ubes to Newburyport, Massachusetts with a cargo of salt. (Note: Start had been launched at Newbury, Massachusetts in 1811.)

The boats of Spartan and Maidstone captured the US Revenue Cutter Commodore Barry on 3 August in the Little River, Bay of Fundy, together with three privateer schooners, Madison, Olive, and Spence (or Spruce). Commodore Barry was armed with six guns and each of the schooners was armed with two guns. Before the British captured the vessels their crews escaped. They had erected batteries on shore, using the guns from their vessels. They resisted, inflicting some casualties, but then evaded capture. Even so, some men were captured on Commodore Barry and remained prisoners of war until paroled in June 1813. Prize money to the crew of the Spartan for the Commodore Barry was paid in July 1820. (Note: A first-class share, that of a captain, was worth £59 11s 11 1/4d; a sixth-class share, that of an ordinary seaman, was worth 11s 6 1/4d.)

Spartan was part of Sir John Borlase Warren's squadron when on 17 September she captured Melantho, an American ship returning from Chile and bound to Baltimore. Spartan sent Melantho into Halifax, Nova Scotia, where the Vice admiralty court condemned her in prize. Spartan shared the prize money with Statira, Acasta, Nymphe, Orpheus, Maidstone, Aeolus and Emulous. (Note: A first-class share of the prize money was worth £371 11s 3 1/4d; a sixth-class share was worth £3 16s 4 1/4.)

On 17 October 1812 Maidstone and Spartan were in company when Maidstone captured the American privateer brig Rapid on the Saint George's Bank. Rapid, of 190 tons (bm), John Weeks, master, was armed with 14 cannon – twelve carronades of various sizes and two long 6-pounder guns – but her crew had thrown eight of her cannons overboard to lighten her during the nine-hour chase. She had a crew of 84 men and was three days out of Portland. Her backers had provisioned her for a three-month cruise first off the Azores, Madeira and the Cape Verde Islands, and then off Cayenne and Bermuda. The British took Rapid into service as HMS Nova Scotia, which in 1813 they renamed Ferret.

In 1814, Spartan returned to Portsmouth, where command passed to Phipps Hornby, who briefly served with her in the Mediterranean. While commander of Spartan, Hornby participated in the capture of Elba from the French, for which he was invested with the Austrian order of St Joseph of Würzburg.

== Post-war ==
With the end of the war in 1815, Spartan remained in the Mediterranean under Captain William Furlong Wise, who in 1818 was able to negotiate compensation of $35,000 from the current Dey of Algiers following the depredations of Algerian pirates under the previous Dey, who had died of the plague.

== Fate ==
In 1819 and 1820, Spartan visited the Caribbean and North America. Spartan was laid up and then broken up in 1822.
