= Nathaniel Haraden =

- Born: March 12, 1768; Gloucester, Massachusetts
- Died: January 13, 1818 (aged 49) Washington D.C.
- Branch: U.S. Navy
- Service years: 1802–1804
- Rank: Master commandant
- Commands: USS Constitution
- Conflicts: First Barbary War; Second Battle of Tripoli Harbor
- Spouses: Mary Demack (m.1802); Susan Devericks (m.1812)
- Children: 4

Nathaniel Haraden (March 12, 1768 – January 20, 1818) was an American sailing master, veteran of the First Barbary War, and the 3rd commander of the USS Constitution.

== Early life ==
Nathaniel Haraden (also spelt as Harraden) was born in 1768 in Gloucester, Massachusetts to Nathaniel Harraden Sr. (1728–1787) and Mary Kimball (1732–1772). Harraden Sr. was a veteran of the American Revolutionary War and fought as a privateersman. Nathaniel married Mary Demack on September 26, 1802, and they had three daughters.

== Military Career ==
On June 30, 1802, Haraden is appointed as commander of the USS Constitution, succeeding Silas Talbot. During his leadership, Haraden had major repairs to the ship's planking, replacing the original copper sheathing, re-rigging, and fitting new yards in August of 1803. After his tenure as commander ended on May 14, 1803, Captain Edward Preble succeeded him and Haraden stayed aboard the Constitution as a sailing master and was aboard the ship during the Second Battle of Tripoli Harbor during the First Barbary War from August 3, to September 10, 1804 and was placed in charge of Gunboat No. 8.

== Post-War Life ==
Haraden returned to the U.S. in 1804, and was in charge of the Ordinary at the Washington Navy Yard from 1806 to 1807. In 1807, he was put in charge of Gunboats Nos. 57 and 58 in Norfolk, Virginia, and commissioned as a lieutenant. Later, he returned to the Washington Navy Yard as second officer under Captain Thomas Tingey, and helped rebuild the yard after it was burned down in 1814 following the American defeat at Bladensburg and the British occupation of the capital during the War of 1812. He was promoted to master commandant on April 16, 1816. Haraden died January 20, 1818 in Washington, D.C. The town of Gloucester, Massachusetts erected a monument in his honor in 1932. He also married Susan Devericks in 1812 and had one daughter with her before his death.
