= USS Somers =

USS Somers may refer to:

- USS Somers (1812), was a schooner that fought on Lake Erie and Huron during the War of 1812. She was captured by the British in 1814.
- USS Somers (1842), was a brig launched in 1842 and sunk in 1846. The ship is known for the Somers Affair.
- USS Somers (TB-22), was a torpedo boat purchased in 1898 and sold in 1920
- USS Somers (DD-301), was a Clemson-class destroyer launched in 1918, commissioned in 1920 and scrapped in 1931
- USS Somers (DD-381), was a Somers-class destroyer launched, commissioned in 1937 and scrapped in 1947
- USS Somers (DD-947), was a Forrest Sherman-class destroyer launched in 1958, commissioned in 1959 and sunk as target in 1998

== See also ==
- Master Commandant Richard Somers, a U.S. Navy officer killed in a daring assault during the First Barbary War
