= USS Sylvia =

USS Sylvia has been the name of more than one United States Navy ship, and may refer to:

- USS Sylvia (1882), a patrol yacht in commission from June to December 1898 and from 1917 to 1919
- USS Sylvia (SP-471), later USS SP-471, a patrol vessel in commission from 1917 to 1919
