= USS Somers (TB-22) =

Torpedo boat of the United States Navy

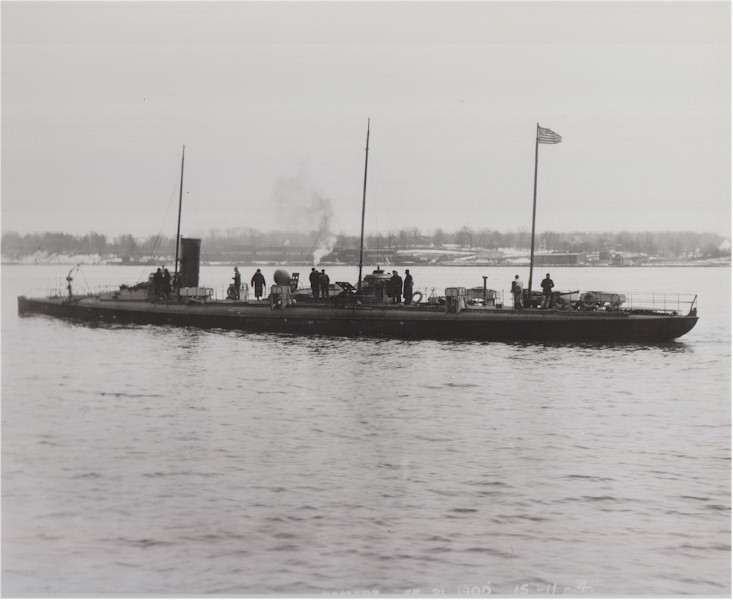
- USS Somers (TB-22), 21 February 1900, location unknown.

History

German Empire
- Name: No. 450
- Namesake: Master Commandant Richard Somers
- Builder: Ferdinand Schichau, Elbing, German Empire
- Laid down: 1897
- Fate: Sold, 25 March 1898, to the US Navy

United States
- Name: Somers
- Namesake: Master Commandant Richard Somers
- Acquired: purchased, 25 March 1898
- Commissioned: 28 March 1898
- Decommissioned: 1901
- Operator: Reserve Torpedo Flotilla at the Norfolk Navy Yard
- In service: 1901
- Out of service: 1909
- Operator: Maryland Naval Militia
- In service: 26 June 1909
- Out of service: 1914
- Operator: US Navy
- Commissioned: 17 August 1914
- Decommissioned: 13 October 1914
- Operator: Illinois Naval Militia
- In service: 13 October 1914
- Out of service: 1919
- Operator: US Navy
- Commissioned: 1919
- Decommissioned: 22 March 1919
- Renamed: Coast Torpedo Boat No. 9, 1 August 1918
- Stricken: 7 October 1919
- Fate: Sold for scrapping, 19 July 1920
- Notes: name changed so it could be used for USS Somers (DD-301)

General characteristics
- Class & type: Somers-class torpedo boat
- Displacement: As Somers: 143 long tons (145 t); As Coastal Torpedo Boat No. 9: 150 long tons (150 t)
- Length: 156 ft (48 m)
- Beam: 17 ft 6 in (5.33 m)
- Draft: 5 ft 10 in (1.78 m)
- Installed power: As Somers: 1,700 ihp (1,300 kW); As Coastal Torpedo Boat No. 9: 1,900 ihp (1,400 kW)
- Propulsion: 1 × vertical quadruple-expansion reciprocating steam engine; 1 × Loco boiler; 1 × screw
- Speed: As Somers: 23 kn (26 mph; 43 km/h); 15 kn (17 mph; 28 km/h) (Speed on Trial); As Coastal Torpedo Boat No. 9: 17.5 kn (20.1 mph; 32.4 km/h)
- Capacity: 38 short tons (34 t) coal
- Complement: As Somers: 24; As Coastal Torpedo Boat No. 9: 34
- Armament: As Somers: 4 × 1-pounder (37 mm (1.46 in)) guns; 3 × 18 inch (450 mm) torpedo tubes; As Coastal Torpedo Boat No. 9: 3 × 1-pounder (37 mm (1.46 in)) guns; 1 × machine gun; 1 × Y-gun depth charge projector

The third USS Somers (Torpedo Boat No. 22/TB-22/Coast Torpedo Boat No. 9), a steel torpedo boat built as a private speculation by Friedrich Schichau, Elbing, Germany, was launched in 1897 as yard No. 450; purchased for the United States Navy on 25 March 1898; commissioned on 28 March 1898 and named Somers the next day.

== Service history ==
Purchased through Schichau's London representative as the U.S. prepared for a possible war against Spain, Somers sailed for England on 30 March, manned by a German contract crew. On 5 April, she arrived at Weymouth, whence she was to be escorted across the Atlantic by the gunboat Topeka. However, the British crew contracted for the voyage thought Somers was unsafe and refused to take her out to sea. A second attempt to sail also failed, and the torpedo boat was ordered laid up at Falmouth until the conclusion of the Spanish–American War.

Somers arrived at New York, on board SS Manhattan, on 2 May 1899 and remained at the New York Navy Yard until 8 October 1900, when she got underway for League Island, Pa. Subsequently, decommissioned there, she was reassigned to the Reserve Torpedo Flotilla at the Norfolk Navy Yard, where she was based from 1901–1909. On 26 June 1909, she was loaned to the Maryland Naval Militia and made periodic training cruises from Baltimore until returned to the Navy in 1914.

Scheduled for transfer to the Illinois Naval Militia, Somers was recommissioned on 17 August 1914 for the passage to Cairo, Ill., where she was decommissioned and transferred to the state of Illinois on 13 October. Later renamed and redesignated Coast Torpedo Boat No. 9 to allow the name Somers to be given to destroyer number 301, she served as a training ship until returned to Navy custody after the end of World War I. She was commissioned for the passage back to the east coast and returned to Philadelphia where she was decommissioned on 22 March 1919. Her name was struck from the Naval Vessel Register on 7 October 1919, and her hulk was sold for scrapping on 19 July 1920 to the U.S. Rail and Salvage Corp., Newburgh, N.Y.
