= USS Intrepid (1798) =

United States warship

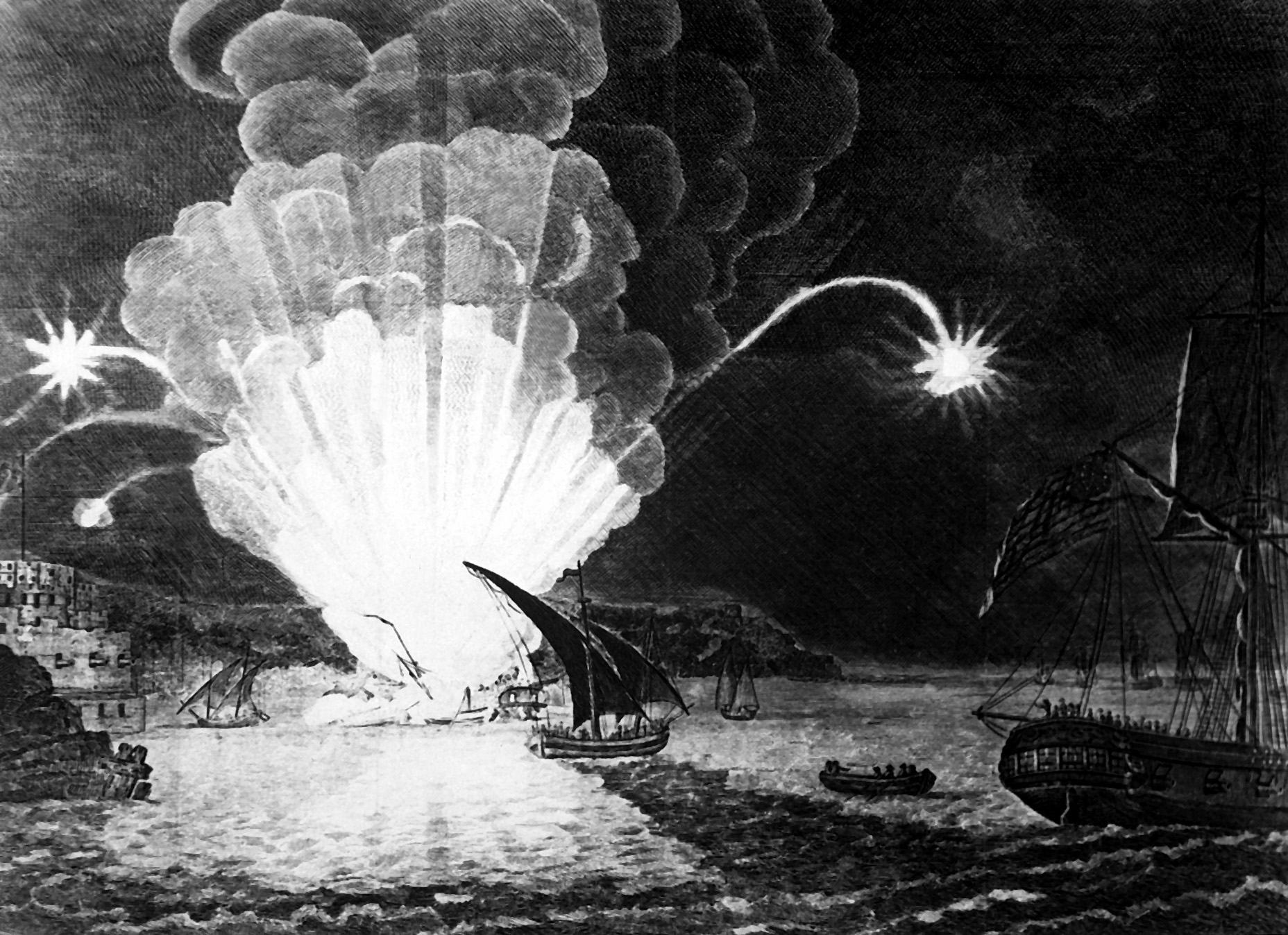
- A copy of an engraving of the destruction of the fire ship Intrepid

History

United States
- Name: USS Intrepid
- Cost: $1,800 purchased
- Launched: 1798
- Acquired: by capture, 23 December 1803
- Fate: Destroyed in action, 4 September 1804

General characteristics
- Type: Bomb ketch, used as an Explosion ship
- Tonnage: 64
- Length: 60 ft (18 m)
- Beam: 12 ft (3.7 m)
- Propulsion: Sail
- Complement: 70 officers and enlisted
- Armament: 4 guns

The first USS Intrepid was a captured ketch rigged galiot in the United States Navy during the First Barbary War.

Intrepid was built in France in 1798 for Napoleon's Egyptian expedition. The vessel was sold to Tripoli, which she served as Mastico (referred to as "Martigana" in one document). The bomb ketch was one of several Tripolitan vessels which captured Philadelphia on 31 October 1803 after the American frigate had run fast aground on uncharted Kaliusa reef some five miles (8 km) east of Tripoli.

== Capture ==
USS Enterprise, a schooner with Lt. Stephen Decatur in command, captured Mastico on 23 December 1803 as it was sailing from Tripoli to Constantinople under Turkish colors and without passports. After a time-consuming search for a translator, the ketch's papers and the testimony of an English ship master who had been in Tripoli to witness her role in operations against Philadelphia convinced the commander of the American squadron, Commodore Edward Preble, that Mastico was a legitimate prize. He took her into the U.S. Navy and renamed her Intrepid.

== Destruction of USS Philadelphia ==
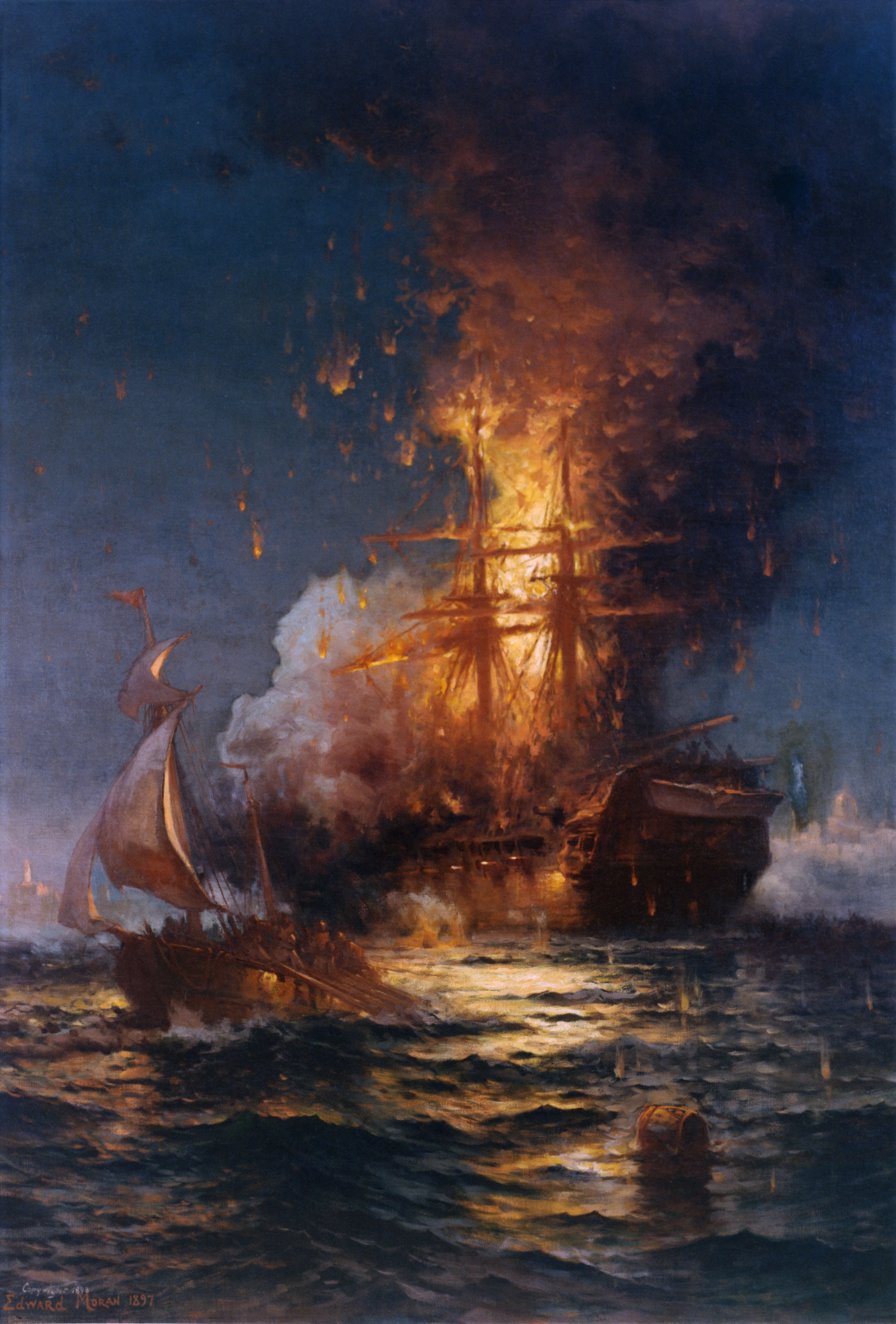
Burning of the Frigate Philadelphia in the Harbor of Tripoli by Edward Moran (1897) Intrepid depicted in foreground

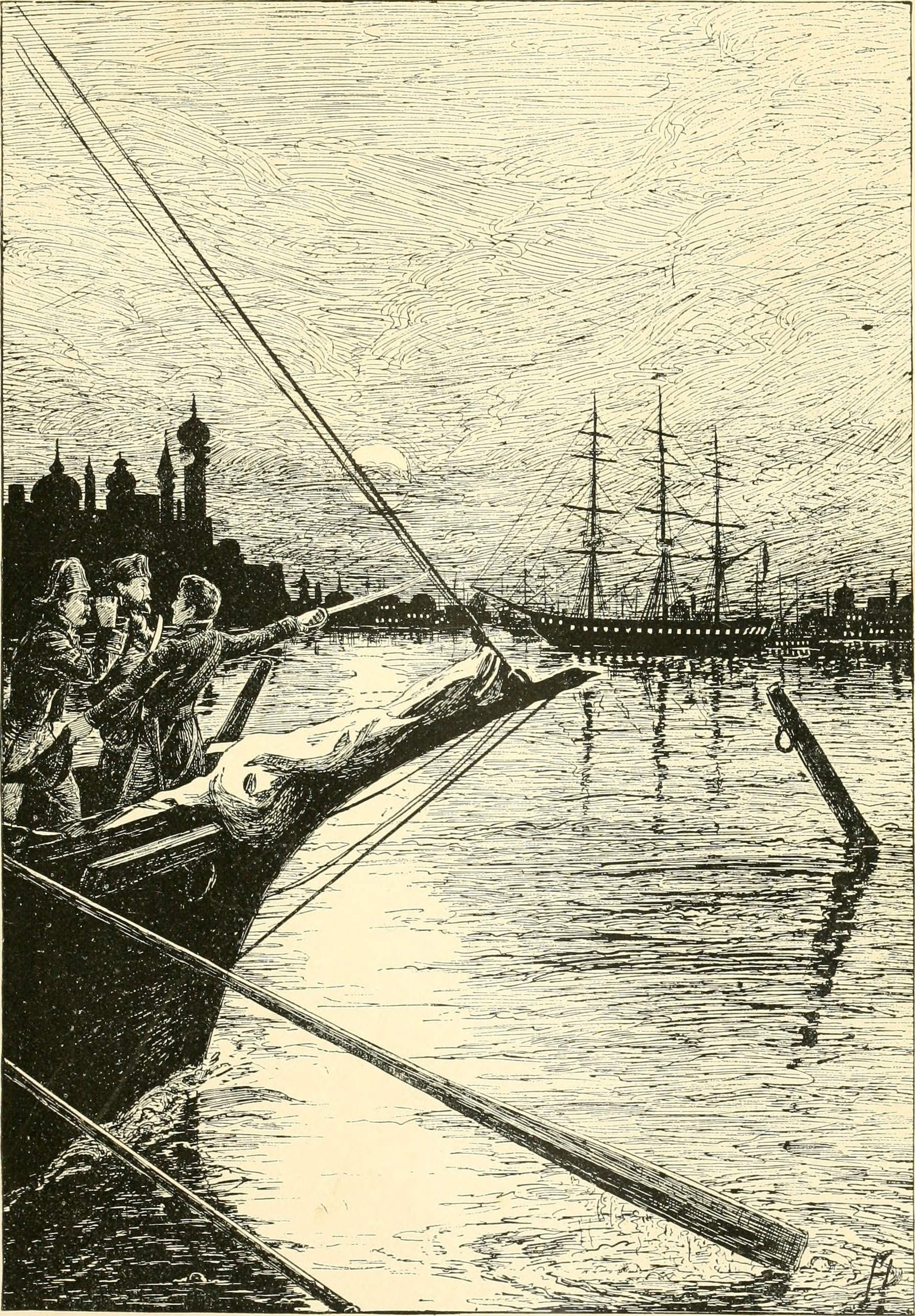
US Navy sailors onboard USS Intrepid scout Tripoli Harbor. 1887 illustration of the 1804 battle.

Meanwhile, Philadelphia lay in Tripoli Harbor threatening to become Tripoli's largest and most powerful corsair. Preble decided that he must destroy the frigate before the enemy could fit her out for action against his squadron. In order to take the Tripolitans by surprise, he assigned the task to the only ship which could be sure of passing as a North African vessel, Intrepid. He appointed Lieutenant Stephen Decatur captain of the ketch on 31 January 1804 and ordered him to prepare her for a month's cruise to Tripoli in company with Syren. Preble's orders directed Decatur to slip into harbor at night, to board and burn the frigate, and make good his retreat in Intrepid, unless it then seemed feasible to use her as a fire ship against other shipping in the harbor. In the latter case, he was to escape in boats to Syren which would await just outside the harbor.

Intrepid and Syren set sail 2 February and arrived off Tripoli five days later. However, bad weather delayed the operation until 16 February. That evening Syren took station outside the harbor and launched her boats to stand by for rescue work. At 7 o'clock Intrepid entered the harbor and 2½ hours later was alongside Philadelphia. When hailed, they claimed to be traders who had lost their anchor in the late gale, and begged permission to make fast to the frigate till morning. Guards suddenly noticed the ketch still had her anchors and gave the alarm. Leaving a small force commanded by Surgeon Lewis Heermann on board Intrepid, Decatur led 60 of his men to the deck of the frigate. A brief struggle, conducted without firing a gun, gave the Americans control of the vessel enabling them to set her ablaze. Decatur, the last man to leave the burning frigate, remained on board Philadelphia until flames blazed from the hatchways and ports of her spar deck. When he finally left the ship, her rigging and tops were afire. Shore batteries opened up on Intrepid as she escaped only to be answered from abandoned Philadelphia when her guns discharged by the heat of the conflagration.

When Lord Nelson, then blockading Toulon, heard of Intrepid's feat, he is said to have called it "the most bold and daring act of the age".

Intrepid returned to Syracuse on 19 February, and the next day her crew returned to their original ships. The ketch was decommissioned and remained in Syracuse with only a midshipman and 3 or 4 men on board as noted on 22 February in USS Constitution's logbook. She became a hospital ship on 1 June and continued this duty through July. She departed Syracuse on 12 August for Malta, where she took on board fresh supplies for the squadron and departed on 17 August. She rejoined the squadron off Tripoli on 22 August. On 22 August, 1804 Midshipman Joseph Israel was given command. Shortly after that he was promoted to Lieutenant.

== Fire ship ==
A week later she began to be fitted out as a "floating volcano" and was to be sent into the harbor and blown up in the midst of the corsair fleet close under the walls of Tripoli. The vessel was loaded with 100 barrels of powder and 150 fixed shells, the fuses leading to the explosives were calculated to burn for 15 minutes. Carpenters of every ship were pressed into service and she was ready on 1 September, but unfavorable weather delayed the operation until 4 September. That day, Lieutenant Richard Somers assumed command of the fire ship. Volunteers for the mission also included Midshipman Henry Wadsworth and ten seamen. Shortly after Intrepid got underway, Midshipman Joseph Israel arrived with last-minute orders from Commodore Preble and insisted on accompanying the expedition.

Two of the fastest rowing vessels were chosen to assist in the mission and return the volunteers from the mission. At eight o'clock on 4 September Intrepid got underway with Argus, Vixen, and Nautilus serving as escorts up to the point by the rocks near the harbor's entrance, remaining there to watch and pick up the returning rowing boats and return the crew from their mission. As Intrepid approached the enemy fleet they were discovered and fired upon by carronades from the overlooking shore batteries. At 8:30 before Intrepid could get to its final position it exploded, lighting up the entire scene and sending the hull, yards and rigging and exploding shells in all directions, killing all on board. The anxious crews of the awaiting squadron were shaken by the concussion of the great explosion but at this time could not determine the exact fate of the mission. They remained there the entire night with the hope that the rowing vessels would return with the volunteers, but by morning their hopes turned to despair when the light of day finally revealed what had happened. Commodore Preble later concluded that an attempt was made by intercepting boarding vessels, and that Somers decided to destroy the vessel, himself, and his crew to avoid capture and enslavement, but there was no way of knowing the exact events which resulted in the explosion.

== Aftermath ==
The remains of the 13 sailors on the ship washed ashore the next day after the explosion and were dragged through the street by angry locals. The bodies were buried in an unmarked mass grave outside Tripoli. In 1949, the Libyan government unearthed the remains and moved them to the current cemetery. Rear Admiral Richard H. Cruzen, veteran of two expeditions to Antarctica, represented the U.S. Navy at the ceremony unveiling the monument to the fallen sailors on 2 April 1949. Since then, the Libyan government has maintained the grave site, although sometimes has allowed maintenance of the site to deteriorate. On 17 December 2011, US defense chief Leon Panetta visited the cemetery in Tripoli and placed a wreath at the grave site. The US has no plans to repatriate the remains to the US.

== See also ==
- Second Battle of Tripoli Harbor

== Bibliography ==
- MacKenzie, Alexander Slidell (1846). Life of Stephen Decatur: a commodore in the Navy of the United States. C. C. Little and J. Brown, 1846 – Biography & Autobiography. pp. 443. Url
- Waldo, Samuel Putnam (1821). The life and character of Stephen Decatur.
  P. B. Goodsell, Hartford, Conn., 1821. Url
- Dept U.S.Navy. "Ships Histories Dictionary of American Naval Fighting Ships".
  Dictionary of American Naval Fighting Ships.
  Department of the Navy – Naval Historical Center. Archived from the original on 19 August 2000.
- Colimore, Edward (25 October 2011). "Effort under way to bring back U.S. sailors buried in Libya". The Philadelphia Inquirer. "[E]ight of the 13 sailors [are] interred beneath Green Square in Tripoli .... Nearby are the graves of five more, ... at a tiny, walled cemetery that overlooks the harbor."
