= USS Preble (DDG-46) =

American guided missile destroyer

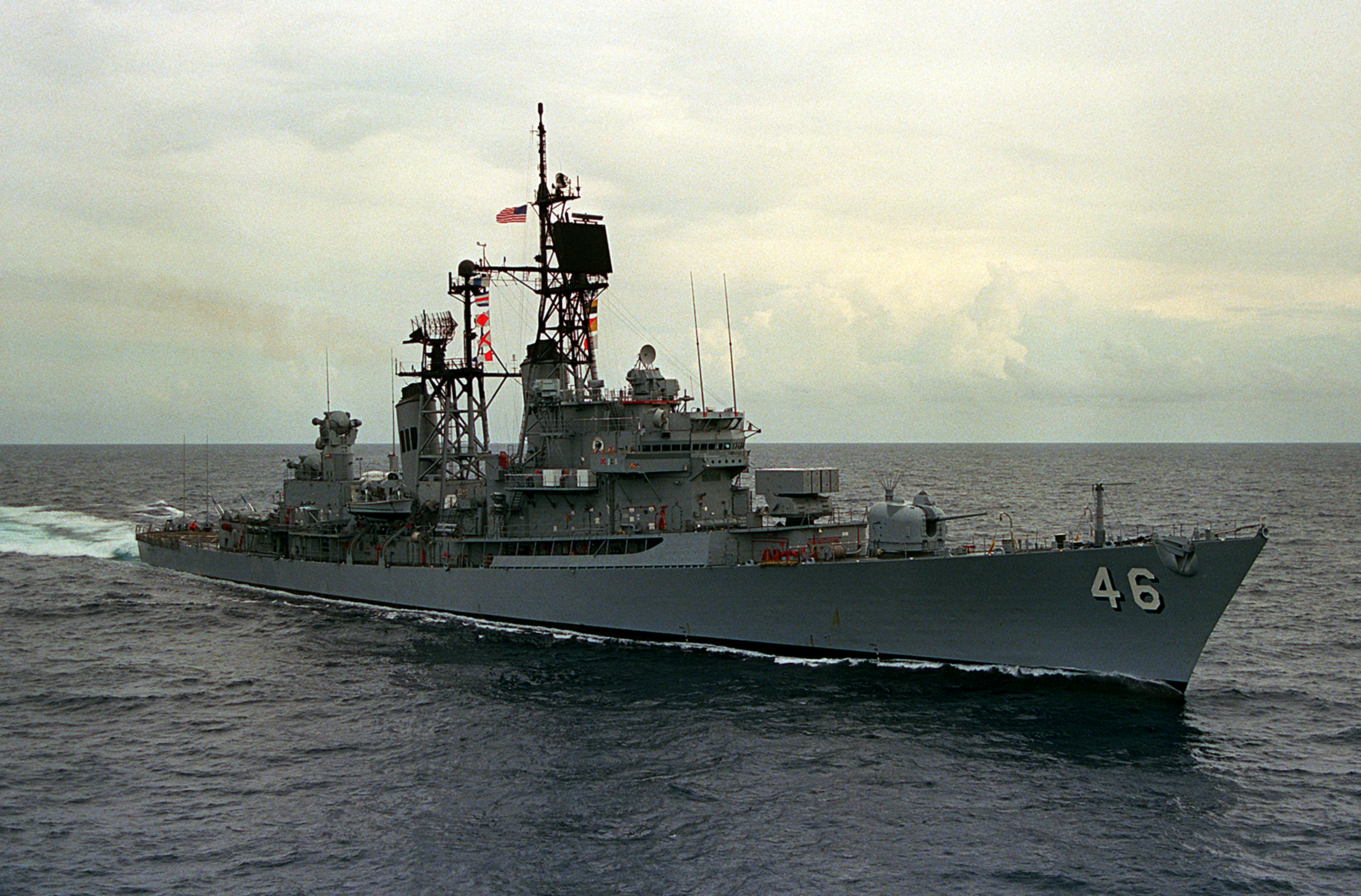
- USS Preble (DDG-46) in 1986

History

United States
- Name: Preble
- Namesake: Edward Preble
- Ordered: 26 October 1956
- Builder: Bath Iron Works
- Laid down: 16 December 1957
- Launched: 23 May 1959
- Acquired: 28 April 1960
- Commissioned: 9 May 1960
- Decommissioned: 15 November 1991
- Stricken: 20 November 1992
- Identification: DDG-46
- Fate: Disposed of by scrapping, dismantling; 10 February 2003

General characteristics
- Class & type: Farragut-class guided missile destroyer
- Displacement: 5,800 tons
- Length: 512.5 ft (156.2 m)
- Beam: 52 ft (16 m)
- Draft: 25 ft (7.6 m)
- Propulsion: 4 x 1200psi boilers; 2 geared turbines
- Speed: 36.5 knots (67.6 km/h; 42.0 mph)
- Range: 4,500 nautical miles (8,300 km; 5,200 mi) at 20 knots (37 km/h; 23 mph)
- Complement: 377 (21 officers + 356 enlisted)
- Sensors & processing systems: AN/SPS-48E air-search radar; AN/SPS-49V1 air-search radar; AN/SPG-55B fire control radar; AN/SPG-53F gun fire control radar; AN/SPS-10C Surface Search Radar; AN/SQQ-23 Pair sonar
- Electronic warfare & decoys: AN/SLQ-32
- Armament: 1 x Mk 42 5 in (130 mm)/54 caliber gun; Mark 46 torpedoes from two Mk-32 triple mounts; 1 x Mk 16 ASROC missile launcher; 1 x Mk 10 Mod.0 missile launcher for RIM-2 Terrier / Standard (ER) Missiles; 2 x Mk 141 Harpoon missile launchers

USS Preble (DLG-15/DDG-46) was a Farragut-class guided missile destroyer in the United States Navy. She was the fifth, of now six ships, named to honor Commodore Edward Preble (1761–1807). Preble was laid down by Bath Iron Works of Bath, Maine on 16 December 1957. She was launched on 23 May 1959, sponsored by Mrs. Ralph E. Wilson. Preble was commissioned at the Boston Naval Shipyard on 9 May 1960. She was decommissioned on 15 November 1991 and struck 20 November 1992 to be scrapped.

== History ==
After shakedown off the eastern coast of the United States, Preble transited the Panama Canal and arrived at San Diego on 2 September 1960. After exercises along the coast of California, she got underway on 27 February 1961 en route to the Far East for a six-month tour with the 7th Fleet. She returned to San Diego on 28 September to rejoin the 1st Fleet. She remained in the eastern Pacific through 1963 and on 26 February 1964 departed California for another tour of duty in the Far East, from 13 March to 20 July.

Rotated regularly to the Western Pacific over the next five years, Preble spent much of her deployed time with the 7th Fleet off the coast of Vietnam. During these tours she served as plane guard for aircraft carriers in the Tonkin Gulf, patrolled on Search and Rescue, and bombarded enemy positions along the coast. On 19 June 1968 Navy Lt.jg. Clyde Everett Lassen and his crew from Helicopter Squadron 7, embarked aboard Preble, flew a hazardous mission deep into North Vietnam to rescue two downed U.S. Navy pilots. Lassen was awarded the Medal of Honor for his actions.

Returning from the Western Pacific in July 1968, Preble operated briefly along the California coast. In December she got underway for the Philadelphia Naval Shipyard for an extensive overhaul. She was decommissioned on 31 January 1969, recommissioned 23 May 1970, and returned to the Pacific Fleet.

On 24 January 1973, the 7th Fleet reported that Preble's torpedo tubes and three antennae were damaged by North Vietnamese artillery while the ship was operating off Quảng Trị Province just below the Vietnamese Demilitarized Zone.

In June 1987, Preble deployed with the Saratoga Battle Group to the Mediterranean Sea and the Black Sea, returning in November 1987. Preble was awarded DESRON TWO's Battle Efficiency "E" for competition that ended in March 1988. "E's" were awarded in Engineering, Damage Control, ASW, Electronic Warfare, Seamanship, Navigation, and Communications.

On 14 January 1989, Preble left Norfolk, Virginia, on a deployment with the Standing Naval Force Atlantic and for the next months she operated Northern Atlantic before returning home on 14 July 1989.

Preble and her crew deployed for Operation Desert Shield/Storm in 1990 returning to Norfolk in 1991.

Decommissioned on 15 November 1991 and stricken from the Naval Vessel Register on 20 November 1992, ex-Preble was transferred to the James River Reserve Fleet on 30 June 1993. The ship was sold for scrap to J&L Metals of Wilmington, North Carolina on 15 April 1994. Repossessed from the scrap yard and resold on 10 February 1999 to International Shipbreakers of Brownsville, Texas for $85,000, the vessel was repossessed for a second time on 10 July 2000 after the scrap yard failed to take delivery of the ship in a timely manner. A contract to dismantle the vessel was issued on 20 March 2002 to Metro Machine of Philadelphia, Pennsylvania for $3,400,000. Preble was completely dismantled by 10 February 2003.
