= Clyde Everett Lassen =

United States Navy Medal of Honor recipient

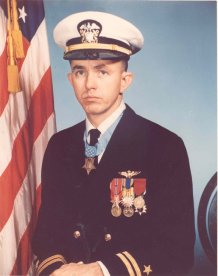
- Born: March 14, 1942; Fort Myers, Florida, US
- Died: April 1, 1994 (aged 52); Pensacola, Florida, US
- Burial place: Barrancas National Cemetery, Pensacola, Florida
- Military career
- Allegiance: United States of America
- Branch: United States Navy
- Service years: 1961–1982
- Rank: Commander
- Units: Helicopter Support Squadron 7, Detachment 104, USS Preble (DLG-15)
- Conflicts: Vietnam War
- Awards: Medal of Honor

Clyde Everett Lassen (March 14, 1942 – April 1, 1994), a native of Fort Myers, Florida, was a Commander in the United States Navy and a Naval Aviator. He initially served over four years as an enlisted sailor, enlisting in September 1961 and eventually achieving the rate of Aviation Electronics Technician 3rd Class (AT3) prior to being selected as a Naval Aviation Cadet (NAVCAD). Upon completion of flight training as a NAVCAD, he received his wings as a Naval Aviator and his commission as an officer in the rank of Ensign.

As a Lieutenant, he was awarded the Medal of Honor for his rescue of two downed Naval Aviators while piloting a search and rescue helicopter in Vietnam.

== The mission ==
On June 19, 1968, Lassen, then a 26-year-old Lieutenant, junior grade flying a UH-2A Seasprite of HC-7 (assigned to the USS Preble), embarked on a mission to recover two downed Naval Aviators (from VF-33, off the USS America) whose F-4J plane had been shot down on a night interdiction mission deep inside North Vietnam. Upon reaching the hilly terrain where the aviators were hiding, Lassen made several attempts to recover the aviators, but dense tree cover, enemy weapons fire and intermittent illumination frustrated his efforts. Lassen turned on the landing lights of the helicopter, despite the danger of revealing his position to the enemy. After the pilots made their way to the helicopter and with his bullet-riddled helicopter dangerously low on fuel, Lassen evaded further antiaircraft fire before landing safely at sea on board the USS Jouett with only five minutes of fuel left in the helicopter's fuel lines. The account of the rescue was logged as a successful, routine search and rescue mission.

LT Lassen became the first Naval Aviator and fifth Navy man to be awarded the Medal of Honor (MOH) for bravery in Southeast Asia (SEA)/Vietnam. He was also only one of four Naval Aviators to be awarded the MOH in SEA (along with CAPT Michael J. Estocin, then-CAPT Stephen W. Pless USMC, and RADM James Stockdale), and the only rotary wing Naval Aviator to be awarded the MOH in SEA.

== Subsequent career ==
He remained in the Navy and in the early 1980s served as Commanding Officer of Helicopter Training Squadron EIGHT (HT-8), an advanced rotary-wing training squadron for USN, USMC, USCG, and NATO/Allied student aviators at Naval Air Station Whiting Field, Florida. He retired in 1982 with the rank of Commander, remaining in Pensacola, Florida until his death from cancer in 1994.

== Other recognitions ==
In 2001, the destroyer USS Lassen was commissioned and named in his honor. An SH-60 Seahawk was painted to commemorate his actions.

In 2010, the Florida Department of Veterans Affairs opened the Clyde E. Lassen State Veterans’ Nursing Home in St. Augustine (St. Johns County), Florida, naming it in CDR Lassen's honor. The 120-bed facility offers skilled nursing care and can accommodate 60 residents with dementia/Alzheimer’s disease.

== Awards and decorations ==
=== Medal of Honor ===
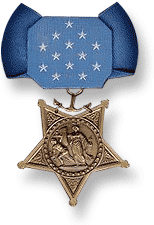

Clyde E. Lassen
Rank and organization: Lieutenant, U.S. Navy, Helicopter Support Squadron 7, Detachment 104, embarked in U.S.S. Preble (DLG-15).
place and date: Republic of Vietnam, June 19, 1968.
Entered service at: Jacksonville, Fla.
Born: March 14, 1942, Fort Myers, Fla.

Citation:

For conspicuous gallantry and intrepidity at the risk of his life above and beyond the call of duty as pilot and aircraft commander of a search and rescue helicopter, attached to Helicopter Support Squadron 7, during operations against enemy forces in North Vietnam. Launched shortly after midnight to attempt the rescue of 2 downed aviators, Lt. (then Lt. (J.G.)) Lassen skillfully piloted his aircraft over unknown and hostile terrain to a steep, tree-covered hill on which the survivors had been located. Although enemy fire was being directed at the helicopter, he initially landed in a clear area near the base of the hill, but, due to the dense undergrowth, the survivors could not reach the helicopter. With the aid of flare illumination, Lt. Lassen successfully accomplished a hover between 2 trees at the survivors' position. Illumination was abruptly lost as the last of the flares were expended, and the helicopter collided with a tree, commencing a sharp descent. Expertly righting his aircraft and maneuvering clear, Lt. Lassen remained in the area, determined to make another rescue attempt, and encouraged the downed aviators while awaiting resumption of flare illumination. After another unsuccessful, illuminated rescue attempt, and with his fuel dangerously low and his aircraft significantly damaged, he launched again and commenced another approach in the face of the continuing enemy opposition. When flare illumination was again lost, Lt. Lassen, fully aware of the dangers in clearly revealing his position to the enemy, turned on his landing lights and completed the landing. On this attempt, the survivors were able to make their way to the helicopter. En route to the coast he encountered and successfully evaded additional hostile antiaircraft fire and, with fuel for only 5 minutes of flight remaining, landed safely aboard USS Jouett (DLG-29).

=== Commendations ===
CDR Lassen's awards include the following:

Badge	United States Navy Aviator Badge		
1st Row	Medal of Honor		Bronze Star with "V" device
2nd Row	Air Medal with Award numeral 1	Navy Presidential Unit Citation	Navy Good Conduct Medal
3rd Row	National Defense Service Medal	Vietnam Service Medal with 1 silver Campaign star (indicating 5 stars total)	Vietnam Campaign Medal with "60-" clasp

== See also ==
- List of Medal of Honor recipients for the Vietnam War
