= USS Lassen (DDG-82) =

Arleigh Burke-class destroyer

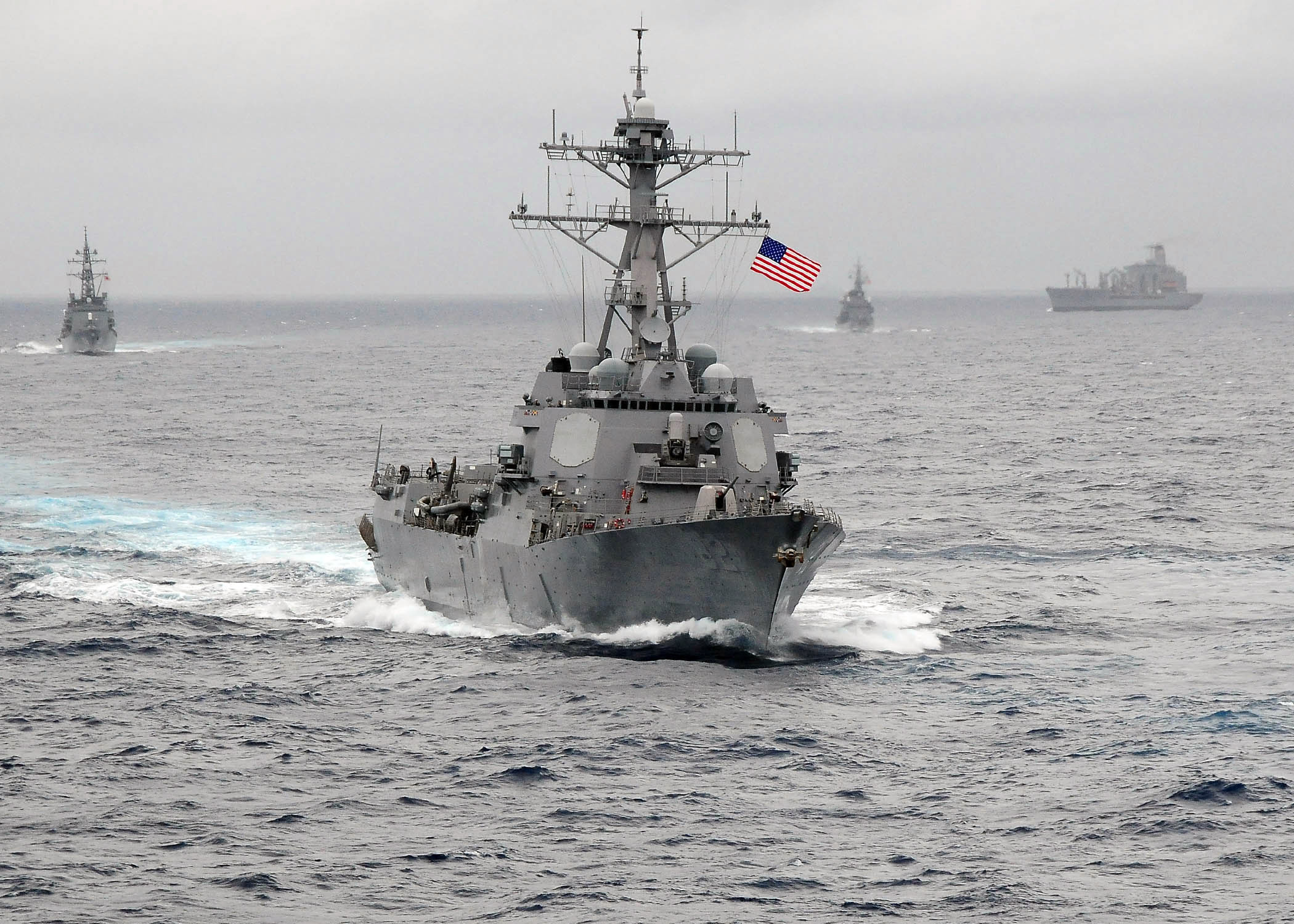
- USS Lassen on 17 November 2009

History

United States
- Name: Lassen
- Namesake: Clyde Everett Lassen
- Ordered: 6 January 1995
- Builder: Ingalls Shipbuilding
- Laid down: 24 August 1998
- Launched: 16 October 1999
- Commissioned: 21 April 2001
- Home port: Mayport
- Identification: MMSI number: 338812000; Callsign: NLSN; Hull number: DDG-82
- Motto: From Courage, Life
- Status: in active service
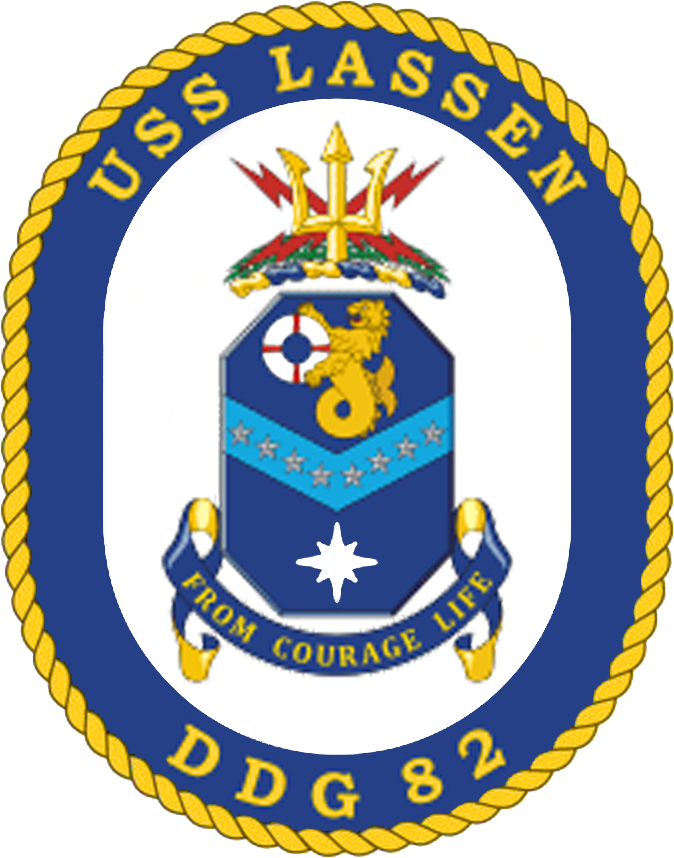
- Badge

General characteristics
- Class & type: Arleigh Burke-class destroyer
- Displacement: 9,200 tons
- Length: 509 ft 6 in (155.30 m)
- Beam: 66 ft (20 m)
- Draft: 31 ft (9.4 m)
- Propulsion: 4 × General Electric LM2500-30 gas turbines, 2 shafts, 100,000 shp (75 MW)
- Speed: exceeds 30 knots (56 km/h; 35 mph)
- Complement: 320 officers and enlisted
- Armament: Guns: 1 × 5-inch (127 mm)/62 mk 45 mod 4 (lightweight gun); 2 × 20 mm (0.8 in) Phalanx CIWS; 2 × 25 mm (0.98 in) Mk 38 machine gun system; 4 × 0.50 inches (12.7 mm) caliber guns; Missiles: 1 × 32-cell, 1 × 64-cell (96 total cells) Mk 41 vertical launching system (VLS): RIM-66M surface-to-air missile; RIM-156 surface-to-air missile; RIM-174A standard ERAM; RIM-161 anti-ballistic missile; RIM-162 ESSM (quad-packed); BGM-109 Tomahawk cruise missile; RUM-139 vertical launch ASROC; Torpedoes: 2 × Mark 32 triple torpedo tubes: Mark 46 lightweight torpedo; Mark 50 lightweight torpedo; Mark 54 lightweight torpedo
- Aircraft carried: 2 × MH-60R Seahawk helicopters

USS Lassen (DDG-82) is an Arleigh Burke-class (Flight IIA) Aegis guided missile destroyer in the United States Navy. She is named for Medal of Honor recipient Commander Clyde Everett Lassen. Lassen was the 14th ship of this class to be built by Ingalls Shipbuilding at Pascagoula, Mississippi, and construction began on 24 August 1998. She was launched and christened on 16 October 1999. On 21 April 2001, she was commissioned at the Florida Aquarium Pier in Tampa, Florida.

== Service history ==
South Korean Navy Mk.99A Super Lynx helicopter on the flight deck for Foal Eagle 2013, in Sea of Japan.

She was homeported in San Diego until she shifted homeport to Yokosuka Naval Base in Yokosuka, Japan in August 2005.

On 15 February 2009 at 12:25 pm, Lassen collided with a Japanese 14-ton pleasure boat in Yokosuka harbor. On 23 March 2009 the Japan Coast Guard filed a case against both the destroyer's and the fishing boat's captains with local prosecutors for professional negligence that endangered traffic.

On 1 July 2009, Fox News Channel reported that Lassen was tracking the North Korean ship Kang Nam 1, suspected of carrying contraband.

On 27 October 2015, Lassen conducted a 72-nautical mile transit through the Spratly Islands in the South China Sea and passed within 12 nautical miles of Subi Reef, one of seven artificial islands built up by China (commonly called the "Great Wall of Sand"), completing one of the most publicized freedom of navigation operations on record. This was the first time since 2012 that the US had directly challenged China's claims in the Spratly Islands.

In January 2016, she moved to Naval Station Mayport in Mayport, Florida. According to the Standard Navy Distribution List, March 2016, at that time she was assigned to the new Naval Surface Squadron 14.

In 2020, in a joint effort with the US Coast Guard, an illegal drug shipment in the Caribbean near Navassa island was found.

In 2023, it was announced the ship would get a 120 million USD modernization.

== Awards ==
- Battle "E" – (2019)
- Arleigh Burke Fleet Trophy - (2019)

== Coat of arms ==
=== Shield ===
The shield has background of blue with a medium blue chevron in the middle. Above the chevron is a sea lion, below is a compass rose.

The traditional Navy colors were chosen for the shield because dark blue and gold represents the sea and excellence respectively. The AEGIS shield displays the ships modern warfare systems. The blue chevron is a symbol of the ships coastal service in the Vietnam War as well as the prow of the ship due to its mission as an ammunition ship. The chevron is also designed like the ribbon of the Medal of Honor awarded to Lieutenant Lassen for his heroism in his rescue of two aviators. The sea lion represents strength and courage which Lieutenant Lassen continuously displayed. The compass rose symbolizes the landing lights of the helicopter which he used to rescue the aviators.

=== Crest ===
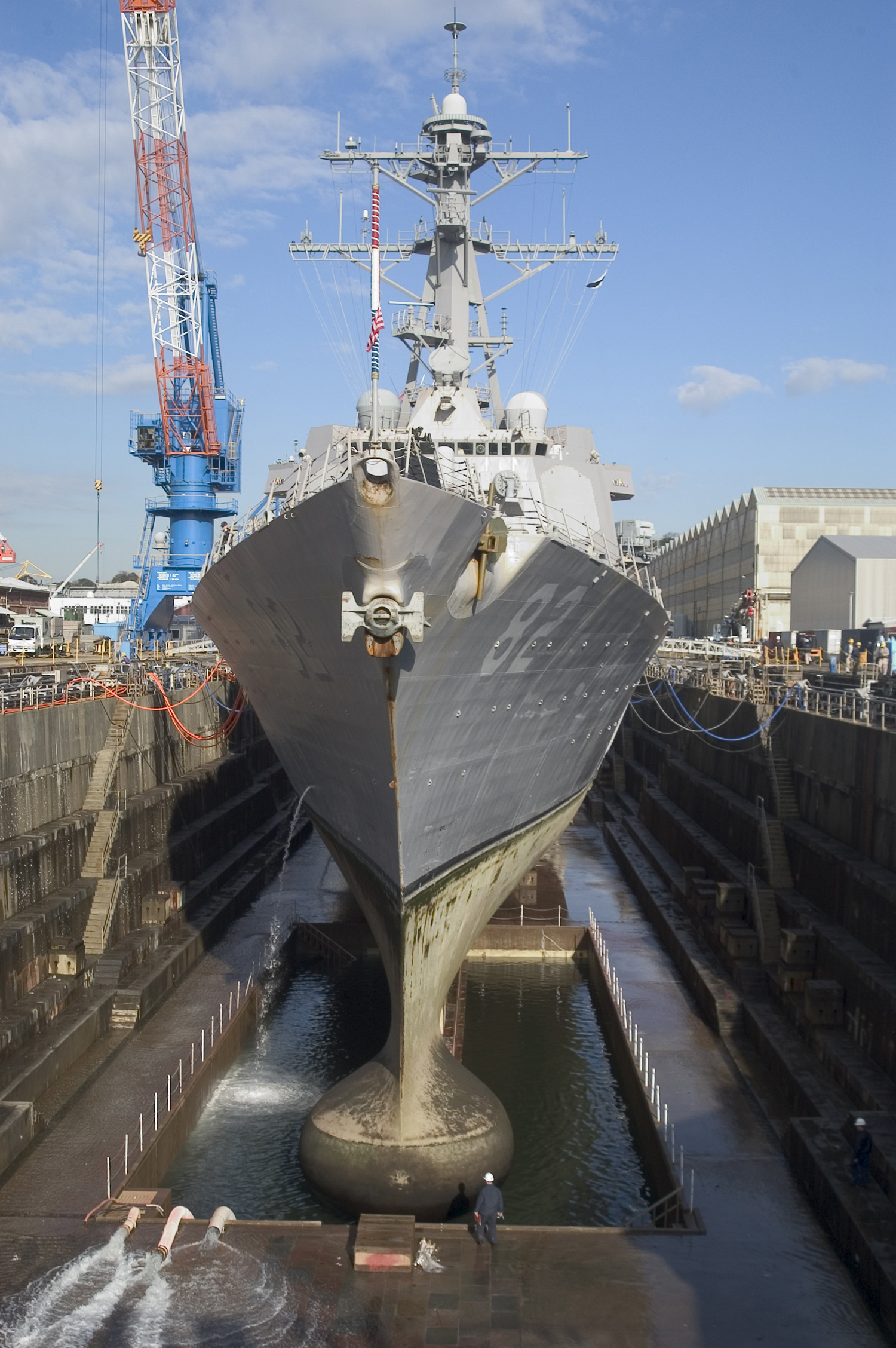
USS Lassen in drydock in Yokosuka, with the sonar dome visible, January 2007

The crest consists of a gold trident surrounded by red lightning bolts over palm fronds.

The trident symbolizes sea prowess while the three tines represent the battle stars earned during World War II in the Pacific while denoting the multi-threat warfare systems of the USS Lassen. The red lightning bolts refer to the strike capability and mission as an ammunition ship, rearming many fleets during war.

=== Motto ===
The motto is written on a scroll of blue that has a gold reverse side.

The ships motto is "From Courage Life". The motto is a reference to both the honorable feats of Lieutenant Lassen and the Medal of Honor he received.

=== Seal ===
The coat of arms in full color as in the blazon, upon a white background enclosed within a dark blue oval border edged on the outside with a gold rope and bearing the inscription "USS Lassen" at the top and "DDG 82" in the base all gold.
