= Maryland Naval Militia =

The Maryland Naval Militia is the authorized but currently inactive organized naval militia of Maryland. It served as a dual federal and state military reserve force, essentially a naval and marine equivalent of the Maryland Army National Guard and the Maryland Air National Guard.

== History ==
The Maryland Naval Militia was first created in 1896 as the Naval Battalion of the military forces of Maryland. In 1895, USS Dale was transferred from the Navy to the Maryland Naval Militia. Members of Maryland's naval militia served in the Spanish–American War; some members were assigned to the Fifth District of the United States Auxiliary Naval Force, while others were deployed aboard USS Dixie.

In 1906, USS Miantonomoh served briefly with Maryland's naval militia until 1907. In 1907, USS Sylvia was transferred to the Maryland Naval Militia where it served the next seven years. USS Somers was loaned to the Maryland Naval Militia in 1909 until its return to federal service in 1914. USS Montgomery was assigned to the naval militia from 1914 until 1918.

During World War I, the members of the Maryland Naval Militia were federalized and deployed aboard USS Missouri.

== Personnel ==
Naval militias are in part regulated and equipped by the federal government, and membership requirements are set according to federal standards. Under 10 U.S. Code § 7854, in order for a state naval militia to be eligible for access to "vessels, material, armament, equipment, and other facilities of the Navy and the Marine Corps available to the Navy Reserve and the Marine Corps Reserve", at least 95% of members of the naval militia must also be members of the United States Navy Reserve or the United States Marine Corps Reserve.

== Legal status ==
Naval militias of U.S. states are recognized by the federal government of the United States as a component of the organized militia under 10 U.S. Code §7851.

Any option for reactivating the Maryland Naval Militia can go either through action by the state government (through the office of the Governor of Maryland) or by legislative action.

== See also ==
- Maryland Defense Force
- Maryland Wing Civil Air Patrol
