= Richard Somers =

Fire Ship 'Intrepid'

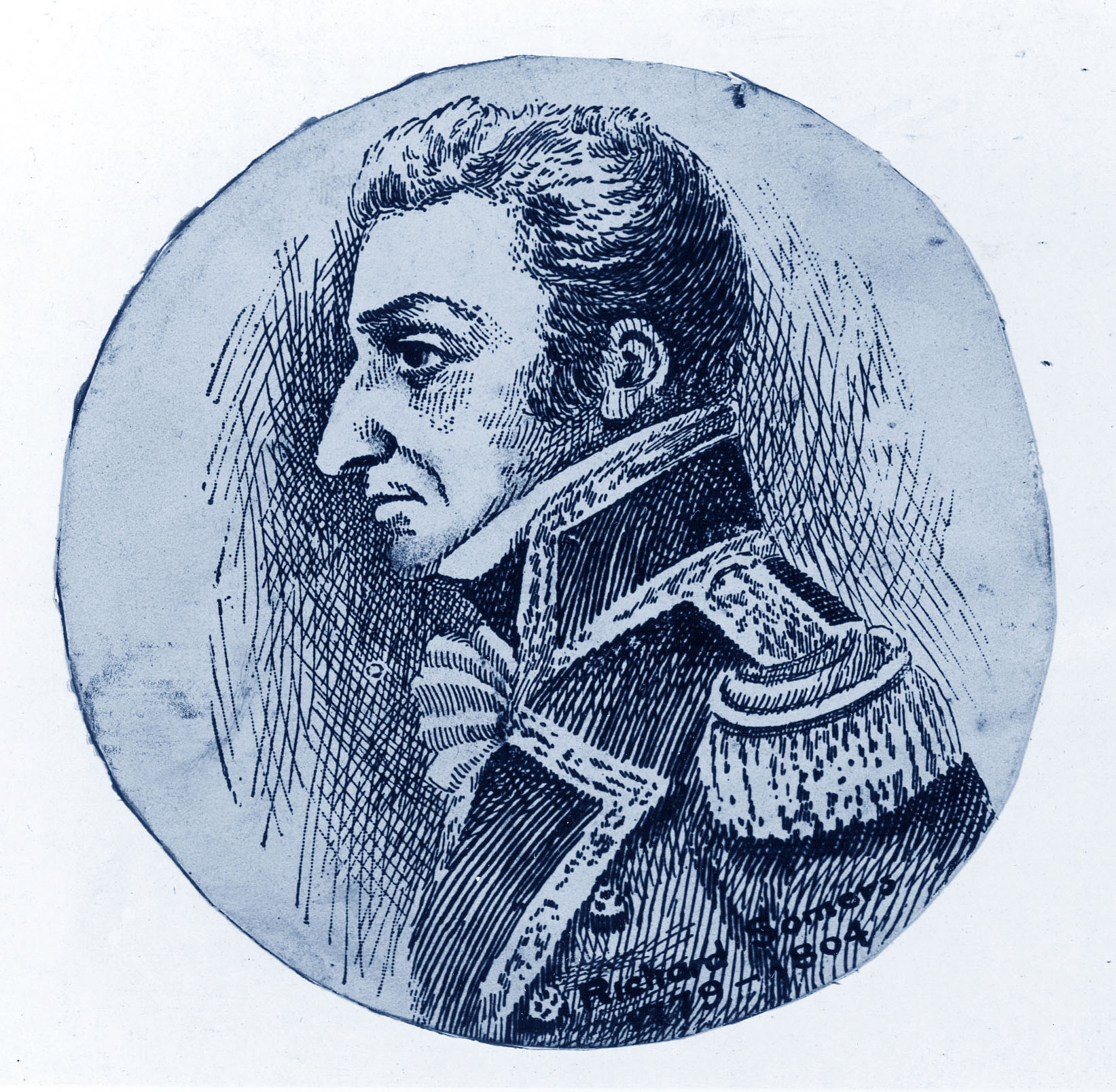
- Born: September 15, 1778; Egg Harbor City, New Jersey
- Died: September 4, 1804 (aged 25) Tripoli, Libya
- Allegiance: United States
- Branch: United States Navy
- Service years: 1797 - 1804
- Rank: Master Commandant
- Conflicts: Quasi-War; First Barbary War; Second Battle of Tripoli Harbor †

Richard Somers (September 15, 1778 – September 4, 1804) was an officer of the United States Navy, killed during an assault on Tripoli during the First Barbary War.

== Early career ==
Born at Great Egg Harbor, New Jersey, he attended the Episcopal Academy in Philadelphia with future naval heroes Stephen Decatur and Charles Stewart. He was appointed midshipman on April 23, 1797, and served in the West Indies during the Quasi-War with France on the frigate United States with Decatur and Stewart, a ship commanded by Captain John Barry. He was promoted to lieutenant on May 21, 1799.

In 1800, Somers fought three duels on the same day with multiple opponents because they accused him of cowardice for failing to challenge Decatur over a joking insult they overheard. Somers was wounded in the first two duels and had to be supported during the third (by Decatur, who was acting as his second).

Somers was detached from United States on June 13, 1801, and ordered to Boston on July 30, 1801. He served in the latter frigate in the Mediterranean. After Boston returned to Washington, DC, Somers was furloughed on November 11, 1802, to await orders.

== First Barbary War ==
On May 5, 1803, Somers was ordered to Baltimore, Maryland, to man, fit out, and command USS Nautilus, and when that schooner was ready for sea, to sail her to the Mediterranean. Nautilus got underway on 30 June, reached Gibraltar on July 27, and sailed four days later to Spain. He then returned to Gibraltar to meet Commodore Edward Preble, in Constitution, who was bringing a new squadron for action against the Barbary pirates. Nautilus sailed with Preble on October 6 to Tangier where the display of American naval strength induced the Europeans of Morocco to renew the treaty of 1786. Thereafter, Tripoli became the focus of Preble's attention.

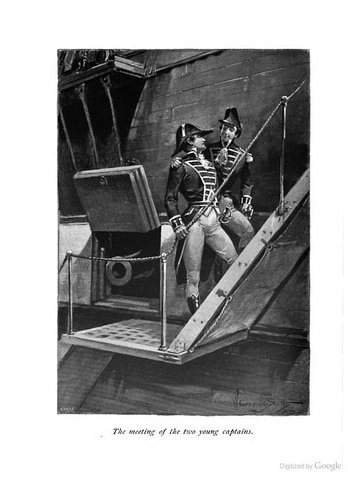
Stephen Decatur and Richard Somers

Somers' service as commanding officer of Nautilus during operations against Tripoli won him promotion to master commandant on May 18, 1804. In the summer, he commanded a division of gunboats amidst five attacks on Tripoli, during the First Barbary War.

On September 4, 1804, Somers assumed command of the fire ship Intrepid, which had been fitted out as a "floating volcano", alongside 12 members of a volunteer crew. Intrepid was to be sailed into Tripoli harbor and blown up in the midst of the corsair fleet close under the walls of the city. That night, she got underway into the harbor, but she exploded prematurely, killing Somers and his entire crew.

== Legacy ==
News of Somers' death would take some months to arrive to the United States, with newspapers in New York and New Jersey reporting on the assault in January 1805. Some reports suggested the premature detonation to be a deliberate act by Somers to avoid capture by approaching sailors, an account which led to Somers' depiction as a martyr within the American Navy. However, the true reasons for the explosion remain unclear and no reliable account is known from the Intrepid's final moments.

Somers is buried in Tripoli, alongside the bodies of other sailors recovered from the explosion. In 2004, the New Jersey State Assembly passed two resolutions calling for the return of his remains. It was hoped that with the fall of Muammar Gaddafi's regime in Libya in August 2011 that the remains might finally be repatriated, but efforts by diplomatic staff and relatives of Somers in the United States remained unsuccessful as of 2015.

Since 1804, six ships of the US Navy have successively been named the USS Somers in his honor.

The town of Somers, New York, located in Westchester County is named in his honor. Somers Point, New Jersey, is named after Richard's great-grandfather. Every year there is a Richard Somers Day celebration in Somers Point.

== See also ==
- Tripoli Monument
