= Second Battle of Tripoli Harbor =

1804 battle of the First Barbary War

- Part of the First Barbary War
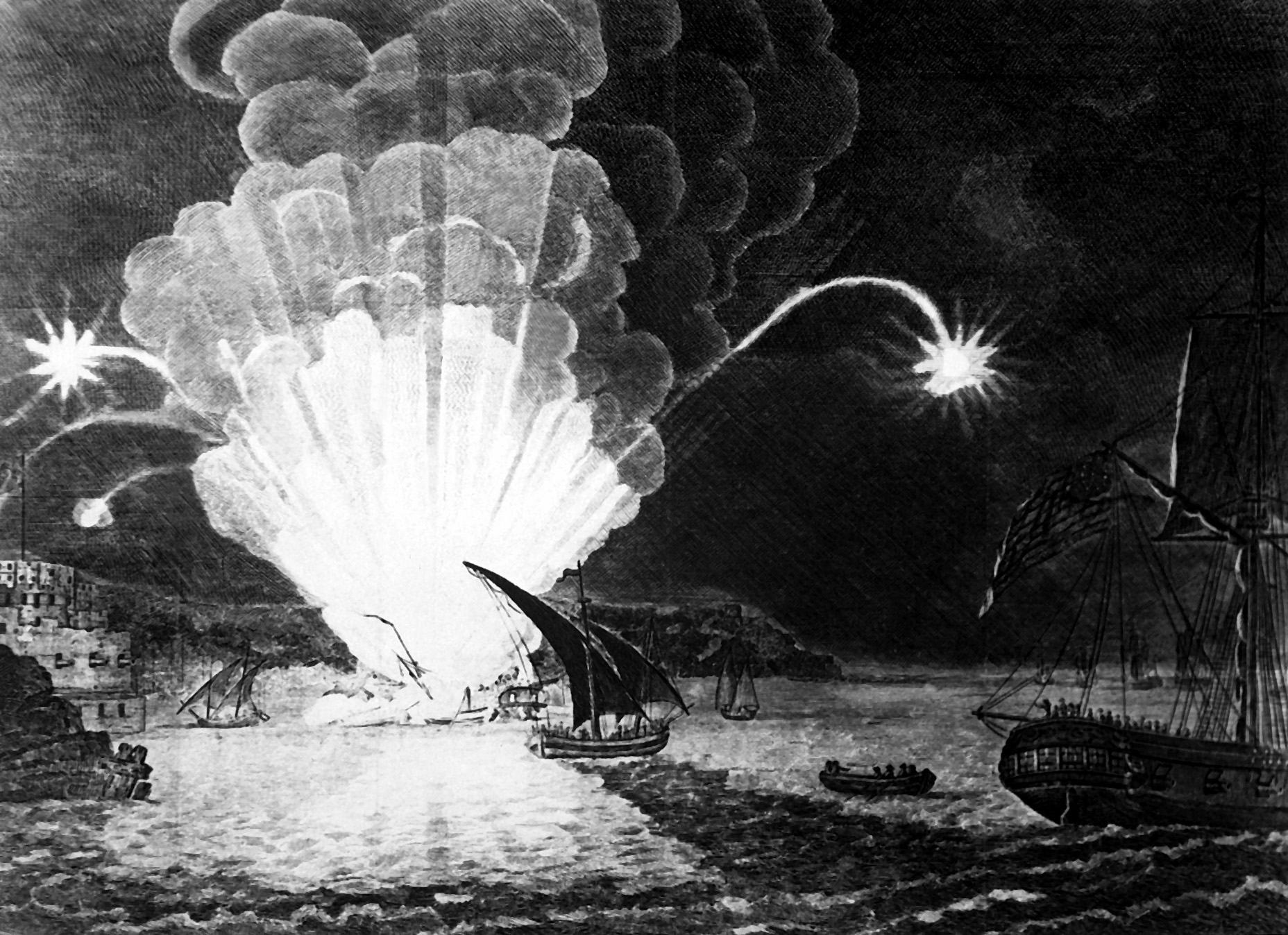
- Destruction of USS Intrepid
Date	3 August – 10 September 1804
Location	Tripoli, Eyalet of Tripolitania 32°54′8″N 13°11′9″E
Result	Tripolitanian victory

Belligerents
Tripolitania	United States; Kingdom of Sicily

Commanders and leaders
Yusuf Karamanli	Edward Preble; Stephen Decatur, Jr. James Decatur †; Richard Somers †

Strength
1 brig 2 schooners 2 galleys 19 gunboats 25,000 men 115 cannons	1 frigate 3 brigs 3 schooners 2 bomb vessels 6 gunboats 1,060 men.

Casualties and losses
47 men killed 27 captured 2 gunboats sunk 3 gunboats captured	30 killed 20 wounded 2 ships destroyed 1 boat sunk

The Second Battle of Tripoli Harbor was a naval action that occurred during the American naval blockade, which took place in Tripoli Harbor between August and September 1804. The battle was part of the First Barbary War between forces of the United States and the forces of the Eyalet of Tripolitania.

== Background ==
Commodore Edward Preble had assumed command of the U.S. Mediterranean Squadron in 1803. By October of that year, Preble had begun a blockade of Tripoli harbor. The first significant action of the blockade came on October 31, when USS Philadelphia ran aground on an uncharted coral reef, and the Tripolitan navy was able to capture the ship along with its crew and Captain William Bainbridge. Philadelphia was turned against the Americans and anchored in the harbor as a gun battery.

On the night of February 16, 1804, a small contingent of U.S. Marines in a captured Tripolitan ketch rechristened USS Intrepid and led by Lieutenant Stephen Decatur, Jr. were able to deceive the guards on board Philadelphia and float close enough to board the captured ship. Decatur's men stormed the vessel and decimated the Tripolitan sailors standing guard. To complete the daring raid, Decatur's party set fire to Philadelphia, denying her use to the enemy. Decatur's bravery in action made him one of the first American military heroes since the Revolutionary War. British Admiral Horatio Nelson, known as a man of action and bravery, is said to have called this "the most bold and daring act of the age."

Following failed attempts in the spring of 1804 to secure a peace treaty with Pasha of Tripoli Yusuf Karamanli, the US commodore, Edward Preble, commanded the third squadron and sailed to Tripoli to force Karamanli to a peace treaty through military means. The US squadron sailed to Naples under the Kingdom of Sicily and granted their pledge for support, providing him with two bomb ketches and six gunboats with 12 crew under each ship. The US squadron arrived off Tripoli on June 12. Preble attempted to negotiate with Karamanli for the ransoming of US prisoners but failed. The Americans resorted to military means, blockading the city.

== Battle ==
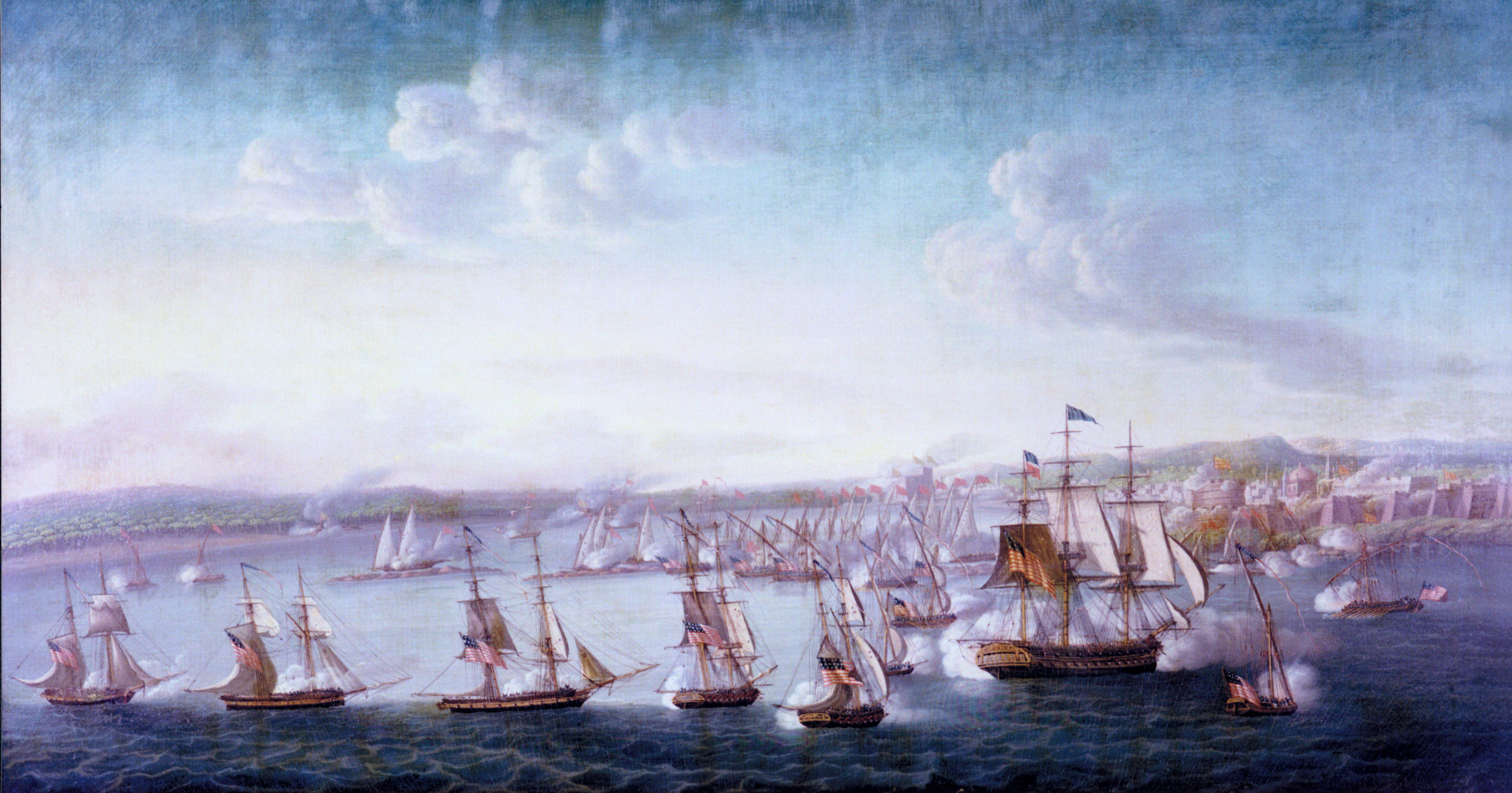
Bombardment of Tripoli, August 3, 1804

The US commander prepared his forces to subdue Tripoli. Preble's forces consisted of one frigate, the Constitution; the brigs Syren, Argus, and Vixen; the schooners Nautilus, Enterprise, and Scourge; two bomb vessels; and six gunboats. The total number of men was 1,060. The Tripolitans had a force of 19 gunboats, two galleys, two schooners, a brig, 25,000 men, and 115 cannons. On August 3, after the winds had calmed down, Preble launched his assault; he dispatched six gunboats to engage the Tripolitan navy, capturing three gunboats and sinking one. Decatur led the attack but lost his brother, James Decatur, who received a fatal shot. The attack cost the Americans one killed and 13 wounded. The Tripolitans suffered 47 killed and 27 captured during the battle.

On August 5, Preble negotiated with Karamanli, offering to pay him $80,000 for the ransom of American captives and, in return, free all the Tripolitan captives. In addition, he would pay $10,000 for the pasha as a "consular present." However, Karmanli was determined to continue the fight and would not have peace unless the Americans have paid $200,000 to $300,000.

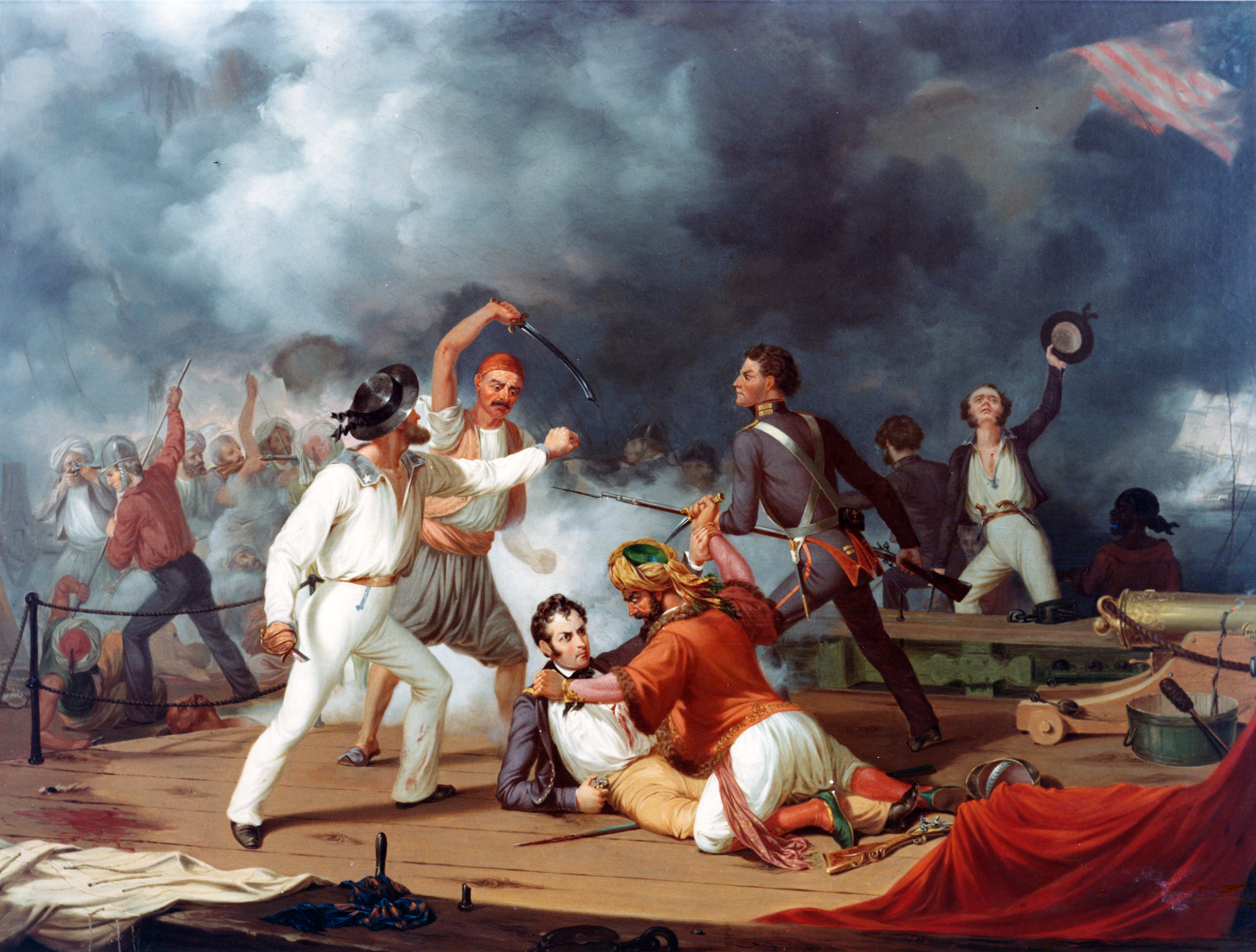
Stephen Decatur's Conflict with the Corsairs at Tripoli, during the boarding of a Tripolitan gunboat on 3 August 1804

On August 7, the winds were favorable again for another attack. At 2:30 PM, his ships were in position to bombard the city. Hours later, the Americans suffered a disastrous setback, where one of the gunboat's powder magazines was hit, causing its destruction and the death of 10 Americans. Additionally, six Americans were wounded. Among the killed were Lieutenant James R. Caldwell and Midshipman John Sword Dorsey. Another gunboat received a shot at the hull, killing 2 Americans. The bombardment continued, and over 500 shells were fired into the city, but since Tripoli was built using mortar, the city did not suffer great damage.

Preble decided to postpone the attack until August 25. During this time, the Tripolitans used the American captives to repair the defenses and damages. The day of the attack began at 3:00 AM, which continued until daylight. Using all of their ammunition, the attack inflicted little damage. On the night of August 28, another attack was launched, in which one Tripolitan gunboat was sunk. An American boat was sunk by a shot, killing three and wounding one. The Americans bombarded the city with over 600 rounds, which almost caused the loss of William Bainbridge's life. Preble decided to resume negotiations: 42 Tripolitan prisoners in exchange for some Americans, but Karamanli once again rejected it and increased his demand for a ransom to $400,000.

This angered Preble, and on September 3, he resumed the attack, damaging several of the batteries but failing to force Karamanli to surrender. Desperate, Preble made a plan to use a ship loaded with explosives in the harbor. Preble used the ship Intrepid for this purpose. Richard Somers volunteered to take the mission. On September 4, at 8:00 AM, the ship began moving to the harbor; the Tripolitans saw this and began firing at it. Intrepid suddenly exploded, killing all of its 13 crew members, most likely caused by Tripolitan fire. One of the men killed was Henry Wadsworth, whose nephew and namesake was poet Henry Wadsworth Longfellow. This setback greatly discouraged Preble, Decatur, and the rest. On September 10, Preble finally called off the attack.

== Aftermath ==
The battle from August to September cost the Americans 30 killed and 20 wounded. Although Preble failed to subdue Karamanli, his efforts earned him praise in the US and Europe. Even Pope Pius VII stated, "The United States, though in their infancy, have done more to humble the anti-Christian barbarians on the African coast than all the European states had done." A monument was built for the fallen officers who died in the battle, including Richard Somers, James Caldwell, James Decatur, Henry Wadsworth, Joseph Israel, and John Dorsey. Preble handed the command of the squadron to his successor, Samuel Barron. The Sicilian gunboats returned home in the end.
