= USS Preble =

USS Preble may refer to the following ships of the United States Navy:

- USS Preble (1813), was a sloop-of-war that fought at the Battle of Lake Champlain in the War of 1812
- USS Preble (1839), was a sloop that fought in the Mexican–American War and the American Civil War, and visited Japan. She was accidentally destroyed by fire in 1863
- USS Preble (DD-12), launched in 1901, was a Bainbridge-class destroyer that served in World War I
- USS Preble (DD-345), launched in 1920, was a Clemson-class destroyer that served in the Pacific campaign of World War II
- USS Preble (DDG-46), launched in 1959; decommissioned 1991, was a Farragut-class guided missile destroyer which saw action in the Vietnam War.
- USS Preble (DDG-88), launched in 2001, is an Arleigh Burke-class destroyer currently in commission
