= USS Somers (DD-301) =

Clemson-class destroyer

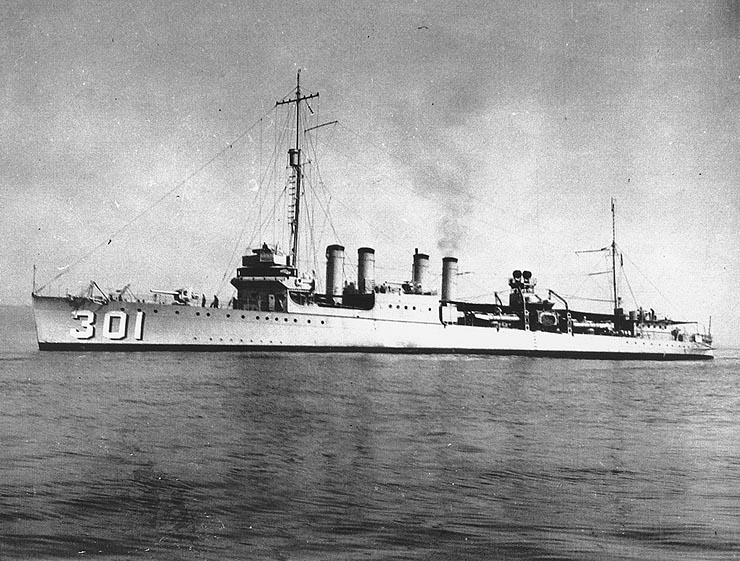
- USS Somers during the 1920s

History

United States
- Name: Somers
- Namesake: Richard Somers
- Builder: Bethlehem Shipbuilding Corporation, Union Iron Works, San Francisco
- Laid down: 4 July 1918
- Launched: 28 December 1918
- Commissioned: 23 June 1920
- Decommissioned: 10 April 1930
- Stricken: 18 November 1930
- Fate: Sold for scrap, 19 March 1931

General characteristics
- Class & type: Clemson-class destroyer
- Displacement: 1,215 tons
- Length: 314 ft 4 1/2 in (95.8 m)
- Beam: 30 ft 11 1/2 in (9.4 m)
- Draft: 9 ft 4 in (2.8 m)
- Propulsion: 4 boilers, 2 Westinghouse geared turbines, 27,600 shp (20,600 kW)
- Speed: 34 knots (63 km/h; 39 mph)
- Range: 4,900 nmi (9,100 km; 5,600 mi) at 15 kn (28 km/h; 17 mph)
- Complement: 122 officers and enlisted
- Armament: 4 × 4 in (102 mm) guns; 1 × 3 in (76 mm) gun; 12 × 21 in (533 mm) torpedo tubes

USS Somers (DD-301), a Clemson-class destroyer, engaged in peacetime operations with the Pacific Fleet from 1920 until she was scrapped under the London Naval Treaty in 1930. She was the fourth ship of the United States Navy named for Richard Somers.

== History ==
Somers was laid down on 4 July 1918 by the Bethlehem Shipbuilding Corporation, San Francisco, California; launched on 28 December 1918; sponsored by Miss Anna Maxwell Jayne; and commissioned on 23 June 1920.

Somers arrived at San Diego, California on 20 July 1920, and five days later sailed for the Puget Sound area and summer exercises with the Battle Fleet. She returned to San Diego on 4 August for war maneuvers off Coronado, California and on 3 October was attached to the Reserve Divisions at San Diego.

Resuming active status in March 1922, Somers underwent overhaul at Puget Sound and returned to San Diego on 8 July for tactical, torpedo, and gunnery exercises. Departing San Diego on 6 February 1923, she operated off Panama with the fleet between 26 February and 11 April, conducting exercises and participating in Fleet Problem I. She then proceeded to Puget Sound for her annual overhaul between 22 April and 28 June.

Somers remained in the north for summer exercises with the Battle Fleet and, on 25 July and 26 July, carried staff officers of President Warren G. Harding from Seattle, Washington to Vancouver, British Columbia, during the president's Alaskan trip.

=== Honda Point disaster and fleet problems ===
On 27 August, she departed Puget Sound with her squadron for San Francisco and San Diego; but in a fog on 8 September, mistakes in navigation caused Somers and eight other ships of the squadron to run aground at Point Honda, in what is known as the Honda Point Disaster. Somers escaped disaster by conducting an emergency turn and, although she grazed a rock, she suffered only moderate damage to her bow. When the fog lifted the next morning, Somers discovered Fuller and Woodbury aground on an offshore rock. Together with a passing fishing vessel, Bueno Amor de Roma, the destroyer rescued survivors. She arrived in San Diego on 10 September and received repairs at Mare Island from 31 October to 5 December.

On 2 January 1924, Somers departed San Diego with the Battle Fleet for the annual fleet concentration, transited the Panama Canal on 18 January, and participated in winter exercises and Fleet Problems II and III in the Caribbean until 31 March. Returning to San Diego in early April, she conducted summer exercises in the Puget Sound area from 2 July to 1 September; and, after a month in San Diego, returned to Puget Sound for overhaul from 25 November 1924 to 17 February 1925. Departing San Diego on 3 April 1925, Somers headed for Hawaii. She participated in Joint Army and Navy Problem 3 en route and arrived at Pearl Harbor with the fleet on 27 April. On 1 July, the Battle Fleet, including Somers, departed Pearl Harbor for a goodwill cruise to the Southwest Pacific and visited Melbourne, Australia; Dunedin and Wellington, New Zealand; and American Samoa, before returning to San Diego on 26 September.

Somers sailed on 1 February 1926 from San Diego for the annual fleet concentration off the Canal Zone which lasted until 20 March. On 14 June, she departed San Diego for summer exercises in the Puget Sound area, returning on 1 September. The annual overhaul at Puget Sound lasted from 7 December 1926 to 19 January 1927; and, on 17 February, she was again underway with the Battle Fleet for the fleet concentration. After completing exercises in the Caribbean on 22 April, the fleet made a visit to New York, conducted a joint Army and Navy exercise in Narragansett Bay, and then arrived at Hampton Roads on 29 May for the Presidential Naval Review there. Departing Hampton Roads on 4 June, the Battle Fleet, including Somers, called at San Diego from 25 June to 1 July and arrived in the Puget Sound area on 16 July for summer exercises.

=== Final missions and fate ===
Somers and her squadron left Puget Sound on 20 August and sailed to Hawaii, searching for planes lost on a flight from the United States to Honolulu. She returned to San Diego on 5 September and underwent overhaul at Puget Sound from 25 December 1927 to 29 February 1928. After a month at San Diego, she sailed on 9 April 1928 with the fleet for Hawaii to conduct Fleet Problem VIII. She returned to San Diego on 23 June and got underway six days later for summer exercises in Puget Sound including a reserve training cruise to Alaska from 7 to 21 July. Returning to San Diego on 4 September, she received repairs at Bremerton, Washington from 31 December 1928 to 8 February 1929; and, after spending the spring at San Diego, operated with the fleet off Puget Sound from 18 June to 28 August. On 25 September 1929 at San Diego, she towed the destroyer Buchanan from the reserve fleet to her buoy.

On 10 April 1930, Somers was decommissioned and Buchanan was commissioned in her place. Somers was struck from the Navy list on 18 November 1930, scrapped at Mare Island in 1930 and 1931, and her materials were sold on 19 March 1931.
