= USS Sylvia (SP-471) =

Patrol vessel of the United States Navy

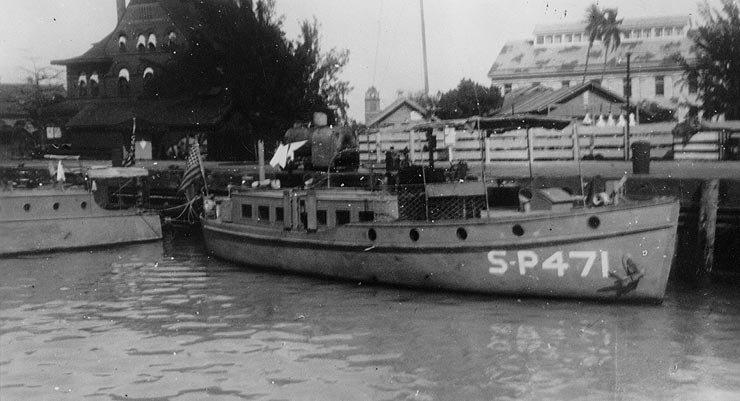
- USS Sylvia (SP-471) during World War I.

History

United States
- Name: USS Sylvia (1917–1918); USS SP-471 (1918–1919)
- Namesake: Sylvia was her previous name retained; SP-471 was her section patrol number
- Builder: Sam Williams, Marco, Florida
- Acquired: 6 June 1917
- Commissioned: 4 September 1917
- Renamed: SP-471 11 April 1918
- Stricken: 24 April 1919 or 4 October 1919
- Fate: Wrecked 9 September 1919
- Notes: Operated as private motorboat Sylvia until June 1917

General characteristics
- Type: Patrol vessel
- Tonnage: 17 gross register tons
- Length: 48 ft 6 in (14.78 m)
- Beam: 11 ft 6 in (3.51 m)
- Draft: 3 ft 1 in (0.94 m)
- Speed: 6.9 knots
- Complement: 8
- Armament: 1 × 1-pounder gun; 1 × machine gun

The second USS Sylvia (SP-471), later USS SP-471, was a United States Navy patrol vessel in commission from 1917 to 1919.

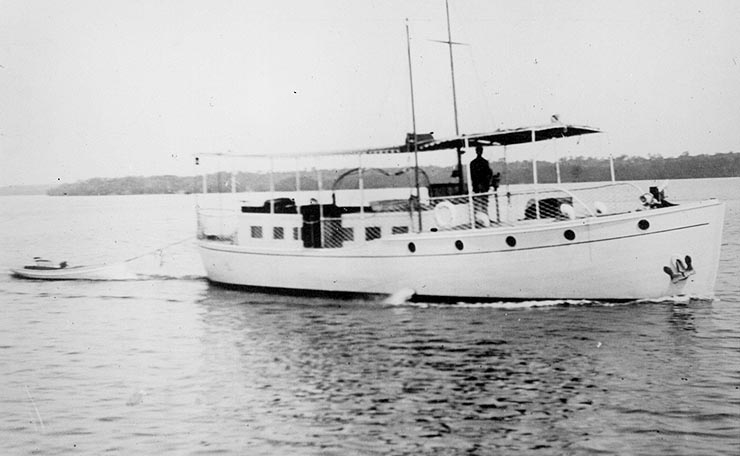
Sylvia as a private motorboat prior to her U.S. Navy service.

Sylvia was built as a private motorboat of the same name by Sam Williams at Marco, Florida. On 6 June 1917, the U.S. Navy acquired her from her owner, J. Alwood of Winter Haven, Florida, for use as a section patrol vessel during World War I. She was commissioned as USS Sylvia (SP-471) on 4 September 1917.

Assigned to the 7th Naval District, Sylvia operated on patrol duty in Florida waters for the rest of World War I and into early 1919. On 11 April 1918 her name was changed to USS SP-471 to avoid confusion with the first USS Sylvia, a patrol yacht which also was in commission at the time.

SP-471 was out of commission and awaiting sale when she became one of eight section patrol boats destroyed at North Beach Basin at Key West, Florida, on 9 September 1919 by the 1919 Florida Keys Hurricane. Anchored in the basin when the hurricane struck, she was beaten to pieces against the basin's wall and completely wrecked.

Sources vary as to when SP-471 was stricken from the Navy List. It may have occurred on 24 April 1919 in advance of her being put up for sale or on 4 October 1919 after her destruction.
