= USS Sylvia (1882) =

Ship

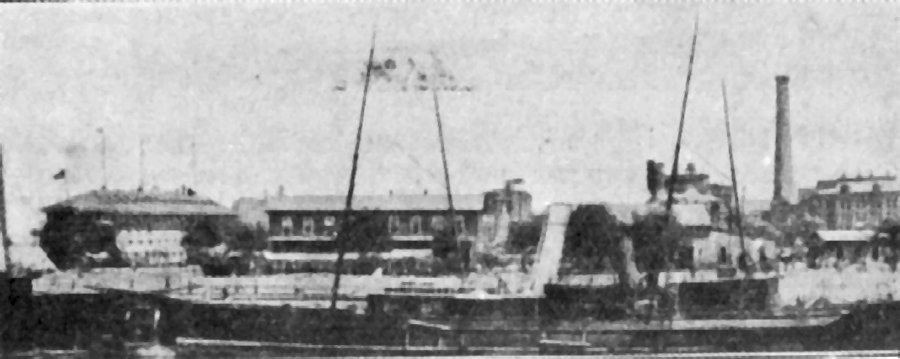
- USS Sylvia sometime during her 1907-1913 period of non-commissioned service with the Pennsylvania Naval Militia.

History

United States
- Name: USS Sylvia
- Namesake: Previous name retained
- Builder: A. Stephen and Sons, Glasgow, Scotland, United Kingdom
- Completed: 1882
- Acquired: 13 June 1898
- Commissioned: 29 June 1898
- Decommissioned: 10 December 1898
- Recommissioned: 10 April 1917
- Stricken: 24 April 1919
- Fate: Sold 20 October 1921
- Notes: Operated as private yacht Sylvia 1882–1898; In non-commissioned service with Maryland Naval Militia 1898–1907; In non-commissioned service with Pennsylvania Naval Militia 1907–1913; In non-commissioned service with District of Columbia Naval Militia 1913–1917

General characteristics
- Type: Patrol vessel
- Tonnage: 302 tons
- Length: 130 ft (40 m) waterline
- Beam: 18 ft 6 in (5.64 m)
- Draft: 10 ft (3.0 m)
- Propulsion: Steam: two Roberts boilers, one vertical compound engine, one shaft
- Speed: 9 knots
- Complement: 35
- Armament: 1 × rifled 3-pounder gun; 3 × 1-pounder rifled guns; 2 × machine guns

The first USS Sylvia was a United States Navy patrol vessel in commission in 1898 and from 1917 to 1919. She saw service in both the Spanish–American War and World War I.

== Construction and acquisition ==
Sylvia was built as a private steam yacht of the same name in 1882 in the United Kingdom by A. Stephen and Sons at Glasgow, Scotland. On 13 June 1898, the U.S. Navy purchased her for use as a patrol yacht during the Spanish–American War.

== Spanish–American War operations ==
Sylvia was commissioned as USS Sylvia on 29 June 1898. She departed New York City on 21 July 1898 bound for Norfolk, Virginia, then proceeded from Norfolk to Key West, Florida, where she arrived on 13 August 1898, the day after the war ended. On 17 August 1898 she departed Key West to return to Norfolk, arriving there on 25 August 1898. She was decommissioned at the Norfolk Navy Yard at Portsmouth, Virginia, on 10 December 1898.

== Naval Militia service ==
For over 19 years, Sylvia was in non-commissioned service with state naval militias. She was transferred to the Maryland Naval Militia on 19 December 1898, beginning a nine-year tour of dutry there. On 6 December 1907, she was reassigned to the Pennsylvania Naval Militia and remained with that organization for over five-and-a-half years. On 13 September 1913, she was reassigned to the District of Columbia Naval Militia, with which she operated for over three-and-a-half years.

== World War I service ==
On 10 April 1917, the U.S. Navy recommissioned Sylvia for use as a section patrol vessel during World War I. Assigned to the 5th Naval District, she operated on patrol duty in the Hampton Roads, Virginia, area for the remainder of the war. During this period, she should not be confused with the second USS Sylvia (SP-471), a patrol vessel in commission at the same time.

== Disposal ==
Sylvia was decommissioned again after World War I. She was stricken from the Navy List on 24 April 1919 and sold on 20 October 1921.
