= Master commandant =

Former rank in the US Navy

Master commandant was a rank within the early United States Navy. Both the Continental Navy (started in 1775) and the United States Navy (created by the United States Congress in 1796) had just two commissioned ranks, lieutenant and captain. Master commandant, who would command smaller vessels, was used unofficially as early as 1799.

== History ==
The rank was made official in 1806 and was changed to "commander" in 1837.

The early US Navy had three "grades" of officer who were typically placed in charge of warships: captain; master commandant; and lieutenant, commanding (which was not a distinct rank but a title given to an ordinary lieutenant). That structure remains largely in place in the modern US Navy, with the distinct ranks of captain, commander, and lieutenant commander. Master commandant was roughly equivalent to the Royal Navy rank of master and commander, which was shortened to "commander" in 1794. When he was in command of a ship, such as a sloop or brig, a master commandant would be addressed as "captain" by the sailors on board.

Contemporary paintings show the main difference of a master commandant's uniform from a captain's uniform was that while a captain wore an epaulet on each shoulder a master commandant had a single epaulet on the right shoulder, and a lieutenant commandant wore a single epaulet on the left shoulder.

In 1825 a master commandant was paid $60 per month, while a captain of a ship with 20–32 cannons was paid $75 per month. A lieutenant commandant was paid $50 per month, while a lieutenant or a sailing master earned $40 per month. Midshipmen earned $19 per month. Captains of ships with more than 32 cannons earned $100 per month.

== Notable officers ==
American naval officer Stephen Decatur notably never held the rank of master commandant. After leading a raid to destroy the captured U.S. frigate Philadelphia in Tripoli Harbor in 1804, Decatur returned to the U.S. as a national hero and was given a direct promotion from lieutenant to captain. Also in 1804, Master Commandant Richard Somers led a dozen volunteer sailors on USS Intrepid—loaded with explosives—toward the pirate fleet in the harbor of Tripoli during the First Barbary War.
