= Edward Preble =

American naval officer (1761–1807)

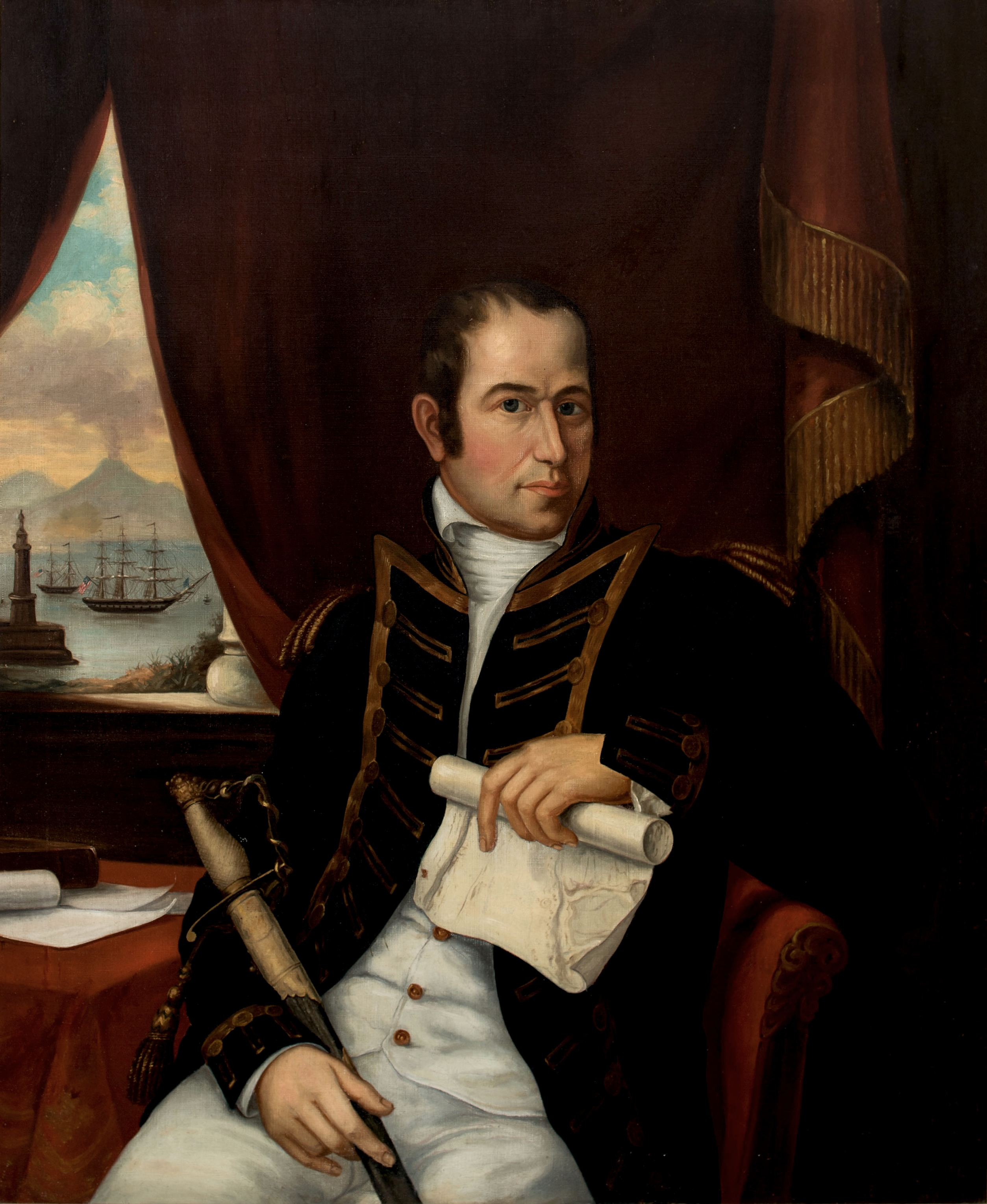
- Portrait, c. 1807
- Born: August 15, 1761; Falmouth, Massachusetts, British America
- Died: August 25, 1807 (aged 46); Portland, Massachusetts, U.S.
- Spouse: Mary Deering
- Military career
- Allegiance: United States
- Branch: Massachusetts State Navy; United States Navy
- Service years: 1778–1804
- Rank: Commodore
- Commands: USS Pickering; USS Essex; USS Constitution
- Conflicts: American Revolutionary War; Quasi War; First Barbary War; Second Battle of Tripoli Harbor
- Awards: Congressional Gold Medal

Commodore Edward Preble (August 15, 1761 – August 25, 1807) was an American naval officer who served in the American Revolutionary War and the First Barbary War, leading attacks on Tripoli and forming the officer corps that would go on to command the United States Navy during the War of 1812.

== Early life ==
Preble's coat of arms

Edward Preble was born on August 15, 1761 in Falmouth, Massachusetts. He was the son of Jedidiah Preble and his second wife, Mehitable Roberts Preble. Preble was educated in Falmouth before attending the Dummer School in Byfield, Massachusetts. In 1775, the American Revolutionary War broke out, and Preble's elder brothers went off to serve in the conflict on the Patriot side. As a result, the responsibility of managing Jedidiah's farming interests fell to Preble, "a job he did not like".

== Revolutionary War service ==
In 1778, Preble joined the privateer Hope as a common sailor after becoming discontented with farming. However, he quickly switched ships to serve on board the West Indiaman Merrimack. In 1780, Preble was appointed as an acting midshipman on board the Massachusetts State Navy frigate Protector "thanks in large part to his father's influence". The frigate spent most of the year cruising off New England and the West Indies; on May 26, 1780, Protector sunk the British merchantman Admiral Duff and captured 55 survivors, who infected Preble and his crewmates with fever. When the frigate reached Boston on August 15, Preble remained on land to recover.

In December 1780, Preble joined the crew of Protector as it set out on another commerce raiding expedition. The frigate set out for Nova Scotia before heading south towards the West Indies. Five months later in May 1781, Protector encountered the British frigates Roebuck and Medea, who captured her. Preble was taken prisoner and sent to the prison hulk HMS Jersey in New York. After discovering Preble's capture, Jedidiah contacted a well-known Loyalist living in New York and asked him to intervene on Preble's behalf. On July 24, Preble was exchanged for a captive British officer, returning to Boston two days later and remaining there until 1782. He subsequently joined the Massachusetts States Navy warship Winthrop, serving on her until the end of the war. During his time onboard Winthrop, Preble led a boarding party which captured a British brig near Penobscot Bay. In 1783, the Treaty of Paris was signed, bringing the conflict to an end.

== United States Navy service ==
Fifteen years of merchant service followed his Revolutionary War career and, in April 1798, he was commissioned as a lieutenant in the United States Navy. In January 1799, he assumed command of the 14-gun brig USS Pickering and took her to the West Indies to protect American commerce during the Quasi-War with France. Commissioned as a captain in June 1799, he took command of the 32-gun frigate USS Essex in December and sailed from Newport, Rhode Island in January 1800 for the Dutch East Indies via the Indian Ocean to convoy home a group of East Indiamen.

Upon his return, Preble announced to the Secretary of the Navy that he intended to retire from the Navy due to his health. Not wanting to lose such an experienced and capable officer, the secretary decided to put Preble on indefinite sick leave until a good post could be found for him.

On 12 January 1802 he was ordered to take command of USS Adams at New York in a letter from the Navy Secretary. In a letter dated 13 April 1802 Preble asked for a furlough due to a rapid decline in his health since arriving in New York in January. His request was granted in a letter dated 16 April.

During this time, the United States was engaged in naval warfare with the city-state of Tripoli, whose corsairs were causing havoc amongst American merchantmen in the Mediterranean. The U.S. Navy had sent squadrons under two commanders, Richard Dale and Richard Valentine Morris, to protect American interests in the region. While Dale ran an effective blockade of Tripoli, the endless routine bored his officers. Upon his return, Dale left the Navy over a promotion dispute. The tenure of Richard Valentine Morris, on the other hand, was an utter fiasco, as Morris was neither an effective commander nor a very smart one. Morris spent most of his time socializing in Gibraltar and Malta, and he managed to be taken hostage by the Bey of Tunis, who felt that the American did not give him an adequate farewell (the ransom was paid by the American and Danish consuls). When he finally did arrive at Tripoli, he tried to play diplomat and sue for peace, which destabilized the strong negotiating position the Americans had been building up to that point. When Morris returned home, he was stripped of his commission by President Thomas Jefferson without so much as a court-martial.

With Morris ordered home, Jefferson needed a new officer to command the Mediterranean Squadron. Bypassing several senior officers, Preble, who was in Boston supervising the construction of a new brig for the navy was ordered in a letter dated 14 May 1803 to take command also of, and ready, USS Constitution for duty in the Mediterranean. He accepted in a letter dated 19 May, and was given a promotion to commodore along with his new ship. Preble set sail for the Mediterranean on August 14, 1803.

=== First Barbary War ===
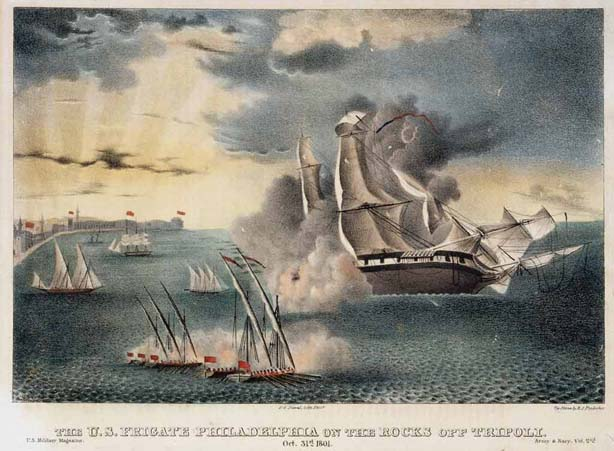
USS Philadelphia aground off Tripoli in 1803

Preble's squadron arrived off Cádiz on September 10. After signing a peace treaty with Morocco, Preble established a blockade off Tripoli. Stephen Decatur, William Bainbridge, Charles Stewart, Isaac Hull, Thomas Macdonough, James Lawrence, and David Porter served under his command at Tripoli. While commanding in Tripoli, Preble masterminded the burning of USS Philadelphia by Lieutenant Stephen Decatur on February 16, 1804, preventing the captured frigate from falling into enemy hands. Had Tripoli gained the use of Philadelphia, the entire blockade would have been wasted. Stephen Decatur and his younger brother, James Decatur, led the actual operation. James Decatur was killed in the Second Battle of Tripoli Harbor later that year aboard one of the squadron's attack craft.

EDWARDO PREBLE DUCI STRENUO COMITIA AMERICANA. (The American Congress to Edward Preble, a valiant officer.)

Reverse of Congressional Medal. VINDICI COMMERCII AMERICANI. (To the vindicator of American commerce.) Exergue: ANTE TRIPOLI MDCCCIV. (Off Tripoli, 1804). Representing the bombardment, by the American fleet in the foreground, of the forts and town of Tripoli in the background. The American vessels are drawn up in line, and several boats manned are seen in the water casting off to the attack of the enemy's shipping and batteries.

Over the course of his career, Preble helped establish many of the modern Navy's rules and regulations. Described as a stern taskmaster, he kept high discipline upon the ships under his command. He also dictated that his ships be kept in a state of readiness for any action while under sail, something many US naval officers at the time did not insist upon. Future sea captains such as Decatur, Lawrence, and Porter took his procedures to heart at a time when the US Navy was highly unregulated. Many of Preble's procedures became doctrine after the establishment of an official US Navy. The officers serving under him during his career also went on to become influential in the Navy Department after his death, and together they proudly wore the unofficial title of "Preble's Boys". (When Preble took over command he discovered that his oldest officer was 30 and the youngest 15 years old. He therefore grumbled the Secretary of the Navy had given him "just a pack of schoolboys".)

Preble's Mediterranean cruise led directly to the US government's firm anti-negotiation stance. Many Mediterranean states, including Tripoli, had been pirating American shipping vessels, ransoming the sailors, and demanding tribute to prevent future pirate attacks. The tribute rose after each successful payment, as did the brutality and boldness of the attacks.

== Later career ==
In September 1804, Commodore Preble requested relief due to a longtime illness. He returned to the United States in February 1805 and became engaged in the comparably light duty of shipbuilding activities at Portland, Maine. By congressional resolution in March 1805, a gold medal was struck and presented to Commodore Preble for the "gallantry and good conduct" of himself and his squadron at Tripoli. President Jefferson offered him the Navy Department in 1806, but Preble declined appointment due to his poor health.

Preble died in Portland of a gastrointestinal illness on August 25, 1807. He is buried in Eastern Cemetery in Portland, Maine.

== Personal life ==
On March 17, 1801, Preble was married to Mary Deering (1770–1851) in Portland, Maine. Mary was a daughter of Nathaniel Deering and Dorcas (née Milk) Deering. Together, they were the parents of one child:

- Edward Deering Preble (1806–1846), who married Sophia Elizabeth Wattles (1813–1889) in 1833.

Preble's widow and son lived in a mansion which stood at the corner of today's Congress Street and Preble Street between 1808 and 1860. It was demolished and replaced firstly by Preble House, then by the Chapman Building in 1924.

== Legacy ==
- Six ships of the United States Navy named USS Preble
- Preble Hall, the museum at the United States Naval Academy
- Preble County in Ohio
- Fort Preble at Spring Point in South Portland, Maine
- Preble House in Portland, Maine
- Preble Street in Portland, Maine
- Preble Street in South Portland, Maine
- Preble Street in Bremerton, Washington
- Preble Ave. in Norman, Oklahoma
- Preble Township, Minnesota
- Town of Preble, Cortland County, NY
- Preble, Wisconsin, a former town in Wisconsin, now part of the city of Green Bay
- Preble High School in Green Bay, Wisconsin
- Preble Township, Town of Preble, IN
- Preple Hall, Training Support Center Great Lakes, IL

== In popular culture ==
- Preble appears as a character in the science fiction novel Time for Patriots, ISBN 978-1-60693-224-7, performing much as he did historically.
- In the 1926 silent film Old Ironsides, Preble was portrayed by actor Charles Hill Mailes.
- Preble appears as a character in the James L. Haley historical fiction novel "The Shores of Tripoli", ISBN 978-0-425-27817-8.
- Preble appears In "With Preble at Tripoli : a story of "Old Ironsides" and the Tripolitan war" Pub 1900, Author: James Otis, Publisher: Boston; Chicago : W.A. Wilde Co. Youth Fiction (WorldCat)
- The Constitution under Preble's command makes a very brief appearance in C. S. Forester's novel Hornblower and the Hotspur.
