= List of ships captured in the 19th century =

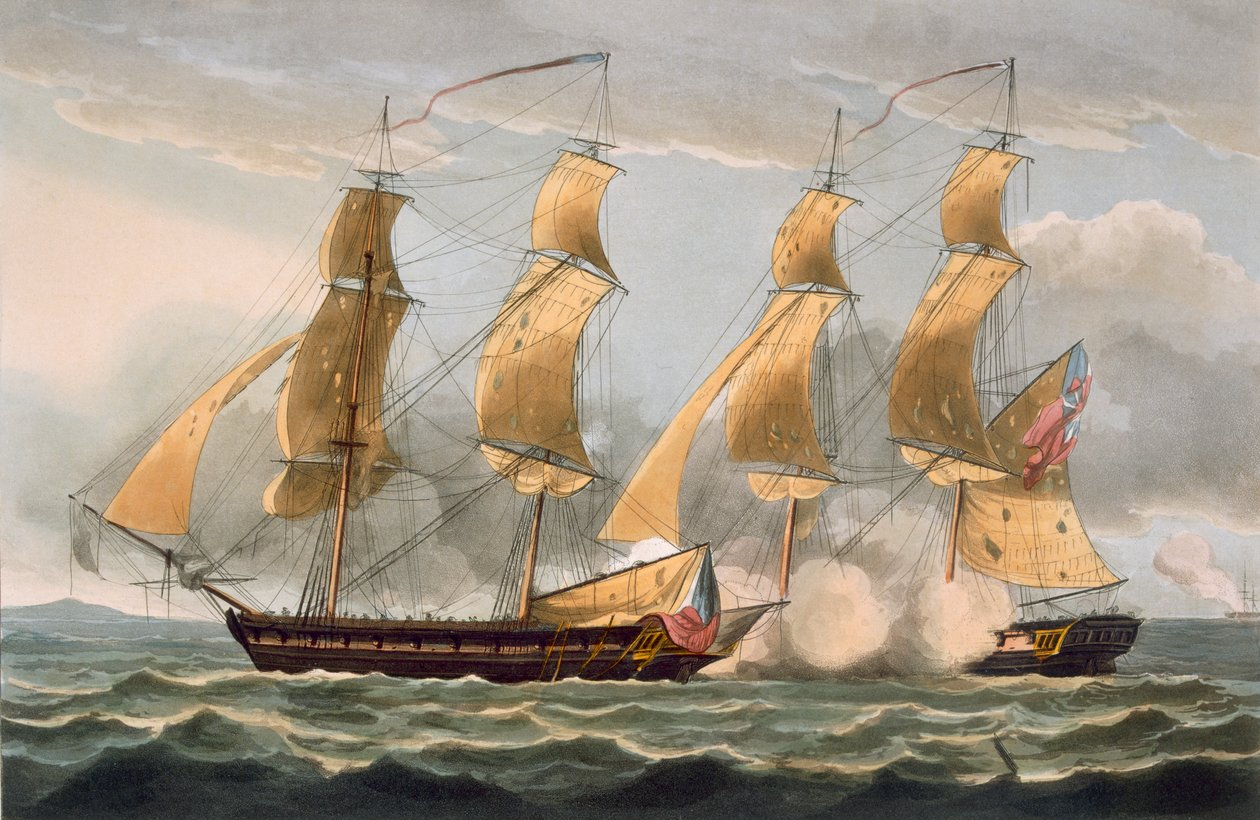
USS Argus (left) being captured by HMS Pelican on 14 August 1813

Throughout naval history during times of war, battles, blockades, and other patrol missions would often result in the capture of enemy ships or those of a neutral country. If a ship proved to be a valuable prize, efforts would sometimes be made to capture the vessel and to inflict the least amount of damage that was practically possible. Both military and merchant ships were captured, often renamed, and then used in the service of the capturing country's navy or in many cases sold to private individuals, who would break them up for salvage or use them as merchant vessels, whaling ships, slave ships, or the like. As an incentive to search far and wide for enemy ships, the proceeds of the sale of the vessels and their cargoes were divided up as prize money among the officers and the crew of capturing crew members, with the distribution governed by regulations that the captor vessel's government had established. Throughout the 1800s, war prize laws were established to help opposing countries settle claims amicably.

Private ships were also authorized by various countries at war through a letter of marque, which legally allowed a ship and commander to engage and capture vessels belonging to enemy countries. In those cases, contracts between the owners of the vessels, on the one hand, and the captains and the crews, on the other, established the distribution of the proceeds from captures.

== Legend ==
- Dates of capture are listed chronologically and appear in **bold** (Note: 1800 is usually considered part of the 18th century; ships captured that year which are listed here have histories and surrounding histories that extend into the 19th century and are included in this list for continuity and context.)
- Names of commanders are those in command when ships were captured.
- The symbol ' † ' following a commander's name denotes he was killed in action.
- Name of ship and flag of country listed are those in use at time of ship's capture and will sometimes link to a page with name and flag used after capture.
- This list does not include ships captured by pirates.

== 1800–1809 ==
=== Quasi-War ===
The Quasi-War was an undeclared war fought mostly at sea between the United States and French Republic from 1798 to 1800. France, plagued by massive crop failures and desperately in need of grain and other supplies, commissioned numerous French privateers, who both legally and illegally captured cargo from merchant vessels of every flag engaged in foreign trade with Britain. Approximately 300 American ships were captured by the French Navy and privateers under a letter of marque that was issued by the government of France. International law mandated that a ship captured during wartime by a belligerent was lost to the owner and that no compensation was to be made by the country who seized a vessel unless provided for by a treaty that ended that war.

- **Deux Anges** | France | **27 January 1800**
  A 20-gun French corvette Letter of marque captured by USS Boston commanded by George Little serving in the squadron of Silas Talbot. Deux Anges (sometimes Two Angels in contemporary American accounts) was sent to Boston under Lieutenant Robert Haswell to be condemned by a prize court.
- **Mercator** | Denmark | **May 1800**
  A Danish schooner captured by USS Experiment commanded by Lieutenant Maley entering the Haitian port of Jacmel during the Quasi-War. Maley suspected it to be a French vessel and ordered it to Cape Francois where it was recaptured by the British.
- **Godfrey** | UKGBI | **31 May 1800**
  English registered schooner commanded by H. Atkinson, captured by a French privateer and recaptured by American sloop of war USS Merrimack. (Note: Not to be confused with USS Merrimack (1855) commanded by Moses Brown.)
- **Flambeau** | France | **23 July 1800**
  A French Letter of marque of 12 guns, captured by USS Enterprise, commanded by Captain John Shaw.
- **Berceau** | France | **12 October 1800**
  A 24-gun French corvette commanded by Capitain de frégate Senez, captured by USS Boston, commanded by Capt. George Little, unbeknown that the Quasi-War had ended several days earlier. She was towed to the United States, repaired and returned to France September 1801.
- **Good Friends** | United States | **September 1809**
  An American ship out of Baltimore, commanded by Captain Robert Thompson, captured by the Danes.
- **Helvetius** | United States | **September 1809**
  An American ship out of Baltimore, commanded by Captain Ezra Bowen, captured by the Danes.

=== First Barbary War ===
The First Barbary War (1801–5), was the first of the First Barbary War and the Second Barbary War fought between the United States and the North African Berber Muslim states known collectively as the Barbary States. For years the Barbary Corsairs had harassed and captured British, French and American shipping, often capturing vessels seizing cargoes and holding crews for large ransoms or enslaving them. Refusing to pay tribute President Thomas Jefferson sent a fleet of ships to the Mediterranean shores of North Africa to deal with the constant threats to U.S. and other ships.

- **Meshboha** | Royal Moroccan Navy | **26 August 1803**
  A brig cruiser belonging to the Emperor of Morocco. Captured by USS Philadelphia, commanded by William Bainbridge.
- **USS Philadelphia** | (United States Navy) | **31 October 1803** | ( (Ottoman Empire) Ottoman Tripolitania Navy) | **16 February 1804**
  A frigate that ran aground in the Mediterranean leaving it at the mercy of the Barbary corsairs of Tripoli. She was recaptured and burned in Tripoli harbor three and a half months later by Lieutenant Stephen Decatur.
- **Mastico** | ( (Ottoman Empire) Ottoman Tripolitania Navy) | **23 December 1803**
  A ketch built in France in 1798 for Napoleon's Egyptian expedition, later sold to Tripoli and renamed Mastico. Captured by USS Enterprise and USS Constitution under the commands of Stephen Decatur and William Bainbridge respectively. Renamed **USS Intrepid**, was one of several vessels under the command of Stephen Decatur which recaptured and destroyed the USS Philadelphia 16 February 1804.
- **Transfer** | ( (Ottoman Empire) Ottoman Tripolitania Navy) | **21 March 1804**
  Former British privateer, Transfer out of Malta, later sold to Tripoli and used in blockade running during the Barbary Wars. Captured off Tripoli, by Syren commanded by Lieutenant Charles Stewart. She was renamed the USS Scourge.

=== French Revolutionary and Napoleonic Wars ===
The French Revolutionary Wars and the Napoleonic Wars were a series of wars declared against the French Republic and Napoleon's French Empire by opposing coalitions that ran from 1792 to 1815, involving many often-large-scale naval battles resulting in the capture of numerous ships. Among the most notable of such battles were the Battle of Trafalgar and the Battle of Copenhagen involving hundreds of ships and many thousands of seamen and officers.

- **HMS Ranger** |Royal Navy | **11 June 1794**
  A brig originally purchased into Royal Navy service in 1787, she was captured by the French frigate Railleuse. She was then recaptured by HMS Indefatigable on 15 October 1797. She was then captured by the French privateer Vengeance on 2 November 1797 before being captured a fourth time, this time by HMS Galatea, four days later. She was renamed HMS Venturer due to Ranger having been reused in her absence. Possibly the most captured warship in history.
- **HMS Swiftsure** | Royal Navy | **24 June 1800**
  A 74-gun ship of the line commanded by Captain Hallowell, captured by the French fleet, commanded by Admiral Ganteaume. She was later recaptured at the Battle of Trafalgar.
- **Vengeance** | French Navy | **25 August 1800**
  A Résistance-class frigate of 40 guns, commanded by Capitain de Vaisseau Citizen F. M. Pitot, attacked and captured in the Mona Passage during the French Revolutionary Wars by HMS Seine of the Royal Navy, commanded by Captain David Milne. Renamed HMS Vengeance.
- **HMS Incendiary** | Royal Navy | **10 February 1801**
  A 16-gun British sloop and fireship, commanded by Captain Richard Dun, captured by the French Navy at Cape de Gat.
- **HMS Success** | Royal Navy | **10 February 1801**
  A 32-gun fifth-rate frigate launched in 1781, captured by the French and recaptured by the British the same year.
- **HMS Sprightly** | Royal Navy | **10 February 1801**
  Captured by the French Navy.

==== Battle of Copenhagen ====
The Battle of Copenhagen was a naval battle involving a large British fleet under the command of Admiral Sir Hyde Parker, defeating and capturing many of the Danish-Norwegian fleet anchored just off Copenhagen on 2 April 1801. Vice-Admiral Horatio Nelson led the main attack.

- **HDMS Holsteen** | Royal Danish Navy | **2 April 1801**
  A 60-gun ship of the line in the Royal Dano-Norwegian Navy. She was commissioned in 1775, captured at the Battle of Copenhagen.
- **HDMS Indfødsretten** | Royal Danish Navy | **2 April 1801**
  Captured, burnt
- **HDMS Prøvesteenen** | Royal Danish Navy | **2 April 1801**
  Abandoned, captured, burnt
- **HDMS Valkyrien** | Royal Danish Navy | **2 April 1801**
  Abandoned, captured, burnt
- **HDMS Rendsborg** | Royal Danish Navy | **2 April 1801**
  Driven ashore, captured, burnt
- **HDMS Jylland** | Royal Danish Navy | **2 April 1801**
  Captured and burnt
- **HDMS Sværdfisken** | Royal Danish Navy | **2 April 1801**
  captured and burnt
- **HDMS Kronborg** | Royal Danish Navy | **2 April 1801**
  Captured and burnt
- **HDMS Haien** | Royal Danish Navy | **2 April 1801**
  Captured and burnt
- **HDMS Charlotte Amalie** | Royal Danish Navy | **2 April 1801**
  Captured and burnt
- **HDMS Søehesten** | Royal Danish Navy | **2 April 1801**
  Captured and burnt
- See also List of Danish sail frigates and List of ships of the line of Denmark

=== Napoleonic Wars (continued i) ===
- **HMS Hannibal** | Royal Navy | **6 July 1801**
  A 74-gun third-rate ship of the line of the British Royal Navy, launched on 15 April 1786, named after Hannibal of Carthage. Ran aground and captured during the first part of the Battle of Algeciras Bay.
- **Saint Antoine** French Navy | Spanish Navy (Franco-Spanish fleet) | **6–12 July 1801**
  Captured by British at the Second Battle of Algeciras.
- **Jeune Amélie** |France | **1803** captured by the privateer slaver Kitty; became Kitty's Amelia, the last vessel to legally undergo a slave trading voyage (27 July 1807) before the passage of the Slave Trade Act of 1807.
- **Embuscade** (Note: Some sources spell it as L'Ambuscade) | French Navy | **28 May 1803**
  A 32-gun fifth-rate frigate captured by HMS Victory, (Note: HMS Victory was Admiral Nelson's flagship at the Battle of Trafalgar) commanded by Captain Samuel Sutton in the Atlantic. She was restored to the Royal Navy in her old name, the existing Ambuscade being renamed HMS Seine. First captured by the British during the Battle of Tory Island in 1797, recaptured by the corvette Bayonnaise in 1798 to be recaptured by the British again in 1803.
- **Bacchante** | French Navy | **25 June 1803**
  A Serpente-class corvette bearing 18 guns. Captured by HMS Endymion, off the Azores.
- **Impatiente** | French Navy | **25 June 1803**
  A Romaine-class frigate bearing 20 guns. Captured by HMS Naiad, commanded by Captain James Wallis (Note: Not to be confused with James Wallace (Royal Navy officer) who died in 1803.) in the Bay of Biscay.
- **HMS Minerve** | Royal Navy | **3 July 1803**
  A 40-gun frigate under the command of Captain Jahleel Brenton, (re)captured by the French navy after it ran aground chasing other ships. Originally a French ship, captured by British in 1792.
- **Duquesne** | French Navy | **24 July 1803**
  A Téméraire-class 74-gun ship of the line, commanded by Commodore Quérangal. Captured by British squadron, commanded by Commodore Loring. Vessel was stranded in 1804, broken up 1805.
- **Renard** | French Navy | **25 November 1803**
  An 18-gun schooner, captured by the Royal Navy after a chase. Later renamed Crafty, and captured by the Spanish in 1807.
- **Princess Charlotte** | British East India Company | **15 September 1804**
  A 24-gun East Indiaman, captured by the French Navy in the Battle of Vizagapatam.
- **Amfitrite** | Spanish Navy | **25 November 1804**
  A 42-gun Spanish frigate, captured by the Royal Navy in the action of 25 November 1804 off Cádiz.
- **Formidable** | French Navy | **1805**
  An 80-gun ship of the line, broken up in 1816.
- **HMS Cleopatra** | Royal Navy | **18 February 1805**
  A 32-gun Amazon-class fifth-rate frigate of the Royal Navy, commanded by Sir Robert Laurie. Captured by Ville de Milan, commanded by Captain Jean-Marie Renaud.
- **HMS Calcutta** | Royal Navy | **25 September 1805**
  An East Indiaman converted to a 56-gun ship of the line. Captured by 74-gun French ship Magnanime, later ran aground and recaptured by British and set ablaze 12 April 1809 at the Battle of the Basque Roads.

==== Battle of Trafalgar ====
The Battle of Trafalgar was fought on 21 October 1805 off the Spanish coast, near Cape Trafalgar, involving the allied fleets of Spain and France against the Royal Navy of Britain. Britain's answer to Napoleon's threat, it proved to be the turning point of the Napoleonic era and is regarded as the last great sea battle of the period. The battle involved dozens of sailing warships and vessels many of which fell to capture while many were also met with what is considered a worse fate in the storm that followed.

- **Fougueux** | French Navy | **21 October 1805**
  A Téméraire-class 74-gun French ship of the line. Present at the Battle of Trafalgar, commanded by Captain Louis Alexis Baudoin who was killed in the battle, fired the first shot of the battle. After its capture by British it was wrecked in the storm of 23 October that followed the battle and sunk, taking with her all hands on board.
- **Redoutable** | French Navy | **21 October 1805**
  A Téméraire-class 74-gun ship of the line. Commanded by Captain Lucas (Note: After his release from capture Captain Lucas was personally awarded the 'Gold Cross of the Legion of Honor' by Napoleon for his courageous effort during the battle.) Redoutable is known for her fiercely fought duel with HMS Victory during the Battle of Trafalgar, killing Vice Admiral Horatio Nelson, incurring the highest losses of the battle. (Note: Redoutable lost more than 80% of her crew: 300 killed, 222 wounded.) Captured by British, she foundered during the storm the next day and sunk, taking with her all hands.
- **Bucentaure** | French Navy | **21 October 1805**
  An 80-gun ship of the line of the French Navy, lead ship of her class. It was the flagship of the French fleet at the Battle of Trafalgar, commanded by Captain Jean-Jacques Magendie. Surrendered to Captain James Atcherly of the Marines from HMS Conqueror, later wrecked in storm of 23 October 1805.
- **Algésiras** | French Navy | **21 October 1805**
  A 74-gun French ship of the line, present at the Battle of Trafalgar, under Rear Admiral Charles Magon who was killed during the boarding attempt when engaged by HMS Tonnant. Escaped after capture making her way to Cádiz.
- **Intrépide** | (French Navy) | **21 October 1805**
  A 74-gun third-rate ship of the line, captured at the Battle of Trafalgar and scuttled by British.
- **Aigle** | French Navy | **21 October 1805**
  A 74-gun French ship of the line. took part in the Battle of Trafalgar, captured during the battle. On the following day, her crew rose up turned against her captors and recaptured their ship, however, she was wrecked in the storm of 23 October 1805.
- **Indomptable** | French Navy | **21 October 1805**
  An 80-gun ship of the line of the French Navy. After engaging the British HMS Revenge, Dreadnought and Thunderer she was finally captured. During the storm of 23 October she broke her anchor chains and was wrecked with only about 150 out of 1200 men aboard surviving.
- **Berwick** | Royal Navy | French Navy | **21 October 1805**
  The British HMS Berwick, a 74-gun ship of the line, was captured by the French in 1795. She was recaptured by the British at the Battle of Trafalgar. While in tow her captives cut her cables, she struck a shoal and sank with approximately 200 perishing in the storm.
- **Swiftsure** | Royal Navy | French Navy | **21 October 1805**
  A 74-gun ship of the line, originally the British Swiftsure, commanded by Captain Hallowell, captured by the French fleet, commanded by Admiral Ganteaume, on 24 June 1800. Under the command of Captain l'Hôpitalier-Villemadrin she was recaptured at the Battle of Trafalgar and was one of the few captured ships to survive the storm.
- **Rayo** | Spanish Navy | **21 October 1805**
  An 80-gun ship of the line of the Spanish Navy. Present at the Battle of Trafalgar, noted for being the oldest vessel present. Rayo escaped from the battle but was intercepted by HMS Donegal fresh out of Gibraltar and then was wrecked 26 October 1805 in the storm that followed.
- **Santa Ana** (Note: Some sources spell name as Santa Anna) | Spanish Navy | **21 October 1805**
  A 112-gun three-decker ship of the line of the Spanish Navy. Captured by British at Battle of Trafalgar. two days later, a squadron under the command of Commodore Cosmao-Kerjulien recaptured her and took her back to Cádiz.
- **Neptuno** | Spanish Navy | **21 October 1805**
  An 80-gun Montañes-class ship of the line of the Spanish Navy. Captured at the Battle of Trafalgar, later ran aground and set fire by the British.
- **San Agustín** | Spanish Navy | **21 October 1805**
  A 74-gun ship of the line. Present at the Battle of Algeciras in 1801 and the Battle of Trafalgar in 1805.
- **Nuestra Señora de la Santísima Trinidad** | Spanish Navy | **21 October 1805**
  A first-rate ship of the line, launched in 1769, bearing 112 guns, increased to 130 guns in 1795–96. Commanded by Francisco Javier Uriarte and Rear Admiral Baltasar Hidalgo de Cisneros, present at Battle of Trafalgar, the largest ship in the allied fleet. Captured by British, wrecked in storm following day.
- **Monarca** | Spanish Navy | **21 October 1805**
  A 74-gun ship of the line, commanded by Captain Don Teodoro de Argumosa, present at Battle of Trafalgar. After its capture it was burnt on 26 October 1805. (Note: Accounts vary: 'J.Thiers' claims Monacra was smashed to pieces on the rocks during the storm that followed the battle.)
- **Bahama** | Spanish Navy | **21 October 1805**
  A 74 gun ship of the line, commanded by Commodore Dionisio Alcalá Galiano who lost his life from cannon fire. Captured by HMS Colossus, broken up in 1814.
- **San Juan Nepomuceno** | Spanish Navy | **21 October 1805**
  A 74-gun ship of the line launched in 1765, commanded by Commodore Don Cosmé Damián Churruca y Elorza who was killed in action, present at Battle of Trafalgar, with half its crew dead or wounded.
- **San Ildefonso** | Spanish Navy | **21 October 1805**
  A 74-gun ship that saw service in French, British and American waters in the late 18th century. Present at the Battle of Trafalgar, commanded by Captain Don Jose Ramón de Vargas y Varáez; captured by the British HMS Defence and renamed HMS Ildefonso, it was one of the few captured vessels that survived the storm following the battle.

=== Napoleonic Wars (continued ii) ===
- **Duguay-Trouin** | French Navy | **4 November 1805**
  74-gun Téméraire class. Captured by British, renamed HMS Implacable; training ship 1805, scuttled 1949
- **Mont Blanc** | French Navy | **4 November 1805**
  A French Ship of the line, 74 guns, she was used by the British at the Battle of Trafalgar after her capture at the Battle of Cape Ortegal. Hulked 1811, sold 1819
- **Scipion** | French Navy | **4 November 1805**
  A 74 gun ship of the line, present at the Battle of Cape Finisterre, and the Battle of Trafalgar. Captured by the British at the Battle of Cape Ortegal, later broken up 1819.
- **Viala** | (French Navy) (Note: Ship was renamed several times: Viala, Voltaire, Constitution, Jupiter) | **6 February 1806**
  Viala was a 74-gun Téméraire-class ship of the line launched in 1795. She was captured by the Royal Navy in 1806 at the Battle of San Domingo.
- **Marengo** | French Navy | **13 March 1806**
  A Téméraire-class ship of the line bearing 80 guns, commanded by Admiral Charles Linois. Captured by HMS London of 98 guns, commanded by Admiral John B. Warren, following with HMS Foudroyant, bearing 80 guns, commanded by Vice-Admiral John Chambers White. See also: Action of 13 March 1806
- **Belle Poule** | French Navy | **13 March 1806**
  A 40-gun Virginie-class frigate. Captured by HMS Foudroyant bearing 80 guns, commanded by Admiral John B. Warren. See also: Action of 13 March 1806
- **Néarque** | French Navy | **28 March 1806**
  A French brig, 16 guns, she was captured by the British off France.
- **La Bellone** | France | **12 July 1806**
  A 34-gun privateer captured off the coast of Ceylon by HMS Rattlesnake and HMS Powerful under the command of Sir Edward Pellew. See also: Action of 9 July 1806
- **Armide** | French Navy | **25 September 1806**
  A frigate of 40 guns under the command of Commodore Sir Samuel Hood. Was present at Allemand's expedition of 1805, captured by British forces during the action of 25 September 1806 by, HMS Centaur.
- **Alceste** | French Navy | **25 September 1806**
  A 38-gun Armide-class frigate of the French Navy. Captured along with Armide, Gloire and Infatigable by a four-ship squadron under Samuel Hood.
- **Alexandre** | French Navy | **1806**
  80-gun ship of Tonnant class, sold 1822.
- **Brave** | French Navy | **6 Feb 1806**
  74 gun, captured by British, foundered 1806.
- **Maida** | French Navy | 74 (1795) **6 Feb 1806**
  – ex-French Jupiter, captured by British, sold 1814.
- **HMS Crafty** | Royal Navy | **9 March 1807**
  A 14-gun schooner, boarded and captured by three Spanish warship north of Tétouan. Formerly a French warship, captured in 1803.
- **HDMS Sarpen** | Royal Danish Navy | **7 September 1807**
  A brig of the Royal Dano-Norwegian Navy, which she served from 1791 to 1807 until the British capture, taking possession under terms of capitulation following the Second Battle of Copenhagen.
- **Little Belt** | (Royal Danish Navy) | **7 September 1807**
  Originally a Danish 22-gun warship launched in 1801, captured by the British at the Second Battle of Copenhagen, renamed HMS Little Belt, commanded by Arthur Bingham. Captured second time by USS President, commanded by John Rodgers.
- **Ann Alexander** | US | **1807**
  A whaler, she was first captured by a Spanish privateer, then by a British warship, then by another Spanish privateer. Brought to Algiers, then released.
- **Piémontaise** | French Navy | **8 March 1808**
  a 40-gun Consolante-class frigate that served as a commerce raider in the Indian Ocean, commanded by Lieutenant de vaisseau Charles Moreau †. Captured by HMS St Fiorenzo of 38 guns, commanded by Captain George Nicholas Hardinge off the coast of India. She was renamed HMS Piedmontaise served in the British Royal Navy, until broken up in 1813.
- **Griffon** | French Navy | **11 May 1808**
  16-gun French Palinure-class brig, captured by HMS Bachante off Cape San Antonio, Cuba.
- **HMS Tickler** | Royal Navy | **4 June 1808**
  A 14-gun Archer-class brig built in 1804. Captured by Danish gunboats in the Great Belt. Operated under the same name by the Royal Dano-Norwegian Navy until sold off in 1815.
- **HMS Turbulent** | Royal Navy | **9 June 1808**
  A 16-gun Confounder-class brig launched in 1805. Captured by Danish gunboats off Saltholm. Operated under the same name by the Royal Dano-Norwegian Navy until sold off in 1814.
- **Neptune** | French Navy | **14 June 1808**
  80-gun French Bucentaure-class ship of the line, captured by the Spaniards in Cádiz harbour.
- **Héros** | French Navy | **14 June 1808**
  74-gun French Téméraire-class ship of the line, captured by the Spaniards in Cádiz harbour.
- **Pluton** | French Navy | **14 June 1808**
  74-gun French ship of the line, captured by the Spaniards in Cádiz harbour.
- **Algesiras** | French Navy | **14 June 1808**
  74-gun French Téméraire-class ship of the line, captured by the Spaniards in Cádiz harbour.
- **Argonaute** | French Navy | **14 June 1808**
  74-gun French ship of the line, captured by the Spaniards in Cádiz harbour.
- **Cornélie** | French Navy | **14 June 1808**
  44-gun French frigate, captured by the Spaniards in Cádiz harbour.
- **HMS Seagull** | Royal Navy | **19 June 1808**
  A 16-gun Seagull-class brig built in 1805. Captured by the sloop Lougen off Christiansand. Operated under the same name by the Royal Dano-Norwegian Navy until transferred to the fledgling Royal Norwegian Navy in 1814. Decommissioned in 1817.
- **HMS Tigress** | Royal Navy | **2 August 1808**
  A 14-gun Archer-class brig launched in 1804. Captured by Danish gunboats in the Great Belt. Operated under the same name by the Royal Dano-Norwegian Navy until sold off in 1815.
- **HMS Carnation** | Royal Navy | **3 October 1808**
  An 18-gun Cruizer-class brig-sloop launched in 1807, commanded by Charles Mars Gregory. Captured by the French brig Palinure, commanded by Captain de frègate Jance. Burnt in 1809 to avoid recapture.
- **Santo Domingo** | Spanish Navy | Captured by the British in **1809**.
- **Colibri** | French Navy | **16 January 1809**
  A French 16-carronade brig, launched in 1808, commanded by Lieutenant de Vaisseau Deslandes, captured by HMS Melampus. Taken into British service as HMS Colibri, wrecked on 23 August 1813 in Port Royal Sound.
- **Junon** | French Navy | **10 February 1809**
  A 40-gun frigate commanded by capitaine de frégate Rousseau, was the lead ship of the Junon class. While commanded by John Shortland she was recaptured on 13 December 1809 by Clorinde and Renommée and renamed HMS Junon.
- **D'Hautpoul** | French Navy | **17 April 1809**
  A Téméraire-class 74-gun ship of the line., captured by British, renamed HMS Abercrombie, sold 1817.
- **Félicité** | French Navy | **17 June 1809**
  French 36-gun frigate, 900 tons, Captured by HMS Latona, a 38-gun frigate commanded by Captain Hugh Pigot.
- **HMS Alert** | Royal Navy | **10 August 1809**
  An 18-gun brig built in 1807 for the Royal Dano-Norwegian Navy under the name Allart, captured by the British following the Second Battle of Copenhagen. Recaptured by Danish gunboats off Fredriksvern. Operated under the same name by the Royal Dano-Norwegian Navy until transferred to the fledgling Royal Norwegian Navy in 1815. Decommissioned in 1817.
- **HMS Minx** | Royal Navy | **2 September 1809**
  A 13-gun Archer-class brig launched in 1801. Captured by Danish gunboats off Skagen. Operated under the same name by the Royal Dano-Norwegian Navy until sold off in 1811.
- **HMS Junon** | Royal Navy | **13 December 1809**
  The Gloire-class frigate was captured by Clorinde, Loire, Renommée and Seine (all French Navy) off Guadeloupe with the loss of fifteen of her crew. She was set afire and scuttled the next day.
- **Amelia Wilson** | French Navy | **1809**
  French merchantman captured by the British Navy in 1809.
- See also:
  - List of French sail frigates
  - List of ships of the line of the Royal Navy
  - List of frigate classes of the Royal Navy
  - List of early warships of the English navy

== 1810–1819 ==
Napoleonic Wars (continued)

- **HMS Grinder** | Royal Navy | **13 April 1810**
  A gunboat launched in 1809. Captured by Danish gunboats off Anholt.
- **Nereide** | French Navy | **23 August 1810**
  A Sibylle-class 36-gun, copper-hulled, frigate of the French Navy. Captured by the British at Isle of France at the Battle of Grand Port. (Note: Néréide was captured three different times: first capture by British on 20 December 1797; second capture by French on 23 August 1810; third capture by British 3 December 1810.)
- **HMS Alban** | Royal Navy | **12 September 1810** | **11 May 1811**
  A schooner launched in 1806. Captured by Danish gunboats off Skagen. Operated by the Dano-Norwegian Navy under the same name until recaptured by the British in 1811.
- **Corona** | (French Navy) | **13 March 1811**
  A 40-gun Hortense-class frigate of the French Navy. Built her in 1807 for the Venetian Navy Captured by British at the Battle of Lissa.
- **HMS Little Belt (1807)** | (Royal Navy) | **16 May 1811**
  A post ship captured by John Rodgers in command of USS President. The engagement came to be known as the Little Belt affair, one of many incidents that led to the War of 1812.
- **HMS Safeguard** | Royal Navy | **29 June 1811**
  A 13-gun Archer-class brig launched in 1804. Captured by Danish gunboats off Jutland. Operated under the same name by the Royal Dano-Norwegian Navy until sold off in 1813.
- **HMS Manly** | Royal Navy | **2 September 1811**
  A 13-gun Archer-class brig launched in 1804. Captured by Danish brigs Lolland, Alsen and Samsø off Arendal. Operated under the same name by the Royal Dano-Norwegian Navy until sold off in 1813.
- **Rivoli** | French Navy | **22 Feb 1812**
  74-gun Le Pluton class, broken up 1819.
- **HMS Attack** | Royal Navy | **19 August 1812**
  A 13-gun Archer-class brig launched in 1804. Captured by Danish gunboats. Operated under the same name by the Royal Dano-Norwegian Navy until sold off in 1813.
- **HMS Laura** | Royal Navy | **8 September 1812**
- **San Antonio** | Spanish Navy | **13 October 1812.** Captured by the British sloop Merope, commanded by John Charles Gawen.
- **Trave** | French Navy | **23 October 1813**
  A 40-gun Pallas-class frigate, captured by British, broken up 1821.
- **Brillant** | French Navy | **1814**
  74-gun ship of the line, captured by the British on slip, renamed Genoa, broken up 1838.

=== War of 1812 ===
The War of 1812 was fought between Britain and the United States. The ships of the two countries were involved in many engagements along the Atlantic coast, the Great Lakes, the Gulf of Mexico and the West Indies with numerous vessels being destroyed or captured on both sides.

- **Alexander** (brig) | United States | **Unknown date**
  A civilian brig. Taken as a prize by the British
- **Lord Nelson** | | **5 June 1812** | **24 December 1815**
  A schooner commanded by Robert Percy, captured by USS Oneida, commanded by Commodore M.T. Woolsey, while enforcing the Embargo Law.
- **HMS Whiting** | Royal Navy | **8 July 1812**
  A Royal Navy Ballahoo-class schooner of 75 tons and 4 guns, launched in 1805, Lieutenant Lewis Maxey. Present at the Battle of Copenhagen, Captured at Hampton Roads by American privateer Dash commanded by Captain Garroway.
- **USS Nautilus** | United States Navy | **16 July 1812**
  Built in 1799 as a merchant vessel it was purchased by the U.S. Navy in 1803 and converted into a 16-gun brig. Commanded by Lieutenant W. Crane, it was captured off the coast of New Jersey by a blockading British fleet: Shannon, Belvidera, Africa, Eolus and Guerriere – the last vessel of these itself defeated by USS Constitution only a month later. Taken into possession for use in the Royal Navy and renamed HMS Emulous.
- **Ulysses** | Royal Navy | **20 July 1812**
  A British brig bound for Halifax from the West Indies captured by American privateer Paul Jones.
- **Henry** | | **26 July 1812**
  A new merchant ship, captured after a 15-minute fight, carrying sugar and old Madeira wine from St Croix to London by the American privateer Chasseur, commanded by Captain Thomas Boyle. Valued at $150,000-170,00, sent to Baltimore.
- **Hopewell** | Great Britain | **July 1812**
  The American privateer Chasseur, commanded by Captain Thomas Boyle, captured the merchant ship Hopewell, of 400 tons, as Hopewell was on her way to London from Surinam, carrying sugar, molasses, cotton, coffee and cocoa by. One of Hopewell's men was killed. The ship was sent to Baltimore where the cargo was valued at $150,000,.
- **John** | Great Britain | **18 September 1812**
  A merchant ship, 400 tons, captured on her passage from Demerara to Liverpool by the American privateer Chasseur, commanded by Captain Thomas Boyle. The prize was valued at $150,000-200,000 and sent to Baltimore. One of over thirty other merchant vessels captured by Boyle.
- **USS Caledonia** | United States Navy | **8 October 1812**
  Caledonia was a brig, formerly HMS Caledonia, captured by the U.S. Navy, during the War of 1812 and taken into American service. Commanded by Lieutenant D. Turner the brig played an important role with the American squadron on Lake Erie; sold at the end of the war.
- **HMS Frolic** (Note: Not to be confused with USS Frolic (1813) or USS Frolic (1862)) | Royal Navy | **8 October 1812**
  An 18-gun Cruizer-class brig-sloop, launched on 9 February 1806, commanded by Thomas Whinyates. Captured by USS Wasp, commanded by Jacob Jones.
- **USS Adams** | United States Navy | **9 October 1812**
  Adams was in drydock at Detroit for repairs when war broke out, captured by the British and renamed HMS Detroit.
- **USS Wasp** | United States Navy / Royal Navy | **15 October 1812**
  Commanded by Jacob Jones. Wasp was a sailing sloop of war captured by the British in the War of 1812. She was constructed in 1806 at the Washington Navy Yard. Captured twice.
- **Swallow** | Great Britain | **18 October 1812**
  A British packet with eighty one boxes of gold and silver aboard, captured by USS President commanded by Commodore John Rodgers with Matthew C. Perry aboard
- **HMS Macedonian** | Royal Navy | **25 October 1812**
  A 38-gun fifth rate Lively-class frigate in the Royal Navy, captured by the USS United States commanded by Stephen Decatur during the War of 1812.
- **Argo** | | **1 November 1812**
  A British whaler of 10 guns and 26 men, carrying a cargo of oil and whalebone, bound for London was captured by USS Congress under the command of Captain John Smith. The ship was ordered to the United States. She was one of the five prizes Smith took during the war.
- **HMS Java** | Royal Navy | **26 December 1812**
  A Pallas-class frigate, commanded by Henry Lambert † (Note: Mortally wounded and died seven days after the battle.), taken as a prize off coast of Brazil after its engagement with USS Constitution, commanded by William Bainbridge.
- **HMS Duke of Gloucester or Gloucester** | Royal Navy | **27 April 1813**
  A 10-gun brig launched on Lake Erie in 1807, captured American squadron under the command of Commodore Isaac Chauncey's and taken back to Sackett's Harbor. Destroyed by the British a few weeks later.
- **USS Chesapeake** | United States Navy | **1 June 1813**
  A frigate, commanded by Captain James Lawrence † that was pounded by 362 shots from HMS Shannon before its surrender.
  See: Capture of USS Chesapeake
- **USS Eagle** | United States Navy | **3 June 1813**
  Part of Thomas Macdonough's fleet overtaken by British while on blockade patrol at the Battle of Lake Champlain. Renamed HMS Finch
- **Joel Barlow** | US | **3 July 1813**
  An American Letter of marque schooner bearing only two guns, captured by HMS Briton off the coast of Bordeaux.
- **USS Argus** | United States Navy | **14 August 1813**
  A brig commanded by William Henry Allen surrendered to British after engagement with HMS Pelican in St George's Channel.
  See: Capture of USS Argus
- **HMS Boxer** | Royal Navy | **5 September 1813**
  A 12-gun Bold-class gun-brig launched in July 1812, commanded by Samuel Blyth †, captured by USS Enterprise, commanded by Lieutenant William Burrows. See also: Capture of HMS Boxer
- **HMS Confiance** | Royal Navy | **5 October 1813**
  A 16-gun fifth-rate frigate captured on Lake Erie by USS Eagle, commanded by Thomas Macdonough at the Battle of Plattsburgh.
- **Amelia** | US | **1813**
  American merchantman launched in 1810, captured by the Royal Navy, in 1813.
- **HMS Pictou** | Royal Navy | **14 February 1814**
  A 16-gun schooner built as the American privateer Syren and commissioned as Letter of marque, captured by Royal Navy 20 April 1813, renamed Pictou. Commanded by Lieutenant Edward Stephens Pictou was recaptured at Barbados during the War of 1812 by the American frigate USS Constitution commanded by Charles Stewart. (Note: Not to be confused with a second Pictou brought into the Royal Navy at Halifax after its capture as the French Bonne Foi on 30 July 1814.)
- **USS Essex** | United States Navy | **28 March 1814**
  A sailing frigate commanded by David Porter that served in the Quasi-War, the First Barbary War and the War of 1812. Captured off Valparaíso by HMS Phoebe and HMS Cherub under the command of Admiral James Hillyar and was renamed HMS Essex.
- **HMS Epervier** | Royal Navy | **29 April 1814**
  An 18-gun Cruizer-class brig-sloop commanded by Richard Walter Wales, captured off Cape Canaveral, Florida by USS Peacock with 22 guns commanded by Lewis Warrington (Note: Epervier captured a number of ships before her capture: American privateers, Portsmouth Packet, Alfred, Lively, Active)
  See also: Capture of HMS Epervier
- **USS Frolic (1813)** | United States Navy | **20 April 1814**
  Forced to surrender to superior British force 15 miles (24 km) off Matanzas, Cuba.
- **HMS Ballahou** | Royal Navy | **29 April 1814**
  A schooner of four guns, commanded by Norfolk King, was the name ship of the Royal Navy's Ballahoo-class schooners. Captured by 5-gun American privateer Perry off the coast of South Carolina.
- **HMS Reindeer** | Royal Navy | **28 June 1814**
  An 18-gun Cruizer-class brig-sloop, launched in 1804. She was under the command of Commander Nicholas Lechmere Pateshall( †) when USS Wasp, under the command of Johnston Blakely, captured her approximately 500 mi (800 km) west of Ushant. (Note: Peterson (1857) claims 'Captain Manners' was in command at time of capture.)
  See also: Sinking of HMS Reindeer
- **USS Syren** (Note: Some sources spell the name as 'Siren' .) | United States Navy | **12 July 1814**
  A brig, served in First Barbary War and War of 1812. Captured in 1814 by Royal Navy.
- **HMS Landrail** | Royal Navy | **12 July 1814**
  A 4-gun Cuckoo-class schooner, commanded by Lieutenant Robert Daniel Lancaster. Captured near Gibraltar by an American privateer Syren, a schooner sporting one heavy long gun, under Captain J.D. Daniels.
- **USS Rattlesnake** | United States Navy | **22 June 1814**
  A brig under the command of Lt. James Renshaw, was captured by the 50-gun, British frigate HMS Leander.
- **HMS Avon** | Royal Navy | **27 August 1814**
  Cruizer-class brig-sloop built by Symons at Falmouth and launched on 31 January 1805, commanded by James Arbuthnot at time of capture; Captured by USS Wasp, commanded by Commodore Johnston Blakeley.
- **USS President** (sloop) | United States Navy | **11 September 1814**
  A 12-gun sloop and the second US Navy ship to carry the name. Captured by British and renamed Icicle.
- **USS Alligator** | United States Navy | **14 December 1814**
  A sloop lost to the British at the Battle of Lake Borgne.
- **USS Tickler** | United States Navy | **14 December 1814**
  A sloop-of-war lost to the British at the Battle of Lake Borgne.
- **USS President** (frigate) | United States Navy | **15 January 1815**
  A frigate that was named by George Washington, commanded by Stephen Decatur, fell into British hands when encountered by HMS Endymion.
  See: Capture of USS President
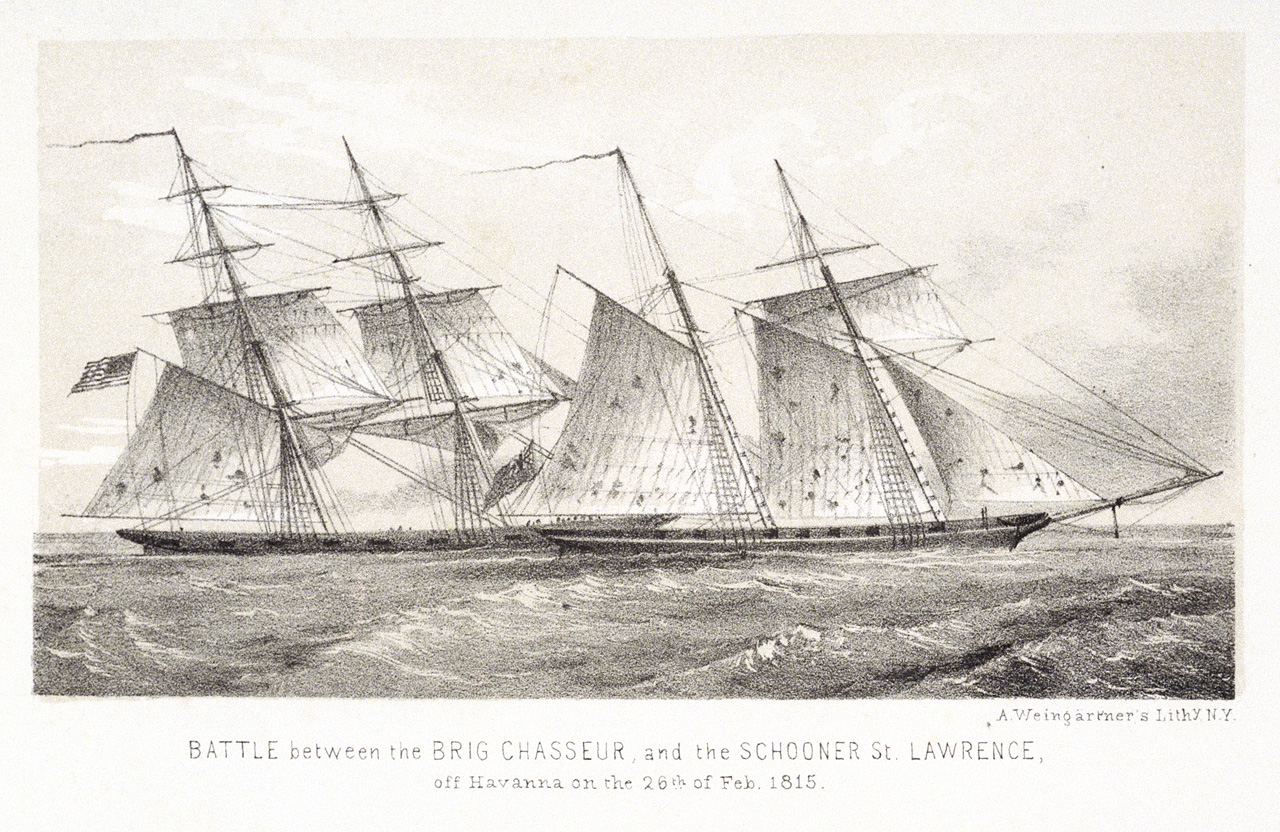
- Chasseur capturing HMS St Lawrence, 1815
  **HMS Cyane** | Royal Navy | **20 February 1815**
  A 22-gun Banterer-class sixth-rate post ship built in 1806, commanded by Captain Gordon Thomas Falcon; Captured along with HMS Levant approximately 100 miles east of Madeira by USS Constitution, commanded by Charles Stewart
- **HMS Levant** | Royal Navy | **20 February 1815**
  A 20-gun Cyrus-class post ship sixth-rate ship, commanded by Hon. George Douglas; captured along with HMS Cyane, by USS Constitution, commanded by Charles Stewart.
- **HMS St Lawrence** | Royal Navy | **26 February 1815**
  This 14-gun schooner was captured just off Havana by the American privateer Chasseur, commanded by Captain Thomas Boyle, who claimed over thirty prizes as a privateer during the war.
- **HMS Penguin** | Royal Navy | **23 March 1815**
  A 19-gun Cruizer-class brig-sloop commanded by James Dickenson; captured by 20-gun sloop-of-war USS Hornet, commanded by James Biddle, following a gunnery duel off the American cruiser base of Tristan da Cunha. Set ablaze after the removal of its stores due to irreparable damage. Final battle of the war between British and American forces.
  See: Capture of HMS Penguin
- See also: Category:War of 1812 ships of the United Kingdom

=== Second Barbary War ===
- **Mashouda** | (Ottoman Empire) Ottoman Algeria Navy | **17 June 1815**
  An Algerian frigate and flagship in the Algerian fleet during the Second Barbary War, commanded by Rais Hammida †. Captured by USS Guerriere, commanded by Stephen Decatur.
- **Estedio** | (Ottoman Empire) Ottoman Algeria Navy | **19 June 1815**
  An Algerian brig captured by American fleet under the command of Stephen Decatur.
- **Eugene** | Mexico | **17 January 1817**
  An armed Mexican schooner attempting to smuggle slaves into the United States.
- **General Ramirez** | Venezuela | **1819**
  Venezuelan privateer, captured with 280 slaves by United States ship.

=== Chilean war of independence ===
The Navy of Chile website lists 26 Spanish prizes during the War of Independence. The most famous are probably:

- **Águila (1796)** | Spain | **26 February 1817**
  first naval vessel of the Chilean Navy
- **María Isabel (1816)** | Spain | **20 October 1818**
  captured by Manuel Blanco Encalada off Santa María Island, Chile
- **Moctezuma** | Spain | **24 March 1819**
  captured by Thomas Cochrane, 10th Earl of Dundonald in El Callao
- **Esmeralda (1791)** | Spain | **5 to 6 November 1820**
  captured by Thomas Cochrane, 10th Earl of Dundonald in El Callao
- **Las Caldas** | Spain | **24 July 1824**
  captured by Thomas Cochrane, 10th Earl of Dundonald in El Callao. (later renamed Monteagudo)
- **Aquiles** | Spain | **23 June 1825**
  Ship handed over to the Chilean authorities

For vessels captured by Chilean Letter of marque ships, see list of prizes

== 1820–1829 ==
- **La Jeune Eugene** | France | **1821**
- **La Daphnee** | France | **1821**
- **La Mathilde** | France | **1821**
- **L'Elize** | France | **1821**
  Above four ships captured together by USS Alligator. All except the La Jeune Eugene escaped while being escorted to Boston. France protests.
- **Teresa** | Spain | **9 April 1824**
  A Spanish brig outfitted as a slaver, captured at Monrovia by El Vincendor, commanded by Captain Cottrell.
- **San Buenaventura** | Spain | **9 January 1827** A Spanish brig captured off Yucatán by Mexican Navy Ship of the line **Congreso Mexicano** (former Spanish Asia (ship)) with 214 men to Havana.

== 1830–1839 ==
=== West Africa Squadron ===
- **St Helena** | United Kingdom | **6 April 1830**
  a British East India packet schooner captured by pirates but retaken by her crew.
- Daspegado – Spanish pirate vessel, captor of St Helena, captured by HMS Primrose.

=== War of the Confederation ===
- **Monteagudo** | Confederation | **4 August 1836**
  Crew handed the ship over to the Chilean government

=== Texas Revolution ===
- **Correo de Mejico** | Mexican Navy | **1 September 1835**
  A Mexican Navy warship captured by the merchant ships San Felipe and Laura after a bloody exchange of cannon fire off the coast of Texas known as the San Felipe Incident. On board San Felipe was Stephen F. Austin.
- **Pelican** | Mexican Navy | **3 March 1836**
  A Mexican merchantman captured by Captain W. Brown in the Liberty, later ran aground on a sandbar and was wrecked.
- **Independence** | | **17 April 1837**
  Former cutter USRC Ingham, captured by the Mexican Navy in the Battle of the Brazos River. In service under Mexican flag as La Independencia.

=== 1839 ===
- **La Amistad** | Spain | **1839**
  A two-masted schooner built in Spain and owned by a Spaniard living in Cuba. Was used to transport Africans into slavery, who took control of the ship in 1839. Ship was captured off the coast of Long Island by USS Washington.
- **SS Eagle** | Spain | US | **November 1839**
- **SS Clara** | Spain | US | **November 1839**
- **SS Wyoming** | Spain | US | **November 1839**
- **SS Mary Anne Cassard** | Spain | US | **November 1839**
  Above four slaver ships seized together off the coast of Africa using American and Spanish flags to suit the occasion along with fraudulent papers. Captured by British cruiser and brought to United States.
- **SS Butterfly** | US | **23 September 1839**
  Fitted as a slaver, and captured by a British cruiser on the coast of Africa.
- **SS Catharine** | US | **October 1839**
  Captured on the African coast by a British cruiser, and brought by her to New York.
- **SS Euphrates** | Spain | **1839**
  With American papers, seized by British cruisers as Spanish property. Before this she had been boarded fifteen times.
- **SS My Boy** | US | **September 1839**
  Seized by a British cruiser, and condemned at Sierra Leone.

== 1840–1849 ==
- **SS Sarah Ann** | US | **March 1840**
  Captured with fraudulent papers.
- **SS Tigris** | US | **1840**
  Captured by British cruisers and sent to Boston for kidnapping.
- **SS Jones** | US | **1840**
  Seized by the British.
- **SS Shakespeare** | US | **7 November 1842**
  Shakespeare, of Baltimore, with 430 slaves, captured by British cruisers.
- **SS Cyrus** | US | **1844**
  Cyrus, of New Orleans, suspected slaver, captured by the British cruiser Alert.
- **SS Spitfire** | US | **14 May 1845**
  Spitfire, of New Orleans, captured on the coast of Africa, under American flag and the captain indicted in Boston.
- **SS Casco** | US | **1849**
  Slaver, with no papers; searched, and captured with 420 slaves, by a British cruiser.

=== Mexican–American War ===
At the onset of the Mexican–American War on 12 May 1846, Commodore John D. Sloat was in command of the Pacific fleet. The Pacific war against Mexico lasted only eight months with few casualties. The Pacific fleet consisted mainly of ten ships: two ships of the line, two frigates, two sloops-of-war, and four sloops. As the Mexican navy was very small few vessels were ever captured.

- **Malek Adhel** | Mexican Navy | **21 August 1846**
  Mexican merchant brig captured by sloop of war USS Warren under the command Lieutenant William Radford.
- **Alerta** | Mexican Navy | **10 November 1847**
  A sloop captured by the chartered Libertad with its crew of eleven in the Gulf of California, about twenty-five miles north of Mulegé.

=== First Schleswig War ===
During the First Schleswig War (1848 – 1850) the Royal Danish Navy first supported the Danish Army's advance south against the rebels in Schleswig-Holstein, and later blockaded the German ports.

- **Christian der achte** | Schleswig-Holstein Private ship | **31 March 1848**
  A civilian steamship, captured by the Danish naval steamer Hekla and the brig St. Thomas at Aabenraa. Used as a transport by the Royal Danish Navy.
- **Gefion** | Royal Danish Navy | **5 April 1849**
  A frigate, captured by Prussian forces during the Battle of Eckernförde.
- **Von der Tann** | Schleswig-Holstein | **1853**
  A gunboat, surrendered to the Royal Danish Navy after the end of the First Schleswig War. Commissioned into Danish service as Støren

== 1850–1859 ==
- **SS Martha** | US | Empire of Brazil | **7 June 1850**
  Martha, of New York, captured by USS Perry when about to embark from southern coast of Africa with 1800 slaves. The captain was admitted to bail, and escaped.
- **Volusia** | Empire of Brazil | **2 July 1850**
  A Brazilian brig outfitted as a slaver with a Brazilian crew, carrying false papers under the American flag, captured near Kabinda off the Congo River by British steam-sloop HMS Rattler, commanded by Arthur Cumming.
- **SS Lucy Ann** | US | **1850**
  Lucy Ann, of Boston, captured with 547 slaves by the British.
- **SS Navarre** | Country of origin unknown | **1850**
  Slaver, trading to Brazil, boarded, searched and seized by the commander of H. M. steam-sloop HMS Firefly.
- **SS Glamorgan** | US | **1853**
  Glamorgan, of New York, captured when about to depart with approximately 700 slaves.
- **SS Grey Eagle** | US | **1854**
  Grey Eagle, of Philadelphia, captured off Cuba by British.
- **SS William Clark** | US | **1857**
  Ship from New Orleans, seized after prolonged surveillance by HMS Firefly.
- **SS Jupiter** | US | **1857**
  Fitted out at New Orleans, captured by HMS Antelope with 70 slaves aboard.
- **SS Eliza Jane** | US | **22 August 1857**
  Fitted out at New York, captured by HMS Alecto without papers or colors.
- **SS Jos. H. Record** | US | Spain |**1857**
  A schooner from Newport, Rhode Island, captured by HMS Antelope with 191 slaves aboard. Crew members from Spain and USA.
- **SS Onward** | US | **1857**
  Slaver vessel out of Boston, suspected of several smuggling attempts under American colors. Captured by HMS Alecto.
- **SS Echo** | US | Empire of Brazil | **21 August 1858**
  The Echo was commanded by Captain Edward Townsend and financed by foreign nationals from Brazil and was captured by USS Dolphin off the northern coast of Cuba near the Santaren Channel with 306 slaves.

== 1860–1869 ==
- **SS Erie** | US | **1860**
  Erie, transporting 897 Africans from African coast, captured by a United States ship. The captain of the ship, Nathaniel Gordon, was later executed by the U.S. government for slave trading.
- **Nightingale** | Empire of Brazil | **21 April 1861**
  Originally the tea clipper and slave ship Nightingale, launched in 1851, captured in Africa in 1861 by Saratoga, taken as a prize and purchased by the United States Navy.

=== American Civil War ===
During the American Civil War the Union blockade at first proved to be ineffective at keeping ships from entering or leaving southern ports, but towards the end of the war, it played a significant role in its victory over the Confederate states. By the end of the war, the Union Navy had captured many Confederate ships, moreover had also captured more than 1,100 blockade runners while destroying or running aground another 355 vessels. Using specially designed blockade runners, private business interests from Britain, however, succeeded in supplying the Confederate Army with goods valued at $200 million, including 600,000 small arms. That extended the war by two years and cost the lives of 400,000 additional Americans.

- **USMS Nashville** | United States | **13 April 1861**
  A brig-rigged, side-paddle-wheel passenger steamer originally built as a United States Mail Service ship. Captured 13 April 1861 at Charleston harbor after the fall of Fort Sumter and renamed CSS Nashville.
- **USS Merrimack** (Note: Many (most?) sources spell the name as Merrimac without the 'k'.) | United States | **21 April 1861**
  A steam-driven screw frigate, was burned to the waterline and sunk 20 April 1861 in preparation for the surrender of the Gosport Shipyard the next day. Floated and rebuilt as casemate ironclad CSS Virginia, she participated in the Battle of Hampton Roads but was scuttled 11 May 1862 to avoid recapture.
- **Enchantress** | United States Private ship| **6 July 1861** | Confederate States Navy | **20 July 1861**
  A civilian schooner, captured by the Confederate privateer Jefferson Davis, later recaptured by USS Albatross off Hatteras Inlet, North Carolina, on 20 July 1861.
- **CSS A. J. View** | Confederate States Navy | **28 November 1861**
  A collier while cruising in Mississippi Sound 28 November 1861, the Union screw steamer USS R. R. Cuyler seized A. J. View off Pascagoula, Mississippi, when the schooner attempted to slip out to sea.
- **SS Arizona** | United States Private ship| **15 January 1862** | Confederate States Navy | **28 October 1862**
  A civilian side-wheel steamer, captured by Confederate forces at New Orleans. Pressed into Confederate naval service, she was recaptured by USS Montgomery off Mobile, Alabama, on 28 October 1862.
- **SS Magnolia** | United States Private ship| **15 January 1862** | Confederate States Navy | **19 February 1862**
  A civilian side-wheel steamer, captured by Confederate forces at New Orleans. Pressed into service as a blockade runner, she was recaptured by USS Brooklyn and USS South Carolina off Mobile, Alabama, on 19 February 1862, then pressed into service with the US Navy blockade fleet as USS Magnolia.
- **CSS Calhoun** | Confederate States Navy | **23 January 1862**
  A 508-ton side-wheel steamer and gunboat, built in 1851 at New York City as the civilian steamer Calhoun. Served as a Confederate privateer and used as a blockade runner in May 1861.
- **CSS Eastport** | Confederate States Navy | **7 February 1862**
  A steamer and ironclad, at Cerro Gordo, Tennessee, captured by three Union gunboats. Renamed USS Eastport, later destroyed on Red River 15 April 1864 to prevent recapture.
- **CSS Ellis** | Confederate States Navy | **10 February 1862;**
  a gunboat in the Confederate States Navy and the United States Navy during, later lost during a raid while under command of Lieutenant William B. Cushing.
- **CSS Teaser** | Confederate States Navy | **10 February 1862;**
  After capture was taken into the United States Navy and assigned to the Potomac Flotilla.
- **Darlington** | CSA | **3 March 1862**
  A Confederate sidewheel steamer, commanded by J.W. Godfrey, captured by USS Pawnee at Cumberland Sound, Florida.
- **Bermuda** | CSA | **27 April 1862**
  A large iron-hulled screw steamer of 1,238 tons built in 1861 at Stockton-on-Tees as a blockade runner for transporting military supplies to the Confederacy, commanded by Charles W. Westendorff. Captured by USS Mercedita, commanded by Henry S. Stellwagen.
- **CSS Victoria** | Confederate States Navy | **6 June 1862**
  A side-wheel steamer acquired by the Confederate Government for service as a troop transport on the waters of the Mississippi River. Captured by Union forces at the First Battle of Memphis and renamed USS Abraham.
- **SS Mexico** | US Private ship | Confederate States Navy | **6 June 1862**
  Originally the 1043-ton side-wheel river steamer, built 1851 at NY, owned by Southern Steamship Co. Pressed into service by the Confederacy at New Orleans 15 January 1862. She ran aground during the First Battle of Memphis, captured, renamed USS General Bragg.
- **CSS General Sumter** | Confederate States Navy | **6 June 1862**
  A side wheel steamer, Capt. W. W. Lamb. Built as Junius Beebe, in 1853 at Algiers, Louisiana. Captured during the First Battle of Memphis by Union forces, renamed USS Sumter.
- **Napier** | CSA | **29 July 1862**
  Blockade runner captured by USS Chippewa (Note: Accounts of capturing ship differ: The Naval History Division, Office of the Chief of Naval Operations claim it was USS Mount Vernon and USS Mystic that captured the Napier.)
- **Memphis** | CSA | **31 July 1862**
  A 7-gun screw steamer, built by William Denny and Brothers, in Scotland in 1861, serving as a blockade runner before being captured by USS Magnolia and taken into the Union Navy.
- **CSS De Soto** | United States Navy Private ship | Confederate States Navy | **30 September 1862**
  A sidewheel steamer, taken over by the Confederate forces for use on the Mississippi River. Carrying Confederate officers, she was surrendered to Union forces and taken into the Union Army as transport, then transferred to the Navy as USS De Soto and later renamed USS General Lyon.
- **CSS Emily Murray** | Confederate States Navy | **9 February 1863**
  Confederate schooner captured by USS Coeur de Lion while enforcing the blockade off Machodoc Creek, Virginia.
- **CSS Robert Knowles** | Confederate States Navy | **9 February 1863**
  Confederate schooner captured by USS Coeur de Lion while enforcing the blockade off Machodoc Creek, Virginia.
- **USS Queen of the West (1854)** | United States Navy | Confederate States Navy | **14 February 1863**
  A Paddle steamer converted into a ram for the United States Ram Fleet, she ran aground after taking heavy fire from the Fort DeRussy shore batteries, and was captured by the Confederate States Army.
- **Peterhoff** | CSA ~ United States Navy | **25 February 1863**
  A specially built blockade-running steamer, captured leaving St. Thomas by the USS Vanderbilt, commanded by Commodore Charles Wilkes.
- **USS Cherokee** |Confederate States Navy ~ United States Navy | **8 May 1863**
  A former blockade runner she was captured by USS Canandaigua leaving Charleston, South Carolina.
- **CSS Atlanta** | Confederate States Navy | **17 June 1863**
  A 1006-ton Casemate ironclad Built in Glasgow, originally named Fingal. She ran the blockade into Savannah, Georgia, in November 1861 with a large cargo of weapons and military supplies. Later ran aground and captured by John Rodgers (Note: John Rodgers was the grandson of the famous Commodore John Rodgers born in 1772.) in command of USS Weehawken in Wassaw Sound.
- **CSS Archer** | Confederate States Navy | **25 June 1863**
  originally a fishing schooner captured by the Confederate cruiser CSS Tacony and converted into a Confederate cruiser for commerce raiding.
- **SS Britannia** | CSA Private ship | **25 June 1863**
  An iron-hulled, side-wheel steamer laid down and built in 1862 to run through the Union Navy's blockade. Captured by USS Santiago de Cuba.
- **CSS Merrimac** | Confederate States Navy | **24 July 1863**
  A sidewheel steamer commanded by William P. Rogers used as a blockade runner. Captured by USS Iroquois commanded by J. S. Palmer off the coast of Cape Fear River, North Carolina.
- **SS Emma** | CSA Private ship | **24 July 1863**
  A Baltimore, Maryland-built vessel which was operating out of Nassau, Bahamas, under a Bahamian register, captured by USS Adirondack while trying to evade the Union blockade.
- **CSS Robert E. Lee** | Confederate States Navy | **9 November 1863**
  A schooner-rigged, iron-hulled, paddle-steamer used as a blockade runner commanded by Lieutenant Richard H. Gayle. Captured off the coast of North Carolina by USS James Adger and USS Iron Age.
- **CSS Annie Thompson** | Confederate States Navy | **16 January 1864**
  A sloop and blockade runner, run aground and captured by USS Fernandina at St. Cathrine's Sound.
- **USRC Dodge** | United States Navy | Confederate States Navy | **4 April 1864**
  Seized by the Confederates at Galveston, Texas, at the war's outbreak and renamed Mary Sorly. Recaptured by USS Sciota trying to run the blockade.
- **CSS Bombshell** | Confederate States Navy | **5 May 1864**
  An Erie Canal steamer – was a U.S. Army transport, later sunk by the Confederate batteries on 18 April 1864, then raised and taken into the Confederate States Navy under the command of Lieutenant Albert Gallatin Hudgins, CSN.
- **SS Tristram Shandy** CSA **15 May 1864**
  An iron-hulled sidewheel steamer completed in 1864 at Greenock, used as a blockade runner, captured by the USS Kansas.
- **USS Water Witch** | United States Navy | **3 June 1864**
  A wooden-hulled, sidewheel gunboat used in Gulf blockading squadron, captured by CSN gunboat fleet in Ossabaw Sound, 1st Lt. Thomas P. Pelot in command.
- **CSS Selma** | Confederate States Navy | **5 August 1864**
  Captured at Battle of Mobile Bay.
- **CSS Tennessee** | Confederate States Navy | **5 August 1864**
  An ironclad ram, commissioned 16 February 1864, Lieutenant James D. Johnston in command. Later became the flagship of Admiral Franklin Buchanan who surrendered at the Battle of Mobile Bay.
- **CSS Advance** | Confederate States Navy | **10 September 1864**
  A side-wheel steamer, built at Greenock, Scotland, in 1862, purchased by the CSA (North Carolina) under the name Lord Clyde in 1863, renamed Advance for running Union blockade. Vessel made 20 blockade runs before its capture by USS Santiago de Cuba off Wilmington, North Carolina. Renamed USS Frolic in 1865.
- **CSS Albemarle** | Confederate States Navy | **27 October 1864**
  A steam-powered ironclad ram of the Confederate Navy (and later the second Albemarle of the United States Navy), commanded by Captain James W. Cooke, sunk by spar torpedo, captured, raised, and sold.
- **CSS Lady Sterling** | Confederate States Navy | **28 October 1864**
  Confederate blockade runner CSS Lady Stirling, built by James Ash at Cubitt Town, London, in 1864. She was badly damaged and captured by the United States Navy on 28 October 1864 off Wilmington, North Carolina.
- **USS Undine** | United States Navy | **30 October 1864**
  Union tinclad warship captured by Nathan Bedford Forrest's Confederate cavalry on the Tennessee River near Johnsonville, Tennessee. Operated by Forret's Confederates for several days before being scuttled on 4 November.
- **Charter Oak** | US | **5 November 1864**
  A schooner and cargo ship out of Boston, commanded by Samuel J. Gilman, used in the American Civil War, captured by CSS Shenandoah, commanded by Captain James Iredell Waddell and burned in 1864.
- **D. Godfrey** | US | **8 November 1864**
  A cargo bark from Boston, captured by CSS Shenandoah, commanded by Captain James Iredell Waddell, sunk southwest of the Cape Verde Islands. See also: Vessels captured by CSS Shenandoah
- **CSS Florida** | Confederate States Navy | **28 November 1864**
  A cruiser in the Confederate States Navy, commanded by John Newland Maffitt (a privateer), captured by USS Wachusett, commanded by Rear Admiral Napoleon Collins, later sunk in collision with USAT Alliance, a troop ferry, 28 November 1864.
- **SS Syren** | CSA | **18 February 1865**
  The Syren (Note: also spelled as Siren) was a sidewheel steamer built at Greenwich, Kent, England in 1863 and designed for outrunning and evading the vessels on Union blockade patrol. Owned by the Charleston Importing and Exporting Company, the Syren made her first run on 5 November 1863, running supplies from Nassau to Wilmington. The Syren completed a record 33 runs through the blockade, the most of any blockade runner. Abandoned and set fire the Union Army captured her in Charleston harbor where she had successfully run in through the blockade the night before.
  See also: Wilmington, North Carolina in the American Civil War
- **CSS Columbia** | Confederate States Navy | **18 February 1865**
  An ironclad ram. Found by Union forces near Fort Moultrie when they took possession of Charleston in 1865.
- **CSS Texas** | Confederate States Navy | **4 April 1865**
  A twin propeller casement ironclad ram, captured at Richmond navy yard by union forces after city was evacuated.
- See also:
  - Ships of the Union navy
  - Blockade runners of the American Civil War
  - List of ships of the Confederate States Navy

=== Second Schleswig War ===
During the Second Schleswig War in 1864 the Royal Danish Navy blockaded the German ports. While the Danes suffered military defeat on land during the conflict, their navy succeeded in maintaining the blockade throughout the war.

- **Neptunus** | Germany Private ship | **8 March 1864**
  A civilian ship, captured by the Danish frigate Jylland off Helsingør.
- **Eudora** | Hamburg Private ship | **2 April 1864**
  A civilian barque, captured by the Danish corvette Dagmar off Hamburg.

=== Chincha Islands War ===
The Chincha Islands War (1864 – 1866) was a mostly naval conflict between Spain and her former South American colonies Peru, Chile, Ecuador and Bolivia.

- **Virgen de Covadonga** | Spanish Navy | **26 November 1865**
  The naval schooner was captured in the Battle of Papudo by the Chilean corvette Esmeralda. Pressed into Chilean service, she was sunk by a naval mine during the War of the Pacific in 1880.
- **Paquete de Maule** | Chilean Navy | **6 March 1866**
  The sidewheel steamer was captured by Spanish frigates. She was burned and destroyed by the Spanish on 10 May 1866.
- **Pampero** | Chilean Navy | **22 August 1866**
  The naval steamer was captured by the Spanish frigate Gerona in the action of 22 August 1866 off Madeira. She was pressed into Spanish naval service and remained so until sunk by Nationalist aircraft at Barcelona during the Spanish Civil War in 1938.

== 1870–1879 ==
=== Ten Years' War ===
The Ten Years' War was fought between Cuban revolutionaries and Spain. Breaking out in 1868, the war was won by Spain by 1878.

- **Virginius** | (United States) | **30 October 1873**
  The blockade runner, carrying 103 Cuban soldiers, was captured by the Spanish corvette Tornado. After initially executing 53 crew members as pirates, the Spanish authorities were pressured by the US and British governments to release the ship and the 91 surviving crew in December 1873.

=== War of the Pacific ===
The War of the Pacific (1879 – 1883) was fought between Peru and Bolivia on one side, with Chile on the other. Chile emerged victorious.

- **Rimac** | Chilean Navy | **23 July 1879**
  The troopship was captured by the Peruvian ironclad Huáscar and the Peruvian corvette Unión off Antofagasta. The ship was taken into service with the Peruvian Navy.
- **Huáscar** | Peruvian Navy | **8 October 1879**
  The ironclad was captured by Chilean naval forces in the Battle of Angamos. The ship was taken into service with the Chilean Navy under the same name and is still afloat as a museum and historical memorial ship at the port of Talcahuano, Chile
- **Pilcomayo** | Peruvian Navy |**18 November 1879**
  captured by Chilean Blanco Encalada.
- **Alay** | Peruvian Navy | **22 December 1879**
  captured by Chilean transporter Amazonas between Panama and El Callao.

== 1880–1889 ==
(Ship names / Information forthcoming)

== 1890–1899 ==
=== First Sino-Japanese War ===
The 1894–95 First Sino-Japanese War was fought between Qing Dynasty China and Meiji Japan over dominance of Korea. The war ended in Japanese victory and great Chinese loss of territory and prestige.

- **Tsao-kiang** | Beiyang Navy | **27 July 1894**
  The gunboat was captured by the Japanese cruiser Akitsushima during the Battle of Pungdo. She served in the Japanese Navy and government service under the name Sōkō until 1924. Sold to civilian interests, she sailed as a transport until scrapped in 1964.
- **Fulong** | Beiyang Navy | **7 February 1895**
  The torpedo boat was captured by Japanese forces during the Battle of Weihaiwei on 7 February 1895. She served in the Japanese Navy under the name Fukuryū until sold for scrap in 1908.
- **Jiyuan** | Beiyang Navy | **17 February 1895**
  The cruiser was captured by Japanese forces after the 17 February 1895 Battle of Weihaiwei. She served in the Japanese Navy under the name Saien until mined and sunk off Port Arthur on 30 November 1904, during the Russo-Japanese War.
- **Pingyuan** | Beiyang Navy | **17 February 1895**
  The armored cruiser was captured by Japanese forces after the 17 February 1895 Battle of Weihaiwei. She served in the Japanese Navy first under the name Ping Yuen Go and later as Heien until mined and sunk west of Port Arthur on 18 September 1904, during the Russo-Japanese War.
- **Zhenyuan** | Beiyang Navy | **17 February 1895**
  The turret ship was captured by Japanese forces after the 17 February 1895 Battle of Weihaiwei. She served in the Japanese Navy under the name Chin'en until scrapped in 1914.

=== Spanish–American War ===
The Spanish–American War lasted only ten weeks and was fought in both the Caribbean and the Pacific theaters. American naval power proved decisive, allowing U.S. expeditionary forces to disembark in Spanish controlled Cuba which was already under constant pressure from frequent insurgent attacks. It is the only American war that was prompted by the fate of a single ship, the USS Maine, then berthed in a Cuban harbor, which exploded while its crew lay asleep.

- **Saranac** | (United States) | **26 February 1898**
  The bark Saranac—under Captain Bartaby—was captured in the Philippines by the Spanish gunboat Elcano carrying 1,640 short tons (1,490 t) of coal from Newcastle, New South Wales, to Iloilo, for Admiral Dewey's fleet.
- **Elcano** | Spanish Navy | **1 May 1898**
  The gunboat was captured by US naval forces during the Battle of Manila Bay on 1 May 1898. She was officially turned over to the US Navy on 9 November 1898.
- **Reina Mercedes** | Spanish Navy | **17 July 1898**
  The scuttled cruiser was captured by US naval forces at Santiago de Cuba. The ship was raised in 1899 and taken into service with the US Navy.

== See also ==
- Lists of ships
- List of ships captured in the 18th century
- List of naval battles
- List of single-ship actions
- History of the Royal Navy
- History of the United States Navy
- Bibliography of early American naval history
- Bibliography of 18th-19th century Royal Naval history

== Bibliography ==
- Allen, Gardner Weld (1905). Our Navy and the Barbary Corsairs. Houghton Mifflin & Co., Boston, New York & Chicago, 354 pages. – Book
- Allen, Gardner Weld (1909). Our naval war with France. Houghton Mifflin & Co., Boston, New York and Chicago, 323 pages. Book
- Ammen, Daniel (1883). The Navy in the Civil War. Charles Scribner's Sons, New York, 282 pages. Book
- Boatner, Mark M. III (1988). The Civil War Dictionary (Revised ed.). New York: David McKay. ISBN 978-0-8129-1726-0.
- Brenton, Edward Pelham (1824). The naval history of Great Britain: from the year MDCCLXXXIII to MDCCCXXII. C. Rice, J. F. Dove, London, 536 pages. Book
- Bush, Richard (1896). Official records of the Union and Confederate navies in the war of the rebellion. Government Printing Office, Washington; Hon.H.A. Herbert, Secretary of the Navy; Lieut. Richard Bush, USN, Superintendent Naval War records, 252 pages. Book
- Canney, Donald L. (1826). Sailing warships of the US Navy. Chatham Publishing / Naval Institute Press, 224 pages. ISBN 1-55750-990-5. Book
- Clark, James Stainer; M'Arthur, John (1810). The life of Admiral Lord Nelson, K.B., from his lordship's manuscripts. T. Bensley, London, 702 pages. Book1 Book2
- Clowes, Sir William Laird; Markham, Sir Clements Robert; Mahan, Alfred Thayer; Wilson, Herbert Wrigley; Roosevelt, Theodore; Laughton, Leonard George Carr (1901). The royal navy: a history from the earliest times to the present, Volume 6. Sampson Low, Marston and co., London limited, 592 pages. Book
- Coggeshall, George (1856). History of the American privateers, and letters-of-marque: ... G.Coggeshall; C.T.Evans, Agent. New York, 438 pages. Book
- Colomb, Philip Howard (1905). The battle of Trafalgar. W. Clowes & Sons, Limited, 18 pages. Book
- Cooper, James Fenimore (1856). History of the navy of the United States of America. Stringer & Townsend, New York, 508 pages. OCLC 197401914. Book
- Corbett, Sir Julian Stafford (1919). The campaign of Trafalgar, Volume 2. Longmans, Green, and Co., 538 pages. Book
- Coulter, Ellis Merton (1994) [1950]. The Confederate States of America, 1861–1865 (7th ed.). Louisiana State University Press, 644 pages. ISBN 0-8071-0007-2. Book
- "Dictionary of American Naval Fighting Ships". Department of the Navy – Naval Historical Center.
- Daniels, Secretary of the Navy, Josephus; Marsh, Captain, U.S. Navy, retired, C.C. (1921). Official records of the Union and Confederate navies in the War of the Rebellion. Government Printing Office, United States. Naval War Records Office, United States. Office of Naval Records and Library, 276 pages. ISBN 1-58218-556-5. Book
- Davies, David Tudor (1996). Nelson's navy: English fighting ships, 1793–1815. Stackpole Books, Penn., 201 pages. ISBN 9780811711180., Book
- Dow, George Francis (2002). Slave Ships and Slaving. Courier Dover Publications, New York, 396 pages. ISBN 0-486-42111-2. Book
- Du Bois, William Edward Burghardt (1904). The suppression of the African slave-trade to the United States of America. Longmans, Green and co., New York, London, 355 pages. Book
- Eastman, Ralph M. (2004). Some Famous Privateers of New England. Kessinger Publishing, LLC. p. 96. ISBN 1-4179-0676-6. Book
- Foote, Andrew Hull (1854). Africa and the American flag. D. Appleton & Co., New York, 390 pages. Book
- Fraser, Edward (1906). The enemy at Trafalgar: ... E. P. Dutton & Co., New York, 1906, 436 pages. Book
- Great Britain, Foreign and Commonwealth Office, ed. (1857). British and foreign state papers, Volume 28. Harrison and Sons, London, 1408 pages. Book
- Griffis, William Elliot (1887). Matthew Calbraith Perry: a typical American naval officer. Cupples and Hurd, Boston, 459 pages. ISBN 1-163-63493-X. Book
- Guttridge, Leonard F (2006). Our Country, Right Or Wrong: The Life of Stephen Decatur. Tom Doherty Associates, LLC, New York, N.Y., 304 pages. ISBN 9780765307026. Book
- Harris, Gardner W. (1837). The life and services of Commodore William Bainbridge, United States navy. Carey Lea & Blanchard, Philadelphia, 254 pages. ISBN 0-945726-58-9. Book1 Book2
- Harrison, Henry William (1858). Battlefields and naval exploits of the United States: ... H. C. Peck & Theo. Bliss, Philadelphia, 448 pages. Book
- Heidler, David Stephen (2004). Encyclopedia of the War of 1812. Naval Institute Press, Annapolis, Md., 636 pages. ISBN 1-59114-362-4. Book
- Hill, Frederic Stanhope (1905). Twenty-six historic ships. G.P. Putnam's Sons, New York and London, 515 pages. OCLC 1667284. Book
- James, William (1817). Naval occurrences of the War of 1812: ... Conway Maritime Press / Naval Institute Press, 405 pages. ISBN 0-85177-987-5. Book
- ——; Chamier, Frederick (1837). The naval history of Great Britain: from the declaration of war by France in 1793 to the accession of George IV. Richard Bentley, London, 568 pages. Book
- —— (1837). The Naval History of Great Britain: 1805–1807. Conway Maritime Press, London, 424 pages., E'Book
- Lavery, Brian (1983). The Ship of the Line Volume I. Naval Institute Press, 358 pages. ISBN 0-85177-252-8., Book
- Lewis, Charles Lee (1924). Famous American Naval Officers. L. C. Page & Company, Inc., 444 pages. ISBN 0-8369-2170-4., Book
- Lewis, Charles Lee (1937). The Romantic Decatur. Ayer Publishing, 296 pages. ISBN 0-8369-5898-5.
- Mackenzie, Alexander Slidell (1846). Life of Stephen Decatur: a commodore in the Navy of the United States. C. C. Little and J. Brown, 443 pages. E'book
- Maclay, Edgar Stanton (1894). A history of the United States Navy, from 1775 to 1893. D. Appleton & Company, New York, 647 pages. Book
- Malcomson, Robert (2006). Historical dictionary of the War of 1812. Scarecrow Press/Rowman & Littfield, Maryland, 701 pages. ISBN 9780810854994. Book
- Dept U.S. Navy. Ships Histories Dictionary of American Naval Fighting Ships (DANFS). Department of the Navy – Naval Historical Center. Archived from the original on 19 August 2000.
- Norie, John William (1827). The naval gazetteer, biographer, and chronologist;... J.W. Norie & Company, London, 586 pages. Book
- Nova Scotia. Vice-admiralty court, Halifax (1911). American vessels captured by the British during the revolution and war of 1812. The Essex Institute, Salem Massachusetts, 166 pages. Book
- Peterson, Charles Jacobs (1857). The American navy: being an authentic history of the United States navy ... Jas. B. Smith & Co, Philadelphia 545 pages. Book
- Phillips, Michael. "Ships of the Old Navy". The Age of Nelson / Michael Phillips.
- Roosevelt, Theodore (1883). The naval war of 1812. G.P. Putnam's sons, New York, 541 pages. Book
- Scharf, J. Thomas (1887). History of the Confederate States Navy. New York: Rogers & Sherwood.
- Southey, Robert (1896). Robert Southey's Life of Nelson. Longmans, Green, and Co., London, Bombay, 302 pages. E'book
- Thiers, Adolphe Joseph (1850). History of the Consulate and the Empire of France Under Napoleon. Henery G. Bohn, London, 1850, 302 pages. E'book
- Thomson, John Lewis (1817). Historical sketches of the late war, between the United States and Great Britain. Thomas Desilver, 367 pages. Book
- Tucker, Spencer (2004). Stephen Decatur: a life most bold and daring. Naval Institute Press, 2004 Annapolis, MD, 245 pages. ISBN 1-55750-999-9. Book
- —— (2006). Blue & gray navies: the Civil War afloat. Naval Institute Press, Maryland, 426 pages. ISBN 1-59114-882-0. Book
- —— (2012). The Encyclopedia of the War of 1812. ABC-CLIO, 1034 pages. Book
- United States Congress (1858). Congressional Edition, 1858. William A. Harris, Washington, 390 pages. Book
- Wagner, Margaret E.; Gallagher, Gary W.; McPherson, James M. (2006). The Library of Congress Civil War Desk Reference. Simon and Schuster Inc., New York, 2006, 946 pages. ISBN 9781439148846. Book
- Wilkinson, John (1877). The Narrative of a Blockade-Runner. Sheldon & Company, New York, 252 pages. Book1 Book2
- Williams, Greg H. (1824). The French assault on American shipping, 1793–1813. McFarland & Company, North Carolina, London, 536 pages. ISBN 978-0-7864-3837-2. Book
- Winfield, Rif (2008). British Warships in the Age of Sail 1793–1817: Design, Construction, Careers and Fates. Seaforth. ISBN 978-1-86176-246-7.
- Wyllie, Arthur (2007). The Union Navy. Lulu.com, 668 pages. ISBN 978-1-4303-2117-0. Book
- Wyllie, Arthur (2007). The Confederate States Navy. Lulu.com, 466 pages. ISBN 978-0-615-17222-4. Book
- Yonge, Charles Duke (1863). The history of the British Navy: from the earliest period to the present time:in two volumes, Volume 2. Richard Bentley, 809 pages. E'book
