= Lists of sail frigates =

There are several lists of sail frigates:

- List of Danish sail frigates
- List of Egyptian sail frigates
- List of French sail frigates
- List of German sail frigates
- List of Italian sailing frigates
- List of Netherlands sail frigates
- List of sail frigates of the Ottoman Empire
- List of Russian sail frigates
- List of Spanish sail frigates
- List of sailing frigates of the United States Navy
