= List of ships of the line of Denmark =

This is a list of ships of the line (ironclads, coastal defence ships or battleships) serving either in the Royal Danish Navy or the Royal Dano-Norwegian Navy.

== Sail battleships (ships of the line) ==
- Hercules 81 guns - Captured by Sweden 1563, returned 1570
- Hector 38 guns - Captured by Sweden 1563 and renamed Danska Hektor, scuttled c. 1566
- Hjort 46 guns - Captured by Sweden 1563, returned 1570
- Byens Loffue 56 guns - Captured by Sweden 1564 and renamed Böse Lejon, returned 1570
- Morian 47 guns - Captured by Sweden 1564 and renamed Danska Morian, returned 1570
- David 42 guns - Captured by Sweden 1564, returned 1570
- Skotske Pink 56 guns - Captured by Sweden 1564 and renamed Skotska Pincka, recaptured 1569
- Jegermesther 90 guns - Captured by Sweden 1565, returned 1570
- Merkurius - Storm 1566
- Samson - Storm 1566
- Hannibal - Storm 1566
- Fortuna 80 guns
- Prindse-Bark 64 guns
- Samson 62 guns
- Josaphat 52 guns
- Josua 48 guns
- Drage 42 guns
- Trefoldighed 48 guns
- Tre Løver 46 guns - Captured by Sweden 1644 and renamed Tre Lejon
- Spes 38-66 (c. 1612) - BU 1673
- Patienta 48 (c. 1616) - Captured by Sweden 1644
- St Sophia 40 (c. 1624) - Wrecked in storm 1645
- Oldenborg 32-42 (c. 1628) - Captured by Sweden 1644
- Hannibal 44 guns
- Viktoria 48 guns
- Frederik 86 guns
- Sofia Amalia 86 guns
- Prinds Kristian
- Norske Løve 44 guns
- Tre Kroner 42 guns
- Sorte Rytter 40 guns
- Trefoldighed 66 guns
- Lindorm 46 guns
- København 32 guns - Rearmed to 50 guns, scuttled 1676
- Tre Løver 60 guns
- Nelleblad 46 guns
- Norske Løve 86 guns - Wrecked 1666
- Tre Kroner 74 guns
- Oldenborg 47 guns?/48 guns
- Slesvig 52 guns - Renamed Kurprinds
- Prins Jørgen 52 guns
- Delmenhorst 46 guns - Scuttled as part of Provesteen battery, 1713
- Gyldenløve 36 guns - Rearmed to 56 guns, captured by Britain but released, 1694
- Prinds Georg 80 guns - Scuttled as part of Trekroner battery, 1713
- Charlotta Amalia 54 guns - Scuttled as part of Trekroner battery, 1713
- Christianus V 86 guns
- Anna Sofia 60 guns
- Churprinds 76 guns
- Nelleblad? 56 guns
- Christiania 54 guns
- Fredericus Tertius (1673) 60 guns
- Enighed 62 guns - Scuttled 1679
- Neptunus 42 guns
- Norske Løve 84 guns - Sank 1679
- Flyvende Hjort 44 guns
- Elephanten 84 guns
- Prinds Frederik 84 guns
- Tre Kroner 84 (c. 1664) - Scuttled as part of Trekroner battery, 1713
- Christianus IV 50-64 (c. 1672) - Scuttled as part of Provesteen battery, 1719
- Tomler 52 (c. 1682) - Scuttled as part of Provesteen battery, 1723
- Sværdfisk 52 (c. 1682) - Scuttled as part of Provesteen battery, 1723
- Slesvig 50/52 (c. 1684) - Storm 1711
- Dannebroge 94 (c. 1692) - Blew up 1710
- Tre Løver 78 guns
- Prinds Christian 76 guns
- Sophia Hedevig 76 guns
- Dronning Louisa 70 guns
- Prinds Carl 54 guns
- Prinds Wilhelm 54 guns
- Oldenborg 52 guns
- Fredericus IV 110 guns
- Justitia 90 guns (1707)
- Haffru 70 guns
- Beskjermer 64 guns
- Ebenetzer 64 guns
- Ditmarsken 50 guns
- Laaland 50 guns
- Dronning Anna Sophia 90 guns
- Tre Løver 60 (c. 1730)
- Prinsesse Charlotte Amalia 60 (c. 1731)
- Prinsesse Louise 60 (c. 1731) - Discarded 1771?
- Markgrevinde Sophia Christina 60 (c. 1732) - Discarded 1753?/56?
- Christianus VI 90 (c. 1733) - Discarded 1769?
- (Nye) Delmenhorst 50 (c. 1735) - Discarded 1777?
- Jylland 70 (c. 1739) - Discarded 1761? (not to be confused with the frigate "Jylland", c. 1801, present day museum)
- Wenden 70/72 (c. 1742)
- Kjøbenhavn 70 (c. 1744)
- Fyen 50/52 (c. 1746)
- Island 50/60 (c. 1751)
- Stormar 60 (c. 1751)
- Dronning Juliane Marie 70 (c. 1752) - Discarded 1788?
- Fredericus V 90 (c. 1753) - Discarded 1775?
- Sejer 60 (c. 1754)
- Grønland 50 (c. 1756)
- Kronprintz 70 (c. 1756)
- Dannemark 70 (c. 1757)
- Ebenetzer 50 (c. 1758)
- St Croix 50 (c. 1758)
- Mars 50 (c. 1760)
- Jylland 70 (1762)
- Norske Løve 70 (c. 1765)
- Slesvig 50 (c. 1767)
- Christian VII 90 (1767)
- Øresund 60 (1768)
- Prindsesse Vilhelmine Caroline 60 (1769)
- Elefanten 70 (1774)- discarded 1802
- Holsteen 60 (c. 1775)- captured by Royal Navy, Battle of Copenhagen 1801. Recommissioned as HMS Holstein 1802, renamed HMS Nassau 1805.
- Dannebroge 60 (1773)- sunk, Battle of Copenhagen 1801
- Wagrien 64 (1774)- sunk, Battle of Copenhagen 1801
- Prindsesse Sophia Frederica 74 (1779) - captured by the British 1807
- Justitia 74 (1780) - captured by the British 1807
- Oldenburg 60-64 (c. 1779) - Discarded 1799?
- Ditmarsken 64 (c. 1780) - Captured and destroyed by the British, 1807
- Arveprinds Frederich 74 (1788) - captured by the British, 1807
- Princess Louisa Augusta 64 (c. 1783) - Discarded 1829?
- Kronprins Frederich 74 (1786) - captured by the British, 1807
- Mars 64 (c. 1789) - captured and destroyed by the British, 1807
- Nordstiernen 74 (c. 1788) - discarded 1805
- Indfødsretten 64 (1787) - sunk, Battle of Copenhagen, 1801
- Fyen 74 (1787) - captured by the British, 1807
- Sjælland 74 (1791) - sunk, Battle of Copenhagen, 1801
- Odin 74 (1791) - captured by the British, 1807
- Neptunus 80 (1791) - Captured by Britain, aground and burnt 1807
- Tre Kroner 74 (1789) - Captured by Britain 1807
- Kronprindsesse Maria 70-74 (1791) - Captured by Britain 1807
- Skjold 70 (1796) - Captured by Britain 1807
- Dannemark 74 (1799) - Captured by Britain 1807
- Sejeren 64 (1800) - Captured by Britain 1807
- Waldemar 84 (1800) - Captured by Britain 1807
- Norge 72 (1801) - Captured by Britain 1807
- Christian VII 90 (1805) - Captured by Britain 1807
- Prinds Christian Frederik 74 (1806) - destroyed and burned, Battle of Sjællands Odde 1808
- Prindsesse Caroline 74 (1805) - Captured by Britain 1807
- (3 battleships) 74 guns - Not launched; captured and destroyed by the British, 1807
- Phoenix 60 (1811) - Discarded 1834
- Danmark 66 (1818) - Discarded 1856
- Dronning Marie 84 (1825) - Discarded 1862
- Waldemar 94 (1830) - Discarded 1864
- Frederik VI 94 (1832) - Discarded 1872
- Skjold 94 guns (1836) - Discarded 1873
- Christian VIII 84 (1841) - destroyed by coastal artillery, Eckernförde, 1849
- Dannebrog 82 guns (1853) - Rebuilt 1863 as 16-gun armored frigate, discarded 1897

== Steam battleships (ironclads) ==
- Dannebrog (1863)
- Rolf Krake (1863)
- Peder Skram (1864)
- Danmark (1864)
- Lindormen (1868)
- Gorm (1870)
- Odin (1872)
- Helgoland (1878)
- Tordenskjold (torpedo ram) 1880

== Coastal defence ships ==
- Iver Hvitfeldt (1886)
- Skjold (1896)
- Herluf Trolle class
  - Herluf Trolle (1899)
  - Olfert Fischer (1903)
- Peder Skram (1908) BU, 1949
- Niels Juel (1918) Sunk, 1945

== See also ==
- List of Danish sail frigates
- List of Danish ships captured at Battle of Copenhagen

== Bibliography ==
- Campbell, N. J. M. (1979). "Denmark". In Chesneau, Roger & Kolesnik, Eugene M. (eds.). Conway's All the World's Fighting Ships 1860–1905. London: Conway Maritime Press. pp. 364–368. ISBN 978-0-85177-133-5.
