= USS Tristram Shandy =

Gunboat of the United States Navy

History

United States
- Namesake: Tristram Shandy
- Launched: 1864
- Acquired: 1864
- Commissioned: 12 August 1864
- Decommissioned: 21 June 1865
- Out of service: 1 September 1868
- Captured: by Union Navy forces; 15 May 1864
- Fate: Sold, 1 September 1868

General characteristics
- Displacement: 444 tons
- Length: 222 ft (68 m)
- Beam: 23 ft 6 in (7.16 m)
- Draft: 6 ft 4 in (1.93 m)
- Propulsion: steam engine; side wheel-propelled
- Speed: 12 knots (22 km/h; 14 mph)
- Armament: three 12-pounder guns; one 20-pounder Parrott rifle

USS Tristram Shandy was a 444-ton steamer and blockade runner captured by the Union Navy during the American Civil War.

With her Parrott rifle installed, she was used by the Navy as a gunboat to patrol navigable waterways of the Confederate States of America to prevent the South from trading with other countries.

== Service history ==
=== Confederate Navy ===
Tristram Shandy took her name from the hero—and the shortened title—of the novel, The Life and Opinions of Tristram Shandy, Gentleman, which was written by Laurence Sterne between the years 1759 and 1767. She was a schooner-rigged, iron-hulled sidewheel steamer completed in 1864 at Greenock, Scotland. She was originally owned by Matthew Isaac Wilson, a Liverpool, England, merchant. The ship subsequently sailed for the Bahamas, whence she took part in British efforts to continue trade with Southern states during the American Civil War. On her first attempt to run the Federal blockade, Tristram Shandy outdistanced a Union pursuer by dumping cargo overboard to gain a few more knots of speed. After reaching Wilmington, North Carolina, she returned to Nassau, Bahamas, to pick up another cargo earmarked for the Confederate States of America. Successfully slipping through the blockade, she unloaded at Wilmington and took on board a valuable cargo of cotton, turpentine, and tobacco. In addition, $50,000 in Confederate specie reposed in the ship's safe.

On 15 May 1864, the steamer attempted to slip to sea under the protective covering of a rain squall. The ship was darkened to avoid detection by roving Union patrols, but her funnels suddenly commenced throwing highly visible flames. Union gunboat USS Kansas spotted the telltale light and gave chase. For two hours, Kansas pursued and slowly gained on the fleeing blockade runner. Meanwhile, Tristram Shandy's master frantically called down for more steam. The fugitive steamer's engineer zealously carried out the orders from the bridge until a valve failure stopped her engine. Slowly, the blockade runner lost way and lay dead in the water, an easy prey for Union sailors. A boarding party from Kansas rigged a towline to the prize, and the blockader towed her to Beaufort, North Carolina. The erstwhile blockade runner was then taken to Massachusetts where the Navy purchased her from the Boston, Massachusetts, Prize Court.

=== Union Navy ===
Repaired and converted to a gunboat at the Boston Navy Yard, the ship proceeded to Hampton Roads, Virginia, where she was commissioned on 12 August 1864, Acting Vol. Lt. Edward F. Devens in command. Eleven days later, the ship arrived off Wilmington on 23 August and began duty as a blockader. On 7 September, her lookout sighted a strange ship. However, the distance between the two ships was too great, and the quarry slipped away. Her next chance came on 31 October when she joined USS Santiago de Cuba and USS Mount Vernon in pursuing a blockade runner which escaped after a three-hour chase. On 3 December 1864, a blockade runner, whose name could not be determined, ran aground off the western bar at Wilmington, at Marshall Shoals. Although within range of Fort Fisher's guns, Tristram Shandy closed the disabled blockade runner to destroy her before she could be salvaged by Southern forces. Commencing fire with her Parrott rifle and her 3-pounders, the Union gunboat soon reduced the grounded runner to a blazing wreck, down by the bow and sinking from numerous hits. Meanwhile, Confederate batteries opened fire on the gunboat, and several Southern shells splashed close alongside. Through skillful maneuvering by her commanding officer, Tristram Shandy emerged unscathed, as she kept behind the clouds of smoke from her own guns and thus confused the Confederate lookouts spotting for the fort's heavy rifles.

On Christmas Eve, in an attempt to take Fort Fisher and thus close the Confederacy's last major seaport, Rear Admiral David D. Porter deployed a large fleet of gunboats, ironclads, and transports off the fort and commenced laying down a heavy shore bombardment. Army forces slated to take part in the operation, under General Benjamin Franklin Butler, arrived from northward too late to commence operations on the first day. Ill feeling resulted between Butler and Porter, with the former officer returning to Washington, D.C., and the operation temporarily shelved. After participating in the initial December bombardments of Fort Fisher, Tristram Shandy took part in the second assault which commenced on Friday, 13 January 1865. A frontal assault by sailors and marines drawn from landing forces in the Fleet suffered disastrously as fusillades of gunfire from Confederate sharpshooters and cannoneers swept them down as wheat before a scythe. Meanwhile, Union Army forces attacked from the landward side, storming the fort's relatively undefended rear. By 15 January, Fisher was secured in Union hands, and the last barrier to Wilmington was removed, enabling the Union to stop the flow of supplies through the Confederacy's last seaport. Tristram Shandy resumed patrol operations off Wilmington; and, on 25 January 1865, she captured blockade runner Blenheim. The runner's captain and crew had not received the news of the fall of Fort Fisher and anchored off Mound Battery. He thus fell prey to Union sailors from the gunboat, who boarded Blenheim, and captured her easily.

On 31 January, Tristram Shandy joined the East Gulf Blockading Squadron and remained with that group into the spring. Returning north, she served as a dispatch vessel with Union forces operating in Hampton Roads, Virginia. Admiral Porter embarked in Tristram Shandy on 14 April, after the admiral had previously escorted President Abraham Lincoln on a tour of the devastated fallen Confederate capital of Richmond, Virginia. Two days later, the ship moored at Baltimore, Maryland, where the admiral was greeted with the sad news that the President had been assassinated the previous night in Washington. On 26 April, the ship returned to Hampton Roads to continue her duties as a dispatch vessel, operating off the Virginia Capes, concurrently serving as a lookout and keeping watch for the Confederate ram CSS Stonewall, believed to be still at sea and unaware that hostilities had ceased. Tristram Shandy then conveyed Confederate prisoners of war to Fort Pulaski, Georgia, in late May and returned to Hampton Roads on 2 June. Upon arrival, she was assigned to duty as a roving vessel operating under the direct orders of the Commander of the North Atlantic Squadron, for his use in inspecting the various ships and stations under his command.

On 12 June 1865, her name was changed to Boxer. Her service as a warship finished, Boxer was laid up at Philadelphia, Pennsylvania, in the late summer of 1865. She remained in reserve until sold on 1 September 1868 to J. N. Middleton, of Philadelphia, who renamed her Firefly. The erstwhile blockade runner and gunboat operated subsequently in mercantile service under a succession of owners until she ran aground off Havana, Cuba, and was declared a total loss in 1874.

== See also ==
- Blockade runners of the American Civil War
- Blockade mail of the Confederacy
- Captured ships of the American Civil War

== Bibliography ==
- Daniels, Secretary of the Navy, Josephus; Marsh, Captain, U.S.Navy, retired, C.C. (1921). Official records of the Union and Confederate navies in the War of the Rebellion.
  Government Printing Office, United States. Naval War Records Office, United States.
  Office of Naval Records and Library. p. 276. ISBN 1-58218-556-5. Url
