= HMS Detroit (1812) =

Brig of the Provincial Marine

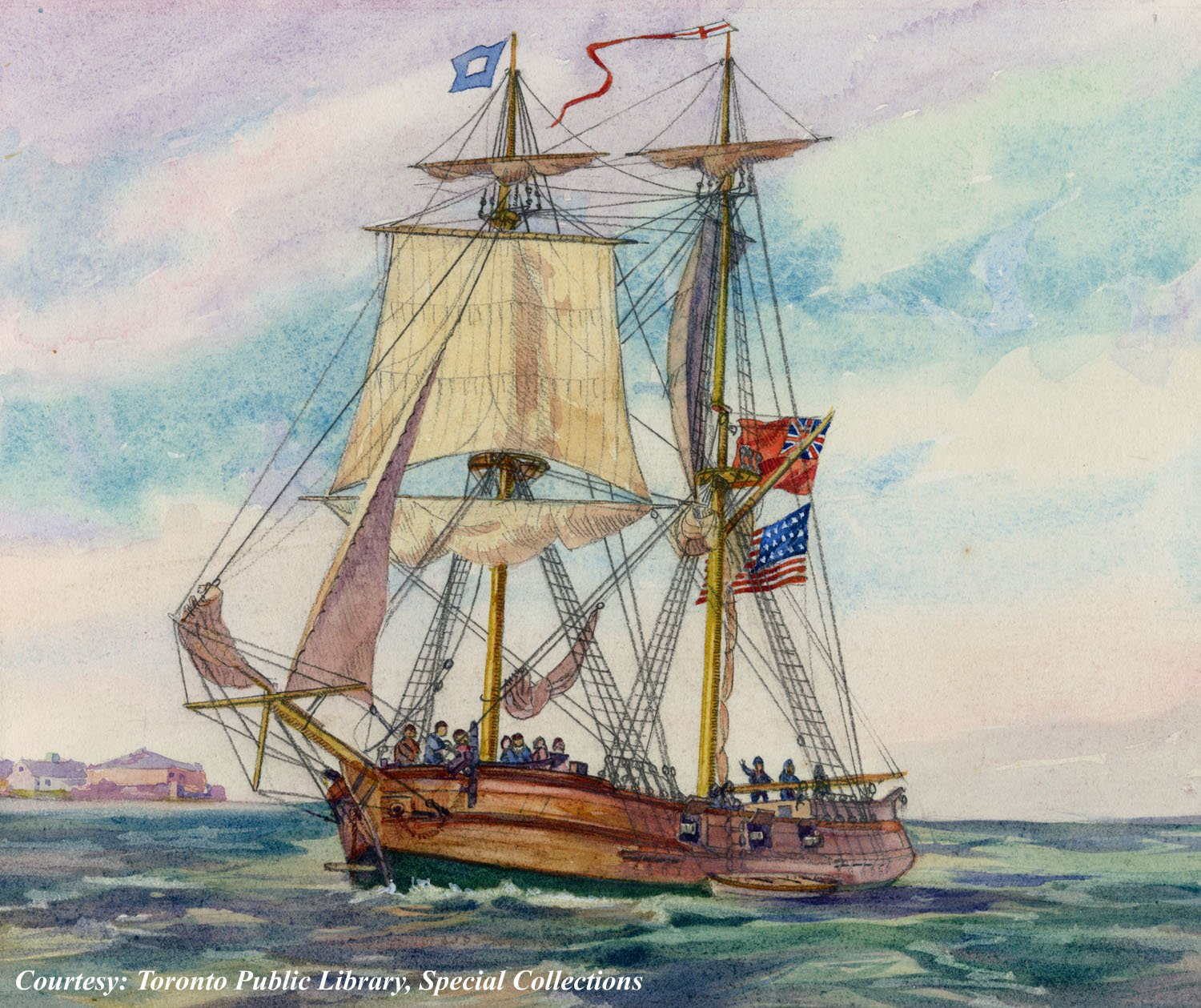
- Adams in August 1812 shortly after she was captured by British forces at the siege of Detroit

History

United States
- Name: Adams
- Builder: River Rouge Military Shipyard
- Laid down: 1798
- Launched: 18 May 1799
- Fate: Captured on 16 August 1812

United Kingdom
- Name: Detroit
- Acquired: Captured on 16 August 1812
- Fate: Captured and burnt on 9 October 1812

General characteristics
- Type: 6-gun brig
- Tons burthen: 125
- Sail plan: brig
- Armament: 6 × 6-pounder guns

HMS Detroit was a 6-gun brig of the Provincial Marine. She was launched in 1798 as the American vessel Adams. During the War of 1812 British forces captured her in August 1812 at the siege of Detroit and commissioned her into the Provincial Marine as Detroit. She proceeded to assist other British forces in gaining control of Lake Erie. An American cutting out party recaptured her in October but she immediately grounded and came under heavy British fire. Her captors set the ship on fire before abandoning the vessel, which burnt to the waterline.

== Description and construction ==
Shortly after General Anthony Wayne took control of Detroit in 1796, a ship was ordered for construction by the United States Army. Construction of the 125-tons burthen vessel at the United States Shipyard on the River Rouge (at Baby Creek near what is now Woodmere Cemetery) began in 1797. Some accounts of the vessel indicate that the process of salting for preservation of the wood used in the construction was utilized aboard Adams. However, the process was done incorrectly and in a refit performed ten years after the brig's construction, it was found that the salt had been packed too tightly and had not dissolved into the wood, and remained hard and dry between the frames. The United States Army intended to use Adams as a transport vessel carrying supplies between American outposts on the upper Great Lakes including Fort Mackinac on Lake Huron. The vessel was also used to carry private cargo.

== Service history ==
By the beginning of the War of 1812, Adams was the only American government vessel of any kind on the upper Great Lakes. Adams was armed with six 6-pounder (3 kg) cannon and operated out of Detroit. (Note: Symonds claims Adams was armed with 14 guns in American service.) On 16 August 1812, General William Hull surrendered Detroit after a siege by British forces. Adams, which had been at Detroit, was surrendered too, and was taken into Provincial Marine service and renamed Detroit. The brig was added to the Provincial Marine's Lake Erie squadron. However, Detroit's British service was short lived.

On 8 October, Detroit, with the North West Company brig Caledonia, was anchored off Fort Erie. Lieutenant Jesse Elliott, commander of the United States Navy forces on Lake Erie, spotted the vessels and commanded a cutting out operation to capture both brigs. The American cutting out force, comprising 100 men, departed Buffalo Creek and approached the British vessels in darkness. Elliott's force successfully captured both vessels and the Americans made for safe harbour at Black Rock. Caledonia arrived safely, but Detroit ran aground on the southern tip of Squaw Island after the wind had died and the vessel became unmanageable, while under fire from British artillery. The British sent a force to retake the ship, but Elliott's crew beat off the attack. In order to prevent the brig's recapture, Elliott ordered the ship burned.

== See also ==
- Bibliography of 18th–19th century Royal Naval history
- List of ships captured in the 19th century
