= St Helena (1814 ship) =

Schooner of the British East India Company

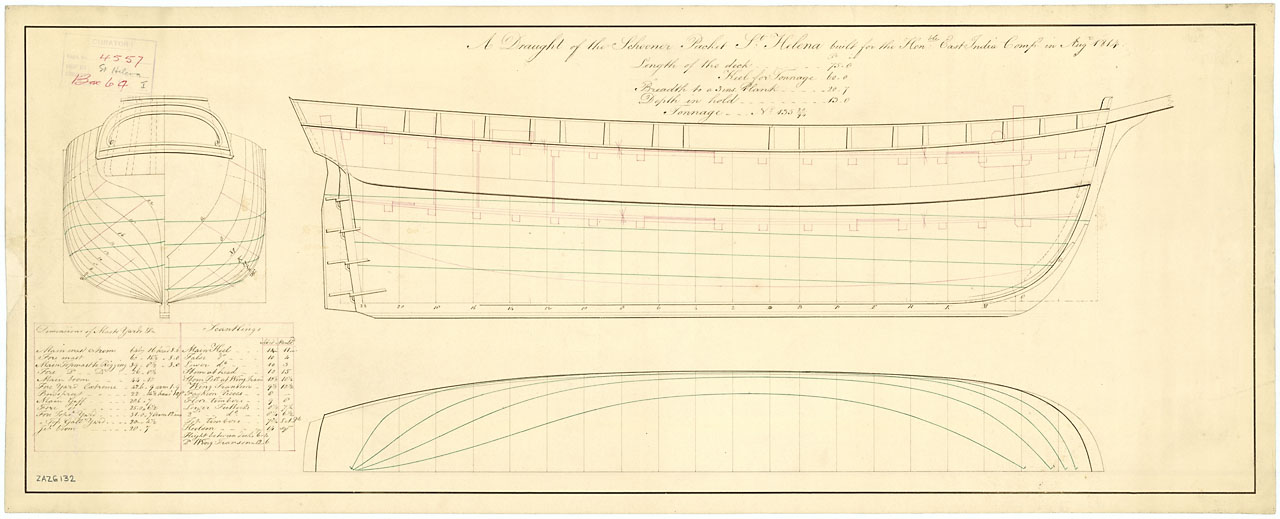
- Plan of the East India Company packet schooner St Helena

History

British
- Name: St Helena
- Builder: Wigram & Green, Blackwall
- Launched: 1 August 1814
- Fate: Captured / reclaimed 1830; Sold 1831

British
- Name: St Helena
- Acquired: By purchase 1832
- Fate: Wrecked 1851

General characteristics
- Type: Schooner
- Tons burthen: 13628/94 (bm); Per plan, the burthen is 135 29/94
- Length: 75 ft 7 3/4 in (23.1 m) (overall); 60 ft 0 in (18.3 m) (keel)
- Beam: 20 ft 8 in (6.3 m)
- Depth of hold: 6 ft 6 in (2.0 m)
- Sail plan: Schooner
- Armament: 4 × 12-pounder carronades (1830)

St Helena was a schooner, launched in 1814, that the British East India Company (EIC), used as a packet ship, sailing between Saint Helena and the Cape of Good Hope. She did two tours of duty at St Helena, from 1814 to 1821, and again from 1822 to 1830, carrying, cattle, grain and stores to St Helena. While there she made regular voyages to the Cape. On her way home in 1830, a pirate captured her, killing most of the crew. The survivors were nevertheless able to get her to Sierra Leone. A group of officers and men from the Royal Navy then sailed her for England, only to be arrested and detained by the Portuguese navy as pirates. She was sold in 1831 to commercial interests and returned to Cape Town. She served there until she was wrecked in September 1851.

== Design ==
St Helena was an early example of a schooner-brigantine. Construction cost £21 per ton. Originally, she was intended to be a topgallant-yard schooner, but later she received a topgallant mast.

== St Helena station ==
=== First tour of duty ===
Under the command of Captain John Augustus Atkinson she left The Downs on 29 October 1814. On 12 January 1815 St Helena arrived at St Helena and Atkinson put her at the disposal of the government.

Thereafter she attended East Indiamen visiting the island and made some at more than 18 or so voyages, almost all to the Cape, though two were to Benguela and Angra Pequeña. On the trip to Benguela she brought back bullocks. On other trips she brought wine, sheep and supplies, to the island.

On 11 August 1819, St Helena grounded in the bay at Cape Town. She floated off, but drifted into the schooner Uitenhage, with minor damage. On 8 September she sailed for St Helena with a cargo of 134 sheep and four horses; the trip took 12 days. A later voyage saw her carrying 128 sheep and 17 bullocks.

St Helena left St Helena on 21 September 1821 and arrived on 5 November at the Downs. She had carried, in addition to her crew of 14 men, 23 soldiers, eight women, 19 children, and a woman and her child as passengers.

=== Second tour of duty ===
Captain James Fairfax was her captain for her second tour of duty at St Helena. He sailed from the Downs on 22 May 1822. She continued her prior duties of sailing between the St Helena and the Cape, apparently making some five trips per year. She also on occasion sailed as far as Mauritius and Rio de Janeiro.

In late 1828 or early 1829, Fairfax returned to Britain on leave of absence, leaving St Helena under the command of her first officer, Mr. Benjamin L. Harrison. The Court of Directors of the EIC ordered her home for repairs, and she departed on 30 March 1830. She was carrying a crew of 18 or 19 men (accounts differ), including four Kroomen, and one passenger, a Mr. Waddell, an assistant surgeon from the artillery who was returning due to worsening problems with his eyes.

Before St Helena left, Harrison agreed to carry a letter to Sierra Leone which represented a deviation from the most direct route back to Britain, at the request of Commodore Francis Augustus Collier, the commander of the anti-slavery West Africa Squadron, on the frigate HMS Sybille. Sybille was to meet the squadron at Sierra Leone, but had yellow fever aboard, and the surgeon had recommended that she transfer to cooler climes. Collier's letter instructed the squadron to meet him as Ascension Island.

== Capture ==
Harrison and St Helena sailed on 31 March. On 6 April, in the Gulf of Guinea (1°40' South by 9°50' West), she encountered a large felucca under French colours. The felucca ordered St Helena to heave to. The felucca sent over a boat with six men, and ordered Harrison to come to the felucca to present his papers. The felucca's men stayed on St Helena, while he and four men rowed over to the felucca. Accounts differ as to whether more men came over from the felucca. After Harrison returned, the men from the felucca demanded all the money on board. When Harrison refused to give it to them, they tied him and Waddell together, ran them through with a cutlass, and threw them overboard. The men from the felucca then killed 11 more crewmen. The steward and carpenter surrendered the money, some £1176 in copper coins, stored in 35 casks, before fleeing below decks where they hid, as did three or four other crew men. The felucca's men left the St Helena, but they returned an hour later to cut away her two masts and to scuttle her. They failed in their scuttling, so the felucca then sailed around St Helena, firing on her with a 9-pounder. Towards evening the felucca sailed away. Eventually, the survivors came on deck and used some spars to jury-rig St Helena. They sailed for Sierra Leone, which they reached late in the evening on 1 May or the next day.

From the survivors' description, the felucca was identified as the Daspegado, of and from Barcelona, with a crew of some 34 men of mixed nationality, all under the command of Don Antonio Canstanti (or Constanti). She was armed with one 9-pounder gun amidships. Sybille had intercepted her on 29 December, but had had no cause at the time to detain her. Daspegado was of 50 tons and was bound for St Thomas but had no cargo aboard.

Captain Alexander Gordon of Atholl dispatched a vessel to St Helena to advise them of the situation and dispatched several other vessels to find Daspegado. HMS Primrose was successful, capturing Daspegado and her crew. There are no readily available records of their disposition. The casks of coins were also recovered.

The various accounts of the attack cited above exhibit numerous inconsistencies, and several express puzzlement concerning why Harrison had let the pirates on board and why his crew had not resisted more effectively. The most coherent account reports that Harrison did not believe that he could out-fight the pirates, and that he told his crew, "Civility will be best; we will give them what they want, and they will spare our lives."

== Detainment ==
The Royal Navy quickly repaired St Helena, and on 16 May 1830 she sailed for Britain under the command of Lieutenant William Smith Warren, with 11 passengers consisting of officers and men of the West Africa Squadron being invalided home. Warren was on half-pay and as she was not a naval vessel, did not wear a uniform.

On 16 July as they approached Terceira, they saw two vessel, to which they steered in order to speak with them. One, a brig of war, not bearing any flag, fired on them, and the other, which turned out to be the Portuguese frigate Diana, sent over a boarding party which disarmed the men on St Helena, then took it over and took Warren and the other men to the frigate. Diana's captain, Commodore Francisco Ignacio de Miranda Everard, ignored all the documents Warren provided, including the letter from Warren appointing him to the schooner and charging him with sailing her back to Britain. de Miranda Everard obdurately insisted the Warren was a pirate.

The evidence for the charge was that the Warren did not have a uniform, that the vessel was armed with four cannon and carried small arms, and that several of crew recognized St Helena as a former privateer that had captured several Brazilian vessels and that they had seen her at Rio de Janeiro. Furthermore, there were issues with some of her documents.

Diana then accompanied St Helena to St Michaels in the Azores. There the British Consul-General succeeded, with difficulty, in getting access to Warren. Despite his remonstrations disproving or countering the Portuguese captain's assertions, the consul was unable to secure the release of the vessel or her crew and passengers. The Portuguese at this time changed the charge, arguing that St Helena was running the blockade of Terceira that Diana and her consort were enforcing. (At the time, Terceira was under the control of a junta that was in rebellion against the government in Lisbon.)

Diana then escorted to Lisbon St Helena, her crew and passengers still prisoners aboard the frigate, as well as two British merchant vessels and an American schooner that the frigate had also seized. At Lisbon the British Consul-General was eventually able to secure her release and she sailed on 24 August. The Consul-General was also able to secure the release of the other vessels some time later. He was not able to get the Portuguese to discipline the captain of the Diana or any of the other Portuguese officers who had behaved badly towards the seamen concerned, or the British Consuls-General. King Miguel finally did dismiss Commodore de Miranda Everard from the Portuguese navy on 23 April 1831.

== Later career and fate ==
The EIC sold St Helena to Captain W. Tayt, of London. On 28 June 1832 he sold her to Smith & Co., of Cape Town, for the South African coastal trade. On 11 November 1843 she sailed from the Cape of Good Hope with passengers for South Australia. She arrived at Port Adelaide on 3 January 1844.

St Helena disappeared from Lloyds Register in 1844, but she continued to sail.

St Helena was under the command of Captain J. Lewis when she was wrecked on 13 September 1851 during a south-east gale in Plettenberg Bay, South Africa. Apparently there were no deaths.

== See also ==
- List of schooners
- List of ships captured in the 19th century
- Glossary of nautical terms (A-L)
- Glossary of nautical terms (M-Z)
