= USS A. J. View =

Collier of the United States Navy

History
- Name: USS A. J. View
- Acquired: 28 July 1863
- In service: circa 28 July 1863
- Captured: by Union Navy forces, 28 November 1861

General characteristics
- Propulsion: Schooner sail

USS A. J. View – a Confederate States of America schooner – was captured during the beginning of the American Civil War by the Union Navy.

A. J. View was outfitted as a collier, supplying coal to Union ships with steam engines. Her record of activity is sparse.

== Service history ==
Early in the afternoon of 28 November 1861, while cruising in Mississippi Sound, the Union screw steamer USS R. R. Cuyler, Commander, C. H. B. Caldwell, fell in with and seized A. J. View (along with steamer CSS Henry Lewis) off Pascagoula, Mississippi, as that Biloxi, Mississippi schooner attempted to slip out to sea. The prize's cargo was unloaded at Ship Island, Mississippi, and the schooner herself may have been used for sometime thereafter by the Gulf Blockading Squadron. At some later date, after she had sailed north for adjudication, A. J. View was finally condemned by the admiralty court at New York City and was sold to the Navy on 28 July 1863 – almost two years after she had been captured. She was used as a coal hulk, but no record of the place or places where she performed this service has been found.

== Bibliography ==
- Wyllie, Arthur (2006). The Union Navy. Simor and Schuster Inc., New York, 2006. p. 6. ISBN 978-1-4303-2117-0. Url1
