= List of Italian sailing frigates =

This is a list of Italian sail frigates of the period 1640–1840:

Venice:

- Cavalier Angelo
- Pallade
- Venere
- Minerva - Wrecked c. 1792
- Brillante 40? - Captured by France 1797 and renamed Montenotte, BU c. 1801
- Bellona - Captured by Austria 1798
- Medusa 40? - Captured by France 1797 and renamed Leoben, captured by Britain 1801
- ? - Captured by France 1797, renamed Muiron
- Carrère - Captured by France 1797
- Palma 40? - Captured by France 1797 and renamed Lonato
- Cerere 40? - Captured by France 1797 and renamed Mantoue, captured by Turkey 1801
- (6 frigates) - Captured and scuttled by France, 1797
- Bellona 32 - Captured by Britain in the Battle of Lissa, 1811, and renamed Dover
- Corona 40 - Captured by Britain in the Battle of Lissa, 1811, and renamed Daedalus
- Carolina 32 - Took part in the Battle of Lissa, 1811

Naples:

- Pallade 40 - Scuttled 1799
- Minerva 40
- Sibilla 40
- Sirena 40
- Aretusa 40
- Leone (?)
- Partenope 36 (1834)
- Regina 50 (1840)

Sardinia:

- San Michele 66 (1841)

== Bibliography ==
- Winfield, Rif and Roberts, Stephen S. (2015) French Warships in the Age of Sail 1786-1861: Design, Construction, Careers and Fates. Seaforth Publishing. ISBN 978-1-84832-204-2
