= Action of 25 November 1804 =

- Part of the Napoleonic Wars
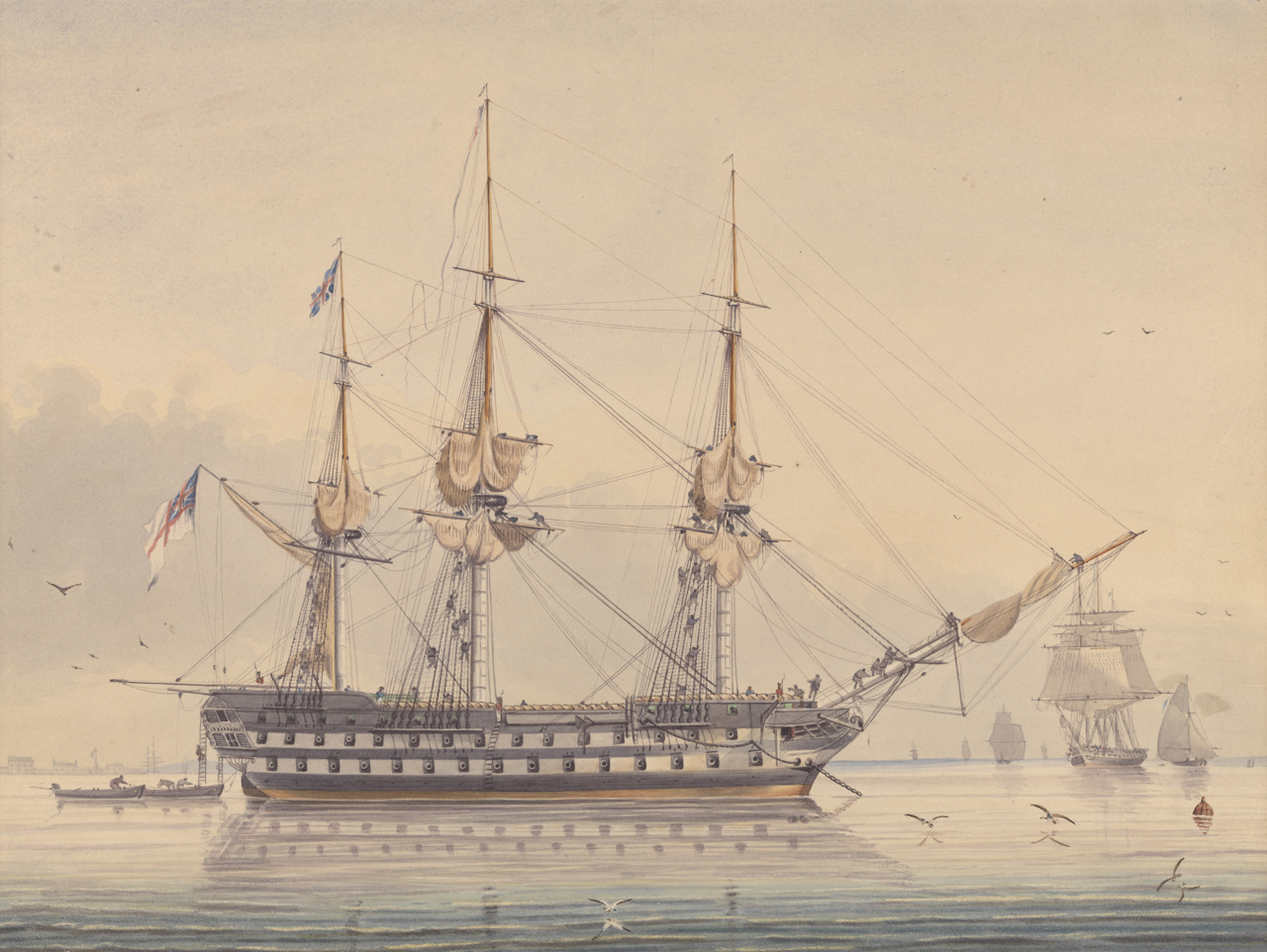
- HMS Donegal, depicted 36 years after the action
Date	25 November 1804
Location	Off Cádiz, Atlantic Ocean
Result	British victory

Belligerents
United Kingdom	Spain

Commanders and leaders
Richard Strachan	Unknown

Strength
1 ship of the line	1 frigate

Casualties and losses
Unknown	380 captured 1 frigate captured

The action of 25 November 1804 was a minor naval engagement that took place off Cádiz early in the Napoleonic Wars between the Royal Navy and Spanish Navy. The battle ended with the capture of the Spanish frigate Amfitrite by HMS Donegal.

== History ==
HMS Donegal had spent 1800 in Plymouth, and in 1801 came under the command of Captain Sir Richard Strachan. Donegal was initially deployed in the English Channel, but following the outbreak of hostilities with Spain, she was assigned to watch the French squadron off Spain which was in Cádiz. Whilst on this station, she spotted and gave chase to the large 42-gun Spanish frigate Amfitrite on the morning of 24 November 1804.

After pursuing her for 46 hours, Amfitrite lost her mizzen-top-mast and Donegal subsequently overhauled her. Donegal dispatched a boat that brought the Spanish captain aboard. Sir Richard did not speak Spanish and the captain did not speak English, so it was with difficulty that Sir Richard attempted to inform him that his orders were to return the Amfitrite back to Cádiz. Sir Richard allowed the captain three minutes to decide whether he would comply with the order, but after waiting for six minutes without an answer, opened fire on Amfitrite. The engagement lasted only eight minutes, and resulted in a number of deaths, including the first Spanish captain, who fell to a musket ball.

Amfitrite surrendered and after being searched, was found to be laden with stores and carrying dispatches from Cádiz to Tenerife and Havana. She was taken over and later commissioned into the Navy as HMS Amfitrite.

Donegal would later make another capture off Cadiz, taking a Spanish vessel carrying a cargo reputed to be worth 200,000 pounds.
