= USS Mount Vernon (1859) =

Gunboat of the United States Navy

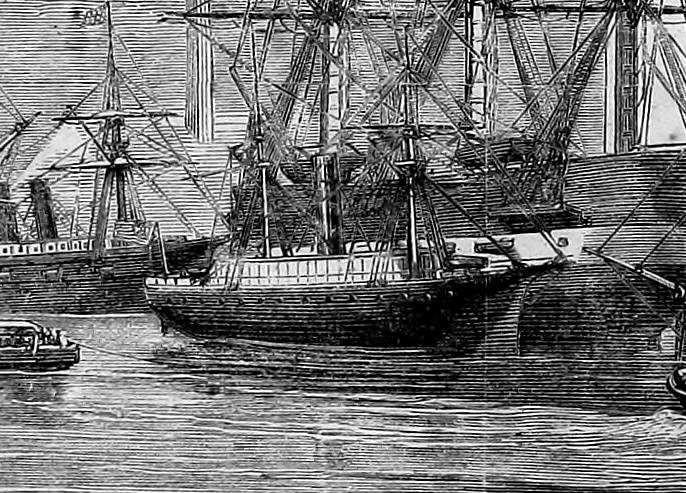
- USS Mount Vernon at the Brooklyn Navy Yard, June 1861

History

United States
- Name: USS Mount Vernon
- Laid down: 1859
- Acquired: by purchase, 12 September 1861
- Commissioned: 1861
- Decommissioned: 27 June 1865
- Fate: Sold, 12 July 1865

General characteristics
- Type: Steamer
- Displacement: 625 long tons (635 t)
- Length: 175 ft 7 in (53.52 m)
- Beam: 22 ft 6 in (6.86 m)
- Draft: 14 ft (4.3 m)
- Propulsion: Steam engine
- Speed: 12 knots (22 km/h; 14 mph)
- Armament: 1 × 32-pounder gun

The first USS Mount Vernon was a wooden-screw steamer in the United States Navy.

Mount Vernon was built at Brooklyn, New York, in 1859; chartered by the Navy in May 1861 for three months; purchased by the Navy at New York on 12 September 1861; and commissioned at New York, Commander Oliver S. Glisson in command.

== Service history ==
After charter, Mount Vernon convoyed two steamers and two sailing ships to the Gulf of Mexico in May. While in the gulf, she took brigantine East, suspected of communicating with Confederate-held shore territory, and towed damaged Parkersburg from Pensacola, Florida to Key West. Ordered to Fortress Monroe, Virginia, 3 July, Mount Vernon gave refuge to Unionists preparing to travel north.

From 17 July, Mount Vernon patrolled in and off the Rappahannock River, capturing sloop Wild Pigeon in an attempted escape at night 20 July. On 1 September she sailed for Mobjack Bay to relieve USS Daylight, and in November proceeded to Beaufort, North Carolina. She engaged British schooner Phantom off Cape Lookout 2 December, and on the 31st sent an armed party to aid in firing a ship being used by the Confederates as a beacon.

In continued blockade and patrol service off North Carolina, Mount Vernon took British schooners British Queen on 1 March 1862 and Mary Jane on 24 March 1863. With USS Cambridge and USS Fernandina, Mount Vernon chased Confederate schooner Kate ashore near Fort Casswell 2 April, and later in the month captured St. George.

After joining in the attack on Confederate batteries at Sewell's Point 2 May, Mount Vernon returned to blockade duty, playing a key role in the Navy's efforts to block the flow of materials from overseas and from one point to another in the Confederacy. She took Constitution 23 May, forced an unknown schooner to ground and set herself on fire 26 June, then in July took up close blockade of New Inlet and Little River Inlet. With Cambridge, in December Mount Vernon chased another schooner ashore, a feat duplicated on 12 June 1863. Mount Vernon, USS James Adger, and USS Iroquois together cut out a blockade runner on 1 August near New Inlet.

Arriving Newport News, Virginia early in 1864, Mount Vernon remained there until May 1864. She was in the group of Union ships attacked by North Carolina off the mouth of Cape Fear River in May, and she searched for Florida in July. She joined in the abortive attack on Fort Fisher 23 and 24 December, and renewed the attack in mid-January 1865.

Decommissioning at New York City on 27 June 1865, she was sold at public auction 12 July 1865.

== See also ==
- Confederate States Navy
- Union blockade
- Union Navy
