= USS James Adger =

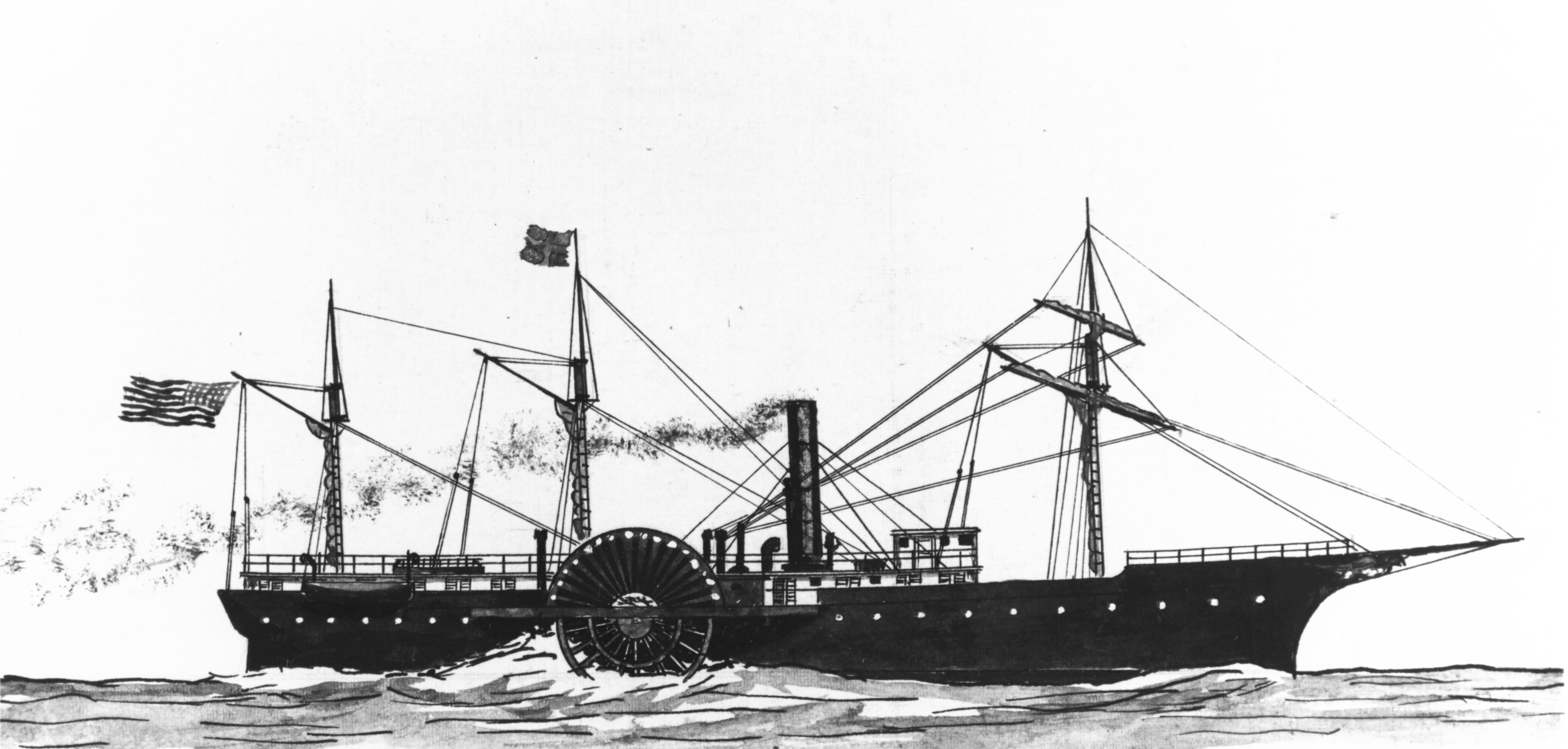
- James Adger in pre-war commercial service

History

United States
- Name: SS James Adger
- Owner: James Adger & Co.
- Route: Charleston, South Carolina – New York City
- Builder: William H. Webb
- Launched: 10 Jan 1852
- Completed: May 1852
- Fate: Seized at the outset of the Civil War, 1861

United States
- Name: USS James Adger
- Acquired: By purchase, 20 July 1861
- Commissioned: 20 September 1861
- Decommissioned: 1865
- Fate: Sold, 9 October 1866

General characteristics
- Type: Sidewheel steamer
- Tonnage: 1152 GRT
- Length: 215 ft (66 m)
- Beam: 33 ft 6 in (10.21 m)
- Depth of hold: 21 ft 3 in (6.48 m)
- Installed power: 240 hp (180 kW)
- Propulsion: 1 × side-lever engines; 2 × side-wheels
- Sail plan: Auxiliary sails
- Speed: 11 kn (13 mph; 20 km/h)
- Complement: 120 officers and enlisted
- Armament: 8 × 32-pounder guns, 1 × 20-pounder Parrott rifle

USS James Adger was a sidewheel steamer in the Union Navy during the American Civil War. She retained her former name.

Before being pressed into service by the United States Navy, the SS James Adger was a United States Mail Steamship operating between Charleston, South Carolina and New York City, New York. Owned by James Adger II (James Adger & Co) of Charleston, she was seized while in New York City at the outset of the Civil War and converted for military duty by the Union Navy. There is at least one instance in which the USS James Adger was used to transport a slave, 35-year-old "Margarette," from Charleston to New York. Her owners or shippers were Thomas P. Tainter and John Dickinson; the steamer arrived in NY on 7 July 1852 (see Slave Manifests for the Port of NY, 1822–1852, National Archives Catalog).

James Adger was built at New York City by William H. Webb in 1851–1852. Her 240 hp (180 kW) side-lever engine was supplied by the Allaire Iron Works.

James Adger was purchased at New York for the sum of $85,000 from Spofford, Tileston & Co., on 20 July 1861, and commissioned at New York Navy Yard on 20 September 1861, Commander John B. Marchand in command.

== Civil War service ==
=== The Trent Affair, 1861 ===
James Adger departed New York on 16 October 1861 in pursuit of the CSS Nashville, a Confederate cruiser reported to have escaped from Charleston, South Carolina with the South's ministers to England and France, James M. Mason and John Slidell. She arrived at Queenstown, Ireland after an extremely stormy passage in October and spent November cruising in quest of her elusive quarry. The diplomats were apprehended by San Jacinto on 8 November.

While in port, the captain of James Adger began the legal questions that would be used in the Trent Affair by loudly speaking of his mission while intoxicated on brandy. Earl Russell would hear of his mission and set the Law offices of the Crown to work deciding on the status of diplomats as a form of contraband.

=== South Atlantic Blockading Squadron, 1861-1863 ===
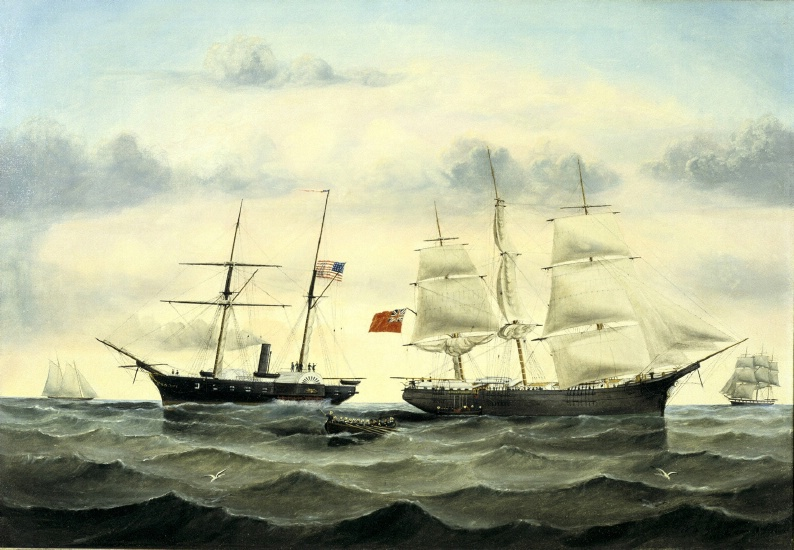
James Adger capturing Emily St. Pierre off Charleston, 18 March 1862

James Adger arrived Hampton Roads, Va. on 2 December and three days later was ordered to Port Royal, South Carolina for duty in the South Atlantic Blockading Squadron. Rear Admiral Samuel Francis Du Pont ordered Comdr. Marchand to sail in James Adger to Georgetown, S.C., and assume command of the blockade there. She arrived off Georgetown, S.C. on 24 December and served with such efficiency that on 7 March 1862, Comdr. Marchand was ordered to Charleston to command the blockade at that critical port.

At Charleston, smooth teamwork was the key to success, and James Adger was unusually adept in cooperating with other ships in the area to assure the effectiveness of the blockade. As senior ship, she usually remained on station while others chased blockade runners; from time to time, she took part in a capture herself. On 18 March, she joined four other Union ships in capturing Emily St. Pierre attempting to slip into Charleston with a cargo of 2,173 bales of gunny cloth sorely needed for baling cotton, the South's main export and source of foreign credit. She helped Keystone State on 29 May in capturing Elizabeth, a 250 long tons (250 t) steamer trying to enter Charleston with a cargo of munitions. She assisted Keystone State and Flag in driving off and pursuing her old adversary Nashville — now a blockade runner named Thomas L. Wragg — trying to slip into Charleston.

James Adger sailed for Baltimore on 19 September for repairs and departed for the South on 31 December touching at Hampton Roads on 2 January 1863 to take monitor Montauk in tow before proceeding to Beaufort and Port Royal in preparation for an attack on Charleston. Arriving Port Royal on 19 January, the ships learned that Nashville, now a privateer called Rattlesnake, was in the Ogeechee River. James Adger stood out of Port Royal, monitor Montauk in tow on 22 January and steamed to Ossabaw Sound, where she arrived two days later. Montauk ascended the Ogeechee independently to begin operations which resulted in the destruction of Rattlesnake on 28 February. Meanwhile, James Adger — her vital towing service completed — returned to Port Royal on 29 January.

On 2 April, the veteran ship became flagship for Rear Admiral Du Pont while he supervised final preparations for his powerful monitor attack upon Charleston. After the tough ironclads were driven back by incredibly intense fire from Confederate batteries, James Adger towed crippled monitors to Port Royal and on 29 April sailed from Port Royal towing Passaic north for repairs, arriving New York on 4 May.

Back in Port Royal on 16 May, James Adger was assigned blockade duty off Charleston. A month later, she was recalled to Port Royal to embark prisoners captured with Atlanta for passage to Fort Monroe, whence she steamed to Philadelphia for repairs. She arrived Philadelphia 25 June but immediately after coaling sailed in pursuit of Confederate commerce railer CSS Tacony, then operating against Union merchantmen far up the East Coast. She arrived New York on 3 July.

=== North Atlantic Blockading Squadron, 1863 ===
Four days later, James Adger — not yet repaired — received orders to Wilmington for duty with the North Atlantic Blockading Squadron. Arriving Wilmington on 27 July, she was stationed off New Inlet, where five days later she assisted Iroquois and Mount Vernon in taking Confederate steamer Kate. On 8 November, with the assistance of Niphon she captured Cornubia, an iron side wheeler bringing in a valuable cargo of arms, ammunition, and chemicals. Moreover, a package of documents thrown overboard before the capture, when plucked out of the sea, divulged information so important to the South that Cornubia's captain lamented, "though the Cornubia is a small vessel the Confederate Government could better have afforded to lose almost any other..." The next morning, James Adger took Confederate steamer Robert E. Lee coming into Wilmington from Bermuda with a cargo of arms and Army clothing sorely needed by Lee's soldiers. Schooner Ella, approaching Wilmington with a cargo of salt and yard goods from Nassau, Bahamas, was James Adger's next victim, surrendering on 26 November.

Without the normal overhaul periods due ships and men, service was taking a daily toll in wear and tear. When the ship's long postponed repairs could be delayed no longer, James Adger sailed north and decommissioned at Philadelphia on 28 December for the necessary yard work.

=== South Atlantic Blockading Squadron, Caribbean, 1864-1865 ===
After recommissioning on 17 June 1864, James Adger served in the South Atlantic Blockading Squadron until the end of the war. On 21 April 1865, Secretary Gideon Welles ordered her to Mariguana Passage (now Mayaguana Passage) in the Bahamas to escort a convoy of California-bound ships. Following a visit to New York, she cruised in the Caribbean off Panama and Colombia from August 1865-February 1866.

James Adger decommissioned at New York Navy Yard on 2 May and was sold at New York to James B. Campbell on 9 October.

James Adger was demolished on Apple Island in Boston Harbor.

As of 2005, no other ship in the United States Navy has been named James Adger.
