= List of sail frigates of Germany =

This is a list of German sail frigates:

- Mohrian (ex-Swedish)
- Kurprinz
- Deutschland 36
- Eckernförde 48 (ex-Danish Gefion, captured 1849) - BU 1891
- Thetis (ex-British (c. 1846), purchased 1855) - BU 1895
- Niobe (ex-British, purchased 1862)

== Bibliography ==
- Gröner, Erich (1990). German Warships 1815–1945. Vol. One: Major Surface Vessels (Revised and Expanded ed.). Annapolis, Maryland: Naval Institute Press. ISBN 0-87021-790-9.
