= USS R. R. Cuyler =

Gunboat of the United States Navy

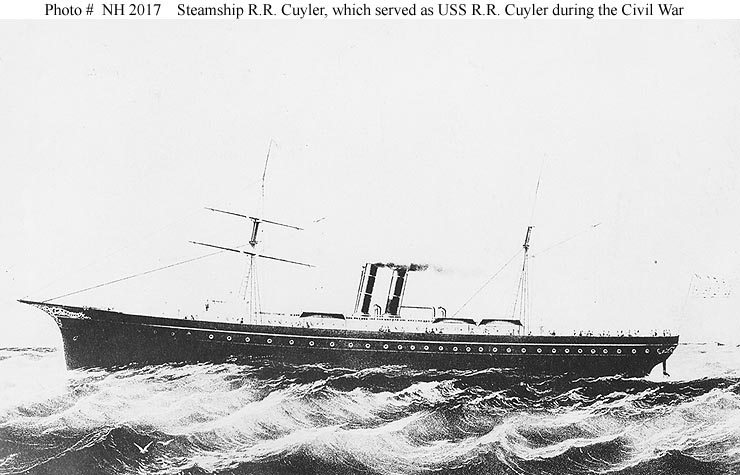
- USS R. R. Cuyler

History

United States
- Cost: $142,000
- Laid down: date unknown
- Launched: 1860, in New York
- Acquired: May 1861
- Commissioned: circa June 1861
- Decommissioned: 1 July 1865
- Stricken: est. 1865
- Fate: Sold 15 August 1865; Sunk, September 1867

General characteristics
- Displacement: 1,200 tons
- Length: 237 ft (72 m)
- Beam: 33 ft 3 in (10.13 m)
- Draught: 17 ft (5.2 m)
- Propulsion: steam engine; screw-propelled
- Speed: 14 knots
- Complement: not known
- Armament: eight 32-pounder guns; two rifled guns

USS R. R. Cuyler was a steamer in the United States Navy during the American Civil War. She was outfitted by the Union Navy as a gunboat and was assigned to the Union blockade of the Confederate States of America.

She was named for the president of the Central Georgia Railroad.

== Built in New York in 1860 ==
R. R. Cuyler was built in 1860 by Samuel Sneeden of New York for H. B. Cromwell & Company, served on that company's New York, Havana, and New Orleans line until laid up in March 1861 at the start of the American Civil War.

Then chartered by the War Department, she transported New York State militiamen to Washington, D.C., and returned to New York where she was acquired by the navy in May 1861, although not formally purchased until August.

== Civil War service ==
=== Assigned to the Gulf blockade ===
In early June, R. R. Cuyler departed New York City under the command of Captain Francis B. Ellison. On the 9th, she arrived at Key West, Florida, whence she proceeded north for blockade duty off Tampa, Florida. Although plagued by the presence of smallpox among her crew, R. R. Cuyler participated in the capture and burning of Finland in Apalachicola Bay on 26 August. On 22 November, while operating near and in the Mississippi River, she intercepted and assisted in the capture of the steamers A. J. View and Henry Lewis. In December, the sloops Advocate, Express, and Osceola and the schooners Delight and Olive met a similar fate. On 20 January 1863, off Mobile Bar, R. R. Cuyler seized the schooner J. W. Wilder. Two months later, she captured the schooner Grace E. Baker off Cuba, and on 3 May, the schooner Jane at sea.

Stationed off Mobile Bay during May, R. R. Cuyler captured the steamer Eugenie and the schooners Hunter and Isabel. On 14 July, the steamer Kate Dale joined her list of prizes. After that capture, the gunboat was ordered to join in the search for the Confederate raider Tallahassee. While proceeding on that mission on 4 December, she stopped and captured the steamer Armstrong and after a search revealed contraband cargo, seized the vessel.

=== Reassigned to the North Atlantic blockade ===
R. R. Cuyler joined the North Atlantic Blockading Squadron off Wilmington, North Carolina, for duty through the close of the Civil War. She joined in attacks on Fort Fisher in the Cape Fear River 24 and 25 December 1864, and participated in the capture of Fort Anderson nearby 18 and 19 February 1865.

== Post-war sale and subsequent career ==
Following the end of the Civil War, R. R. Cuyler returned to New York City, where she was decommissioned on 1 July 1865 and sold at auction on 15 August to Russel Sturgis of New York.

In December 1866, she was purchased by the Republic of Colombia and, after arrival at Cartagena, renamed El Rayo. She remained in Cartagena Harbor, the subject of a diplomatic dispute following a change of government, from February to September 1867. In mid-September, she was blown from her moorings during a storm and grounded on a coral reef, where she was abandoned.

== Commemoration ==
One of the 30-pound cannon that was part of the armament of R. R. Cuyler was presented to the town of Oyster Bay, New York, by the United States Department of the Navy and unveiled by President Theodore Roosevelt in June 1903. The cannon can be seen today in Townsend Park in Oyster Bay.
