= USS Fernandina =

Gunboat of the United States Navy

History

United States
- Acquired: 29 July 1861
- Commissioned: 16 November 1861
- Decommissioned: 29 April 1865
- Fate: Sold, 2 June 1865

General characteristics
- Displacement: 297 tons
- Length: 115 ft (35 m)
- Beam: 29 ft (8.8 m)
- Draft: 10 ft (3.0 m)
- Propulsion: sail
- Speed: 8 knots (15 km/h; 9.2 mph)
- Complement: 86
- Armament: 6 × 32-pounder guns

USS Fernandina was a bark purchased by the Union Navy during the American Civil War. She was used by the Union Navy as a patrol vessel, operating in Confederate waterways.

== Service history ==
Fernandina, a bark, was purchased 29 July 1861 at New York City as Florida; and renamed and commissioned 16 November 1861, Acting Volunteer Lieutenant G.W Browne in command. Fernandina reported for duty in the North Atlantic Blockading Squadron at Hampton Roads, Virginia, 2 December 1861, and was ordered south to duty on the blockade of Wilmington, North Carolina. On 13 December, she scattered a Confederate encampment on the beach near Little River Inlet, North Carolina, and 12 days later she took prize William H. Northrop, running the blockade with a cargo of drugs and coffee. The bark discovered the schooner Kate out of Nassau, Bahamas, run aground on 2 April 1862, and after taking her papers off, burned the schooner, since both Fernandina and her party boarding the blockade runner were under Confederate fire from the shore.

On 11 June, Fernandina was reassigned to the South Atlantic Blockading Squadron which she joined off Charleston, South Carolina. Aside from the summer of 1863, when she sailed north for repairs, the bark blockaded at St. Simons, Georgia and at St. Catherine's, Georgia, and in Ossabaw Sound. She captured the sloop Annie Thompson 16 January 1864, after the blockade runner had grounded. Detached from her squadron 3 April 1865, Fernandina was decommissioned at Philadelphia, Pennsylvania, 29 April 1866, and sold 2 June 1865.
