= List of Danish sail frigates =

This is a list of sail frigates serving either in the Royal Danish Navy or the Royal Dano-Norwegian Navy in the period 1650–1860:

- Phenix/Føniks 30/32 guns, captured by Sweden 1659 and renamed Danska Fenix
- Hummer 32 guns
- Forgyldte Fisk 28 guns
- Havfru 24 guns
- Flyvende Hjørt 14 guns
- Anthonette 34 guns
- Hvide Falk 28 guns
- Loss 26 guns, burnt 1679
- Jægare 24 guns
- Vindhund 14 guns
- Havmand 34 guns
- Spraglede Falk 16 guns
- Maagen 16 guns, scuttled following an action with Swedish Captain Printz in 1709
- Heyre 24 guns, sunk by Printz in 1712
- Sorte Ørn 20 guns, captured by Printz in 1715
- Højenhald 30 guns
- Raae 30 guns
- Postillion 26 guns
- Leopard 24 guns
- Søridder 28 guns
- Løvendals Gallej 20 guns
- Kongens Jagt Krone 24 guns
- Svenske Sophia 20 guns
- Stralsund 30 guns
- Najaden 42 guns, destroyed 1812
