= List of shipwrecks in October 1864 =

The list of shipwrecks in October 1864 includes ships sunk, foundered, grounded, or otherwise lost during October 1864.

== 1 October ==
List of shipwrecks: 1 October 1864
Ship	State	Description
Condor	United Kingdom	American Civil War, Union blockade: Pursued by the screw steamer USS Niphon (United States Navy), the 285-, 300-, or 446-ton sidewheel paddle steamer, a blockade runner, was deliberately run aground and wrecked off New Inlet on the coast of North Carolina, Confederate States of America when her pilot mistook the wreck of Night Hawk (Flag unknown) for a blockading United States Navy warship in the darkness. Intense Confederate fire from Fort Fisher prevented Niphon′s crew from destroying Condor. Confederate spy Rose O'Neal Greenhow tried to reach shore in one of Condor′s boats, but drowned when the boat overturned in heavy surf.
Fernandez I	Portugal	The barque collided with G. B. Blanchard (United States) and sank off the Tuskar Rock with the loss of a crew member. She was on a voyage from Liverpool, Lancashire, United Kingdom to Porto.
New Harriet	United Kingdom	The brig foundered at sea. Her crew were rescued by Fanny ( Danzig). New Harriet was on a voyage from Sunderland, County Durham, to Seville, Spain.
Stolp	Stolp	The brig was wrecked at Stolp.

== 2 October ==
List of shipwrecks: 2 October 1864
Ship	State	Description
Ceres	Bremen	The ship was abandoned at in the Atlantic Ocean. Her crew were rescued by Eliza (United Kingdom). Ceres was on a voyage from Quebec City, Province of Canada, British North America to Bremen.
Sir George Seymore	United Kingdom	The ship foundered in the Atlantic Ocean off Cape Cod, Massachusetts, United States with the loss of eighteen of her 40 crew. Survivors took to two boats. A message in a bottle washed up at Scarborough, Yorkshire on 19 August 1865 giving the news.
Susan	United Kingdom	The ship was driven ashore and severely damaged at Greystones, County Wicklow.
Village Belle	(United Kingdom of Great Britain and Ireland) British North America	The brig was run down and sunk off Lundy Island, Devon by the barque St. Arnold (France). Three of her crew were rescued by St. Arnold. Village Belle was on a voyage from Liverpool, Lancashire to Cardiff, Glamorgan.

== 3 October ==
List of shipwrecks: 3 October 1864
Ship	State	Description
Albatros	United Kingdom	The ship ran aground on the Newcombe Sand, in the North Sea off the coast of Suffolk and sank. Her crew survived. She was on a voyage from Sunderland, County Durham, to London.
Auguste	Prussia	The brig was abandoned in a sinking condition. Her crew were rescued by the brig Sofia (Italy).
Burmah	United Kingdom	The ship capsized and sank at Quebec City, Province of Canada, British North America. She was refloated on 22 OCtober.
Emma	United Kingdom	The sloop was driven ashore at Portland, Dorset. She was on a voyage from Weymouth to Poole.
Eva	United Kingdom	The schooner was wrecked on the Proudfoot Rocks, on the coast of Caithness. Her crew were rescued. She was on a voyage from Newcastle upon Tyne, Northumberland to Wick, Caithness.
Maria	Russia	The schooner was driven ashore at Dragør, Denmark. She was on a voyage from Gävle, Sweden to Hull, Yorkshire, United Kingdom. She was refloated on 28 October and taken in to Kragerø, Denmark in a severely damaged condition.
Mary Ellen, and Mary Sanders	United Kingdom	The schooners collided off the coast of Cornwall. Both vessel's crews abandoned ship, leaving their captains on board. Mary Ellen was driven ashore and wrecked at Penwith, Cornwall Mary Sanders was on a voyage from Liverpool, Lancashire to Looe, Cornwall. She was discovered by the schooner Bernard Barton (United Kingdom) which put tow hands on board. They took her in to the Isles of Scilly.
Ochiltree	United Kingdom	The schooner foundered off Campbeltown, Argyllshire. Her crew were rescued. She was on a voyage from Belfast, County Antrim to the Clyde.
Victoria	United Kingdom	The schooner ran aground and was damaged at Teignmouth. Devon. She was on a voyage from Newcastle upon Tyne to Teignmouth. She was refloated with assistance from the Teignmouth Lifeboat, taken in to Teignmouth and beached.

== 4 October ==
List of shipwrecks: 4 October 1864
Ship	State	Description
Doska	United Kingdom	The ship was driven ashore in the River Lune. She was on a voyage from Sulina, Ottoman Empire to the River Lune.
Dlesse	Russia	The schooner ran aground on the Gunfleet Sand, in the North Sea off the coast of Essex, United Kingdom. She was on a voyage from Kronstadt to London. She was refloated the next day and taken in to the River Colne in a leaky condition.
Lord Raglan	United Kingdom	The fishing smack was driven ashore and severely damaged at Berwick upon Tweed, Northumberland. She was refloated and beached in the harbour.
Martha and Ann	United Kingdom	The crewless sloop caught fire and sank off Berwick upon Tweed.
Martin Luther	Flag unknown	The abandoned barque was taken in to Grimsby, Lincolnshire, United Kingdom in a waterlogged condition.
Matilda and Maria	Flag unknown	The ship ran aground on the Barrows Sandbank, in the North Sea off the coast of Essex and was wrecked. She was on a voyage from Gothenburg, Sweden to Granville, Manche, France.
Queen	United Kingdom	The ship struck the Swilly Rocks and sank. Her crew were rescued. She was on a voyage from Caernarfon to Birkenhead, Cheshire.
Result	(United Kingdom of Great Britain and Ireland) Victoria	The schooner was wrecked at Sulphur Creek, New Zealand.
Shalda	Norway	The ship ran aground in the Isles of Scilly, United Kingdom. She was on a voyage from Cardiff, Glamorgan to Stockholm, Sweden. She was refloated and found to be severely damaged.
Snowdrop	United Kingdom	The barque ran aground on a reef off Stoneskar, Russia. Her crew were rescued. She was on a voyage from London to Kronstadt, Russia. She was subsequently scuttled. Her captain and mate were charged with barratry.
Superior	United Kingdom	The ship was driven ashore and wrecked at Killoughtry, County Wicklow with the loss of a crew member. She was on a voyage from Sligo to Cardiff, Glamorgan.

== 5 October ==
List of shipwrecks: 5 October 1864
Ship	State	Description
Aaron Brown	United Kingdom	The ship was driven ashore and severely damaged at Seebpore, India in a typhoon. She was refloated.
Adjai	India	The steamship was driven ashore and broke her back in the Hooghly River in a typhoon .
Admiral	United Kingdom	The ship was wrecked in a typhoon at Calcutta.
Admiral Carey	United Kingdom	The ship was driven ashore in a typhoon at Calcutta.
Agabaker, or Aga Bakur	United Kingdom	The ship was driven ashore in a typhoon at Calcutta. She was refloated.
Agra	United Kingdom	The ship was driven ashore and severely damaged in the Hooghly River in a typhoon. She was refloated.
A. J. Kerr	United Kingdom	The ship was lost in a typhoon at Calcutta, India.
Akbar	United Kingdom	The ship was severely damaged in a typhoon at Calcutta.
Alabama	United Kingdom	The ship was damaged in a typhoon at Calcutta.
Aladdin	United Kingdom	The barque was driven ashore and became severely hogged in the Hooghly River at Armenian Ghat in a typhoon. She was on a voyage from Calcutta to Bombay, India. She was condemned. She was sold as a wreck and was dismantled.
Alaric	United Kingdom	The ship was driven ashore and damaged in the Hooghly River in a typhoon. She was refloated and placed under repair.
Alexandra	United Kingdom	The tug was driven ashore on the Pipley Sand in a typhoon.
Alexander John Kerr	United Kingdom	The ship capsized in a typhoon at Cossipore and was wrecked.
Allee, or Ally	United Kingdom	The ship ran aground, capsized and was wrecked at in the Hooghly River between Kantabaria Point and Middle Point in a typhoon. More than 350 people died; there were eight or ten survivors. She was on a voyage from Calcutta to Mauritius.
Alligator	United Kingdom	The tug was run ashore and severely damaged at Canterbury Point, in the Hooghly River, in a typhoon.
Ally Akbah Shah	India	The ship was driven ashore and severely damaged in a typhoon at Calcutta. She was refloated.
Alphée	France	The steamship was damaged at Diamond Harbour in a typhoon. She was on a voyage from Calcutta to Galle, Ceylon and Marseille, Bouches-du-Rhône. She put back to Calcutta.
Alphonse et Nellie	France	The ship was driven ashore, capsized and was severely damaged in the Hooghly River in a typhoon. She was refloated.
Amiral Casey	France	The full-rigged ship was driven ashore and damaged in the Hooghly River in a typhoon.
Amun Shah	India	The ship was driven ashore and severely damaged in a typhoon at Calcutta. She was refloated.
Ann	United Kingdom	The East Indiaman was damaged in a typhoon at Calcutta.
Anne de Bretagne	France	The ship was driven ashore and severely damaged in the Hooghly River in a typhoon. She was refloated.
Anne Royden	United Kingdom	The ship was driven ashore and sank in the Hooghly River at Cossipore in a typhoon.
Annette Lyle	United Kingdom	The ship was driven ashore and severely damaged in the Hooghly River at Seebpore in a typhoon.
Aphrodite	United Kingdom	The steamship was damaged in a typhoon at Calcutta when she was driven into by Hindostan (United Kingdom). She was subsequently repaired.
Arab	United Kingdom	The tug was wrecked in a typhoon at Calcutta.
Armenian	United Kingdom	The ship damaged in a typhoon at Calcutta.
Arratoon Apcar	India	The steamship was damaged in a typhoon at Calcutta. She was placed under repair.
Ascension	United Kingdom	The ship was damaged in a typhoon at Calcutta.
Asteroid	United Kingdom	The ship was driven ashore and severely damaged in the Hooghly River at Cossipore in a typhoon.
Astronomer	United Kingdom	The ship was driven ashore and severely damaged in the Hooghly River in a typhoon. She was refloated.
Azemia	United Kingdom	The ship sank at in the Hooghly River at Calcutta in a typhoon with the loss of her captain.
Azzopardi	Flag unknown	The ship was driven ashore and damaged in a typhoon at Seebpore. She was refloated, but had to be beached.
Banshee	United Kingdom	The tug sank at Calcutta in a typhoon.
Baron Brorr	United Kingdom	The steamship was damaged in a typhoon at Calcutta.
Baron Renfrew	United Kingdom	The steamship was driven ashore and wrecked in the Hooghly River near Diamond Harbour in a typhoon. All on board were rescued by the steamship Defiance (United Kingdom).
Basmadia	United Kingdom	The ship was damaged in a typhoon at Calcutta.
Batoinot	France	The ship was damaged in a typhoon at Calcutta.
Beaumaris Castle	United Kingdom	The ship was driven ashore and severely damaged at Calcutta in a typhoon. She was refloated and placed under repair.
Benfollyen	United Kingdom	The ship was driven ashore and severely damaged in the Hooghly River in a typhoon.
Bengal	United Kingdom	The steamship was driven onto the College Sand, in the Hooghly River in a typhoon and was damaged. She was refloated in January 1865.
Bengoti	United Kingdom	The ship was damaged in a typhoon at Calcutta.
Bengallium, or Bengallyon	United Kingdom	The ship was driven ashore and severely damaged in a typhoon at Calcutta.
Bentinck	United Kingdom	The hospital ship was driven ashore, broke her back and was wrecked at Diamond Harbour in a typhoon. All on board were rescued.
Bolton Abbey	United Kingdom	The ship was driven ashore and severely damaged at Seebpore in a typhoon. She was refloated.
Botanist	United Kingdom	The ship was severely damaged in a typhoon at Calcutta.
Bretagne	France	The ship was severely damaged in a typhoon at Calcutta.
Broughton Hall	United Kingdom	The ship was driven ashore and damaged in the Hooghly River at Ramkistopore in a typhoon. She was on a voyage from Calcutta to Bombay. She was refloated. She was sold as a wreck.
Cachar	India	The steamship foundered in the Hooghly River in a typhoon.
Calumet	United Kingdom	The ship was driven ashore and damaged at Calcutta in a typhoon. She was refloated and repaired.
shipCama Family'	United Kingdom	The ship was driven ashore at Calcutta in a typhoon .
Camperdown	United Kingdom	The ship was driven ashore and severely damaged in a typhoon at Calcutta. She was refloated and was subsequently repaired.
Canrobert	United Kingdom	The steamship was severely damaged in a typhoon at Calcutta.
Caribbean	United Kingdom	The ship was driven ashore and severely damaged in the Hooghly River at Seebpore in a typhoon. She was on a voyage from Calcutta to Hull, Yorkshire. She was refloated, but found to be severely hogged.
Carnbell	United Kingdom	The ship was driven ashore and severely damaged in a typhoon at Calcutta.
Carobee	United Kingdom	The ship was damaged at Bombay in a typhoon.
Carobel	United Kingdom	The ship was driven ashore at Howrah railway station and severely damaged in a typhoon. She was refloated.
Caster Belle	United Kingdom	The ship was damaged in a typhoon at Calcutta.
C. D. Lahaore, or C. D. Schadre	Flag unknown	The ship was severely damaged in a typhoon at Calcutta.
Celinie	United Kingdom	The ship was driven ashore and severely damaged in the Hooghly River in a typhoon.
Ceylon	United Kingdom	The ship was severely damaged at Calcutta in a typhoon.
Cheduba	India	The ship was damaged in a typhoon at Calcutta.
Cheshire	United Kingdom	The ship was driven ashore and severely damaged in the Hooghly River at Howrah in a typhoon. She was refloated.
Childwall Abbey	United Kingdom	The ship was damaged at Calcutta in a typhoon.
Christina	United Kingdom	The ship was damaged at Bombay in a typhoon.
Cimandel	United Kingdom	The ship was damaged in a typhoon at Calcutta.
City of Lahore	India	The steamship was driven ashore and severely damaged in the Hooghly River at Baboo Ghat in a typhoon. She was refloated in late October and placed under repair.
City of Paris	France	The ship was driven ashore and severely damaged in the Hooghly River at Cossipore in a typhoon. She was refloated in mid-October and placed under repair.
Clemence and Leonie	United Kingdom	The ship was driven ashore at Calcutta in a typhoon. She was refloated in January 1865.
Clive	United Kingdom	The ship was severely damaged in a typhoon at Calcutta.
Clymenestra	United Kingdom	The ship was driven ashore and severely damaged in a typhoon at Calcutta. She was refloated and repaired.
C. N.	United Kingdom	The ship was driven ashore and severely damaged in a typhoon at Calcutta. She was refloated.
Collingwood	United Kingdom	The barque was driven ashore and damaged in the Hooghly River in a typhoon. Her crew were rescued. She was on a voyage from Calcutta to Demerara, British Guiana. She was refloated.
Columbo	United Kingdom	The ship sank off Saugor in a typhoon with the loss of all hands. She was on a voyage from Calcutta to Hull.
Columbus	United Kingdom	The tug was damaged in a typhoon at Calcutta.
Continental	United Kingdom	The ship was driven onto the Goosery Sands and damaged in a typhoon. She was refloated and taken in to Calcutta, where she was repaired.
Countess Elgin	United Kingdom	The ship was driven ashore in a typhoon at Calcutta. She was refloated.
Dedna	United Kingdom	The ship was damaged in a typhoon at Calcutta.
Dingo, Dirigio or Dirigo	United Kingdom	The ship was driven ashore, capsized and was severely damaged in a typhoon at Colvin Ghat.
Dumfries	United Kingdom	The brig was abandoned in the Atlantic Ocean. Her crew were rescued. She was on a voyage from Liverpool, Lancashire to Halifax, Nova Scotia, British North America.
Dwarharat, or Dwarkhananth	India	The tug was wrecked or foundered in a typhoon at Calcutta with the loss of all hands.
Earl of Clare	United Kingdom	The ship was driven ashore and severely damaged in a typhoon at Baranagar.
Eastern Belle	United Kingdom	The ship was driven ashore and severely damaged in a typhoon at Cossipore. She was refloated and placed under repair.
Esmeralda	United Kingdom	The ship was driven ashore and severely damaged in the Hooghly River at Cossipore in a typhoon.
Fair Rosalind	United Kingdom	The ship was severely damaged in a typhoon at Calcutta.
Faizrebany, or Fez Rabany	United Kingdom	The ship was driven ashore and wrecked in a typhoon at Calcutta.
Family Cuet	United Kingdom	The ship was severely damaged in a typhoon at Calcutta.
Fire Queen	United Kingdom	The tug sank at Calcutta in a typhoon.
Fleda	United Kingdom	The brig sank in the Bay of Simoda in a typhoon.
Fookim	India	The ship was damaged in a typhoon at Calcutta.
Forbes	United Kingdom	The tug was run into by two ships and sank on the Seebpore Sand in a typhoon. She was refloated.
French Empire	France	The ship was driven ashore and severely damaged in a typhoon at Calcutta.
Futty Allum	India	The ship was driven ashore in a typhoon at Goosery.
Futty Shah Allum	India	The ship was driven ashore in a typhoon at Cossipore.
Gaspar Lightship (two vessels)	India	The lightships were reported missing following the typhoon.
Genii	United Kingdom	The ship was severely damaged at Calcutta in a typhoon. She was refloated.
Georgiana	United Kingdom	The ship was driven ashore and severely damaged in a typhoon at Calcutta. She was refloated.
Glenety	United Kingdom	The ship was damaged in a typhoon at Calcutta.
Glenroy	United Kingdom	The ship was driven ashore and severely damaged in the Hooghly River at Cossipore in a typhoon. She was condemned.
Gogra	United Kingdom	The ship was severely damaged in a typhoon at Calcutta.
Gorundpoor	United Kingdom	The ship was wrecked in a typhoon at Calcutta.
Governor General McDuff	United Kingdom	The ship was driven ashore and severely damaged in the Hooghly River in a typhoon.
Govindpore	India	The ship was run into by another vessel, capsized and sank in a typhoon at Calcutta with the loss of one of her nine crew. She was on a voyage from Calcutta to Mauritius.
Grappler	United Kingdom	The buoy tender was run into by Princess Royal (United Kingdom), broke from her moorings, collided with five other vessels and was driven ashore in the Hooghly River in a typhoon.
Great Tasmania	United Kingdom	The ship was driven ashore and wrecked in the Hooghly River in a typhoon.
Gustave et Louis	France	The barque was driven ashore, capsized and was damaged in the Hooghly River at Prinsep's Ghat in a typhoon. She was refloated and repaired.
Hampden	United Kingdom	The ship was driven ashore and damaged in the Hooghly River in a typhoon.
Hannibal	United Kingdom	The ship was driven ashore and damaged in the Hooghly River at Seebpore in a typhoon. She was refloated.
Hanover	United Kingdom	The ship ran aground on the Goosery Sands, in the Hooghly River in a typhoon. She was severely damaged.
Harry Warren, or Henry Warren	United Kingdom	The ship was driven ashore and severely damaged in the Hooghly River in a typhoon. She was refloated on 10 October.
Hatelie	United Kingdom	The ship was wrecked in a typhoon at Calcutta.
Helen Nicholson	United Kingdom	The ship was driven ashore and damaged in a typhoon at Calcutta.
Hercules	United Kingdom	The paddle tug sank in the Hooghly River in a typhoon.
Hindostan	United Kingdom	The paddle steamer, a hulk and floating church, was crushed between the steamships Nemesis and Nubia (both United Kingdom) in the Hooghly River at Cossipore in a typhoon. She capsized, drove into the steamship Aphrodite (United Kingdom), broke in two and sank.
Hindustan	United Kingdom	The tug sank in a typhoon at Calcutta.
Hippolyte	United Kingdom	The ship was driven ashore in the Hooghly River in a typhoon. She did not sustain much damage.
Holetta	United Kingdom	The ship was driven ashore and severely damaged in a typhoon at Calcutta.
Hope	Trinity House	The lightship foundered in a typhoon off the coast of India with the loss of all hands.
Howrab	India	The ferry, a steamboat was driven ashore and wrecked in a typhoon at Calcutta.
Howrahside	India	The ship was damaged at Calcutta in a typhoon.
Illery	United Kingdom	The ship was severely damaged in a typhoon at Calcutta.
India	United Kingdom	The ship was driven ashore and severely damaged in a typhoon at Calcutta.
Indian	United Kingdom	The ship was driven ashore and damaged in a typhoon at Cossipore. She was refloated and placed under repair.
Indus Arunniator	British Raj	The ship was severely damaged in a typhoon at Calcutta.
Inspector	Flag unknown	The ship foundered in the Indian Ocean. Her crew were rescued by St. Joseph (United Kingdom.
Interloper	United Kingdom	The tug was driven ashore and severely damaged at Calcutta in a typhoon. She was refloated.
Iron Duke	United Kingdom	The full-rigged ship was driven ashore and severely damaged in the Hooghly River in a typhoon.
Jane Lewis, or Jean Louis	United Kingdom	The ship capsized at Calcutta in a typhoon.
Jest	United Kingdom	The ship was severely damaged in a typhoon at Calcutta.
John Chism	United Kingdom	The ship was driven ashore and severely damaged in a typhoon at Calcutta. She was refloated.
Kedgeree	India	The pilot vessel was damaged in a typhoon at Calcutta.
Kenyon	United Kingdom	The ship was driven ashore and damaged in a typhoon at Cossipore.
King Arthur	United Kingdom	The ship was driven ashore in the Hooghly River at Cossipore in a typhoon. She subsequently broke up.
Knight Commander	United Kingdom	The full-rigged ship was driven ashore and severely damaged in a typhoon at Calcutta.
Krishna	United Kingdom	The ship ran aground and was severely damaged in a typhoon at Calcutta. She was refloated.
Lacella	United Kingdom	The ship was damaged in a typhoon at Calcutta.
Lady Franklin	United Kingdom	The ship sank in a typhoon at Calcutta. Her crew were rescued by boats from Caribbean and Hannibal (both United Kingdom). Lady Franklin was on a voyage from Calcutta to Bombay.
Lady Gladstone	United Kingdom	The ship was driven ashore and severely damaged in a typhoon at Calcutta.
Lady Palmerston	United Kingdom	The ship was driven ashore and severely damaged in the Hooghly River in a typhoon.
Lady Rawlinson	United Kingdom	The ship driven ashore and damaged in a typhoon at Calcutta.
Latona	United Kingdom	The ship was driven ashore and wrecked in the Hooghly River at Seebpore in a typhoon.
Leonides	India	The steamship was driven ashore and severely damaged in the Hooghly River in a typhoon. She was refloated.
Lincolnshire	United Kingdom	The ship was driven ashore and severely damaged in the Hooghly River in a typhoon. She was refloated.
Linnet	United Kingdom	The tug sank at Calcutta in a typhoon.
Loan	United Kingdom	The ship was damaged in a typhoon at Calcutta.
Loo-choo	United Kingdom	The ship sank in a typhoon at Calcutta. She was on a voyage from Calcutta to Colombo, Ceylon.
Lord Lyndhurst	United Kingdom	The ship was driven ashore in a typhoon at Calcutta.
Macduff	United Kingdom	The ship was driven ashore and severely damaged in a typhoon at Calcutta. She was refloated.
Madras	India	The steamship was severely damaged at Calcutta in a typhoon. She had been refloated by 13 October.
Mahratta	United Kingdom	The ship was severely damaged in a typhoon at Calcutta.
Mary Grant	United Kingdom	The ship was damaged in a typhoon at Calcutta.
Mary Stuart, or Mary Stewart	United Kingdom	The tugboat was driven ashore and damaged in a typhoon at Calcutta. She was refloated.
Manilla	United Kingdom	The ship was driven ashore in the Hooghly River at the Burning Ghat in a typhoon. She was refloated.
Martaban	United Kingdom	The ship was severely damaged in a typhoon at Kedgeree.
Mauritius	United Kingdom	The steamship was driven ashore and severely damaged in the Hooghly River in a typhoon. She was later refloated and repaired.
Medusa	United Kingdom	The ship was driven ashore in the Hooghly River in a typhoon.
Megna	India	The survey ship was driven ashore near Kedgeree in a typhoon. Her crew were rescued.
Merrie England	United Kingdom	The ship ran aground, broke her back and sank in the Hooghly River at Bhagbazar in a typhoon. She was refloated.
Metis	United Kingdom	The ship was driven ashore at Baboo Ghat in a typhoon. She was later refloated and repaired.
Midas	United Kingdom	The ship was driven ashore and severely damaged in a typhoon at Calcutta.
Mirzapore	India	The paddle steamer was driven ashore and severely damaged at Armenian Ghat in a typhoon.
Monmouthshire	United Kingdom	The ship was driven ashore and severely damaged in the Hooghly River in a typhoon. She was refloated.
Mooresfoot	United Kingdom	The ship ran aground on the Goosery Sands in a typhoon and was damaged. She was refloated.
Morayshire	United Kingdom	The ship was damaged in a typhoon at Seebpore.
Morning Star	United Kingdom	The ship was wrecked on the Whittaker Spit, in the North Sea off the coast of Essex. Her crew were rescued. She was on a voyage from Kronstadt, Russia to London.
Moulmein	United Kingdom	The steamship sank at Calcutta in a typhoon. She had been refloated by 13 October and was subsequently repaired.
Nada, or Nadir	United Kingdom	The steamship was driven ashore and damaged in a typhoon at Clive South Ghat.
Nagasaki	United Kingdom	The ship was damaged in a typhoon at Calcutta.
Nellie	United Kingdom	The ship was driven ashore in the Hooghly River in a typhoon.
Nemesis	United Kingdom	The steamship was driven onto the College Sand in a typhoon. She was refloated the next day.
Newcastle	United Kingdom	The ship was driven onto the Seebpore Sands in a typhoon and was severely damaged. She was refloated on 20 October and was subsequently repaired.
Nimrod	United Kingdom	The tug was driven ashore and wrecked in the Hooghly River at Cossipore in a typhoon. She was refloated.
Nomade	United Kingdom	The ship was driven ashore and severely damaged in the Hooghly River in a typhoon. she was refloated.
North Atlantic	United States	The barque was run into by the steamship Thunder (United Kingdom), which ended up across her poop deck.
Nouvelle Ascension	France	The ship was driven ashore and severely damaged in a typhoon at Calcutta. She was refloated.
Nubia	United Kingdom	The steamship was driven onto the College Sand in a typhoon. She was refloated the next day.
Oanita	United Kingdom	The ship was driven into the wreck of Azemia (United Kingdom) in a typhoon at Calcutta and was damaged. She was refloated and subsequently repaired.
Orissa	United Kingdom	The steamship was damaged at Calcutta in a typhoon.
Ounce	United Kingdom	The ship was severely damaged in a typhoon at Calcutta.
Paragon	United Kingdom	The ship was driven ashore in a typhoon at Calcutta.
Pearl	United Kingdom	The ship, a brig or a tug, was severely in a typhoon at Calcutta.
Persia	United Kingdom	The steamship foundered in the Bay of Bengal off the mouth of the Hooghly River in a typhoon with the loss more than 320 lives. Two survivors were rescued by Orissa (United Kingdom). She was on a voyage from Rangoon, Burma to Calcutta.
Philbert	United Kingdom	The steamship was driven ashore in the Hooghly River in a typhoon. She was refloated.
Phoenix	United Kingdom	The tug sank in the Hooghly River in a typhoon with the loss of some of her crew. One of the three survivors was rescued by Defiance (United Kingdom).
Pilot	United Kingdom	The tug was driven ashore and severely damaged in a typhoon at Calcutta.
Pirate	United Kingdom	The ship was severely damaged at Calcutta in a typhoon.
Preciosa	Netherlands	The schooner collided with the schooner Tonkin (United Kingdom) and was abandoned off Cape Finisterre, Spain with the loss of one of her six crew. Survivors were rescued by Tonkin. Preciosa was on a voyage from Amsterdam, North Holland to Lisbon, Portugal.
Pride of Canada	United Kingdom	The ship was driven onto the Goosery Sand and severely damaged in a typhoon. She was on a voyage from Calcutta to Bombay. Pride of Canada was refloated in January 1865.
Prince Albert	India	The steamship was driven ashore at Calcutta in a typhoon.
Prince of Wales	United Kingdom	The steamship was driven ashore at Calcutta in a typhoon.
Princess Royal	United Kingdom	The ship was driven ashore and damaged at Cossipore in a typhoon. She was refloated.
Punjaub	British Raj	The steamship was severely damaged at Calcutta in a typhoon.
Queen of the Age	United Kingdom	The ship driven ashore and severely damaged in the Hooghly River in a typhoon. She was refloated and placed under repair.
Queen Victoria	United Kingdom	The steamship was driven ashore in a typhoon at Calcutta.
Rasmodia	United Kingdom	The steamship was damaged in a typhoon at Calcutta.
Red Rose	United Kingdom	The ship was driven ashore and severely damaged in the Hooghly River at Barnagore in a typhoon. She was refloated.
Reiver	United Kingdom	The steamship was driven ashore in a typhoon at Calcutta. She was refloated.
Renown	United Kingdom	The ship was damaged in a typhoon at Calcutta.
Richard Basleed, or Richard Boustead, or Richard Busteed	United Kingdom	The ship was driven ashore and severely damaged in a typhoon at Cossipore.
River Clyde	United Kingdom	The ship was damaged in a typhoon at Calcutta.
Robert Lee	United Kingdom	The ship was driven ashore and severely damaged in a typhoon at Calcutta. She was refloated.
Roda	United Kingdom	The ship was driven ashore in a typhoon at Calcutta.
Romaigne Empire	France	The ship was damaged in a typhoon at Calcutta.
Romania	United Kingdom	The ship was driven ashore in the Hooghly River at Prinseps Ghat in a typhoon.
Romany	United Kingdom	The ship was driven ashore in the Hooghly River in a typhoon.
Royal Alexander	United Kingdom	The ship was driven ashore and severely damaged at Garden Reach in a typhoon. She was refloated.
Royal Oak	United Kingdom	The ship was damaged in a typhoon at Calcutta.
Saigon	United Kingdom	The ship was damaged in a typhoon at Calcutta.
Salsette	United Kingdom	The ship was driven ashore and severely damaged in the Hooghly River in a typhoon. She was refloated.
Salween	India	The survey ship, a brig, was driven ashore near Kedgeree in a typhoon. Her crew were rescued.
Sarah and Emma	United Kingdom	The ship was run into by the steamship Nemesis (United Kingdom) and sank in the Hooghly River at Garden Bridge in a typhoon. She was refloated and placed under repair.
Satellite	United Kingdom	The tug sank at Calcutta in a typhoon with the loss of her captain. A crew member was rescued by Hercules (United Kingdom).
Sea Horse	United Kingdom	The ship was driven onto the Seebpore Sands, in the Hooghly River in a typhoon and was severely damaged. She was refloated and placed under repair.
Sesostris	United Kingdom	The ship was driven ashore and broke her back in the Hooghly River at Cossipore in a typhoon.
Shaw	United Kingdom	The ship was severely damaged in a typhoon at Calcutta.
Simla	United Kingdom	The ship was driven ashore and damaged in the Hooghly River at Cossipore in a typhoon.
Singapore	France	The ship was wrecked in the Hooghly River at Garden House Point in a typhoon. Her crew were rescued. She was on a voyage from Calcutta to Mauritius.
Sinclair	United Kingdom	The ship was severely damaged in a typhoon at Calcutta.
Sir Jamsetjee Family	United Kingdom	The full-rigged ship was driven ashore and severely damaged in the Hooghly River at Cossipore in a typhoon.
Sir Jamactjee	India	The ship was driven ashore and severely damaged in the Hooghly River in a typhoon.
Sir John Lawrence	United Kingdom	The 1,019 ton ship collided with several other vessels and was driven ashore in the Hooghly River upstream of Cossipore in a typhoon. She was severely damaged. She was on a voyage from Calcutta to London. Sir John Lawrence was refloated.
Sir John Lawrence	United Kingdom	The 699 ton ship was driven ashore and severely damaged in a typhoon at Calcutta. She was refloated.
Sir William Eyre	United Kingdom	The ship was driven ashore, capsized and broke her back in a typhoon at Calcutta. She was condemned.
Solway	United Kingdom	The ship was driven ashore and severely damaged on the Goosery Sands in a typhoon.
Sooloo	India	The ship was driven ashore in the Hooghly River in a typhoon.
Sophia Joachim	United Kingdom	The ship was drive ashore and severely damaged in a typhoon at Cossipore.
Southampton	United Kingdom	The East Indiaman was wrecked in a typhoon at Calcutta. She was on a voyage from Calcutta to Bombay.
Southern Belle	United Kingdom	The ship was driven ashore and severely damaged in the Hooghly River at Minlottah in a typhoon. She was refloated in January 1865.
Southern Cross	United Kingdom	The ship was driven ashore and damaged in the Hooghly River at Mintollah in a typhoon. She was refloated and placed under repair.
Speedy	United Kingdom	The ship was driven ashore and severely damaged in the Hooghly River in a typhoon. She was refloated.
Stately	United Kingdom	The ship was severely damaged in a typhoon at Calcutta.
Stearlatta	United Kingdom	The brig was damaged in a typhoon at Calcutta.
St. Gogra	India	The steamship was severely damaged in a typhoon at Calcutta.
St. Metie	United Kingdom	The ship was severely damaged in a typhoon at Calcutta.
St. Philbert	United Kingdom	The ship was driven ashore and damaged in a typhoon at Calcutta.
Sultany	United Kingdom	The steamship was damaged in a typhoon at Calcutta.
Sydney	United Kingdom	The steamship was driven ashore and severely damaged at Calcutta in a typhoon. She was refloated.
Talavera	United Kingdom	The ship was driven ashore and damaged in a typhoon at Bhagbazar in a typhoon. She was refloated. She was later refloated and repaired.
Talja	United Kingdom	The ship was severely damaged at Calcutta in a typhoon.
Tangier	United Kingdom	The ship was damaged in a typhoon at Calcutta.
Tarragon	United Kingdom	The ship was driven ashore and severely damaged in the Hooghly River in a typhoon. She was refloated.
Tartar	United Kingdom	The ship was driven ashore and severely damaged on the Goosery Sands in a typhoon.
Tchernaya	United Kingdom	The ship was driven ashore and damaged in a typhoon at Cossipore.
Thalatta	United Kingdom	The ship was driven ashore and wrecked at Cossipore in a typhoon. She was refloated.
Thalatta	United Kingdom	The ship was wrecked at Bombay in a typhoon.
Thames	United Kingdom	The East Indiaman was driven ashore in the Hooghly River in a typhoon. She was refloated.
Thorndean	United Kingdom	The ship was damaged in a typhoon at Calcutta.
Thug	United Kingdom	The ship was wrecked in a typhoon at Calcutta.
Thunder	United Kingdom	The steamship was driven onto the wreck of North Atlantic (United States) and was wrecked on the Goosery Sands in a typhoon. She was refloated and repaired.
Tinto	United Kingdom	The ship capsized in a typhoon at Calcutta. She was righted.
Tornado	United Kingdom	The full-rigged ship was driven ashore and damaged in the Hooghly River in a typhoon.
Tulja	United Kingdom	The ship was driven ashore and severely damaged at Cossipore in a typhoon. She was refloated.
Uduff	United Kingdom	The ship was severely damaged in a typhoon at Calcutta.
Union	United Kingdom	The tug was driven ashore and severely damaged at Seebpore in a typhoon.
Vespasian	United Kingdom	The ship sank in a typhoon at Calcutta with the loss of ten lives. She was on a voyage from Calcutta to Colombo and London.
Victoria	United Kingdom	The tug was damaged in a typhoon at Calcutta.
Victoria Bridge	United Kingdom	The ship was driven ashore and severely damaged in a typhoon at Cossipore. She was refloated in January 1865.
Ville de Saint Denis	France	The ship sank at Calcutta in a typhoon. She was on a voyage from Calcutta to Mauritius.
Ville de Saint Pierre	France	The ship was driven ashore and severely damaged in the Hooghly River in a typhoon. She was refloated.
Vulcan	United Kingdom	The tug was driven ashore and damaged in a typhoon at Calcutta.
War Eagle	United Kingdom	The ship was driven ashore and severely damaged in the Hooghly River in a typhoon. Also reported to have held her moorings, sustaining little damage.
Waterloo	United Kingdom	The ship was driven ashore and sank in the Hooghly River in a typhoon. She was refloated and found to be severely damaged.
West	United Kingdom	The ship was damaged in a typhoon at Calcutta.
Western Empire	United Kingdom	The ship was driven ashore and severely damaged in the Hooghly River at Goosery in a typhoon. She was refloated.
Western Star	United Kingdom	The ship was driven ashore and severely damaged in the Hooghly River at Seebpore in a typhoon.
White Jacket	United Kingdom	The ship was driven ashore in a typhoon at Calcutta.
Wide-awake	United Kingdom	The ship was driven ashore and severely damaged in the Hooghly River in a typhoon. She was refloated.
William Fairburn	United Kingdom	The ship was severely damaged in a typhoon at Calcutta.
Winchester	United Kingdom	The ship was driven ashore and damaged in the Hooghly River at Cossipore in a typhoon. She was later refloated and repaired.
Zenobia	United Kingdom	The steamship was damaged in a typhoon at Calcutta.

== 6 October ==
List of shipwrecks: 6 October 1864
Ship	State	Description
Constance, or Constance Decima	United Kingdom	American Civil War, Union blockade: The 140-ton sidewheel paddle steamer, a blockade runner en route from Nova Scotia, British North America to Charleston, South Carolina, Confederate States of America, with a cargo of weapons and possibly gold, was sunk off the coast of South Carolina. One account reports her to have been forced aground and sunk off the Isle of Palms by the gunboat USS Wamsutta (United States Navy); according to another, she struck the wreck of the screw steamer Georgiana (Confederate States of America) and sank 1 nautical mile (1.9 km) out from and 2 nautical miles (3.7 km) east of Breach Inlet, 640 to 680 yards (590 to 620 m) from the site of the wrecks of Georgiana and the sidewheel paddle steamer Mary Bowers (United Kingdom).
Henry S. Dickerson	United States	The 57-ton screw steamer exploded on the Mississippi River at St. Louis, Missouri, killing five people.
Mary	United Kingdom	The ship ran aground at Rønne, Denmark. She was on a voyage from Hull, Yorkshire to Kronstadt, Russia. She was refloated and resumed her voyage.

== 7 October ==
List of shipwrecks: 7 October 1864
Ship	State	Description
Annie	Confederate States of America	American Civil War, Union blockade: The steamer, a blockade runner, was run aground at New Inlet, North Carolina, by the armed tug USS Aster (United States Navy).
USS Aster	United States Navy	American Civil War, Union blockade: The armed tug ran hard aground on the Carolina Shoals near New Inlet off North Carolina. She was set on fire the next day to prevent her capture by Confederate forces, and eventually exploded.
Humboldt	Bremen	The ship was driven ashore near Antwerp, Belgium.
Liverpool	United Kingdom	The ship ran aground off Matanzas, Cuba. She was on a voyage from Liverpool, Lancashire to Matanzas. She was refloated and taken in to Matanzas.

== 8 October ==
List of shipwrecks: 8 October 1864
Ship	State	Description
Empire	United Kingdom	The ship ran aground at Havana, Cuba. She was on a voyage from Havana to Liverpool, Lancashire. She was refloated.
Oregon	United States	The ship was abandoned in the Atlantic Ocean. Her crew were rescued by the barque Argus, and by India and Kurline (all United Kingdom).
USS Picket Boat No. 2	United States Navy	American Civil War: The torpedo boat ran aground on a sandbar in Great Wicomico Bay, Virginia, Confederate States of America while under attack by Confederate guerrillas and was forced to surrender. When the armed steamer USS Commodore Read and the USS Mercury (both United States Navy) began to shell her, the Confederates scuttled her. Union forces recaptured her wreck on 19 October.
Vestal	United Kingdom	The schooner was driven ashore and wrecked at Villaricos, Spain.

== 9 October ==
List of shipwrecks: 9 October 1864
Ship	State	Description
Feeda	United Kingdom	The barque was driven ashore and wrecked in Agoo Bay, Japan. She was on a voyage from Yokohama, Japan to London.
Roanoke	United States	American Civil War: The mail steamer was burned in the Atlantic Ocean off St. George's, Bermuda, by Confederate agents. The Confederates had seized control of her on 29 September, soon after she departed Havana, Cuba, for a voyage to New York, and had shot and thrown overboard one member of her crew during the incident.

== 10 October ==
List of shipwrecks: 10 October 1864
Ship	State	Description
Alexander	United Kingdom	The barque was abandoned in the Atlantic Ocean. Her crew were rescued. She was on a voyage from Tralee, County Kerry to Quebec City, Province of Canada, British North America.
Amelia	Brazil	The brig capsized in a thunderstorm at Rio de Janeiro. She was righted.
Augusta Aurora	Denmark	The barque capsized in a thunderstorm at Rio de Janeiro and was severely damaged. She was righted.
Henry	United Kingdom	Carrying assorted cargo, the brig was wrecked on Block Island off the coast of Rhode Island, United States.
Johannes	Denmark	The brig capsized in a thunderstorm at Rio de Janeiro. She was righted.
Leighton	United Kingdom	The barque was capsized by a tornado in the harbor at Rio de Janeiro with the loss of one life. She was righted.
Marianina	Italy	The ship caught fire in the Mediterranean Sea 40 nautical miles (74 km) off Ischia and was abandoned. Her crew were rescued by Heidrum (Flag unknown). Marianina was on a voyage from Swansea, Glamorgan, United Kingdom to Naples.
Oregon	United Kingdom	The ship was discovered derelict in the Atlantic Ocean. Twelve crew were put on board by Eliza. They pumped her out took her in to Plymouth, Devon.
San Manuel	Brazil	The brig capsized in a thunderstorm at Rio de Janeiro. She was righted.
Solidad	Spain	The schooner collided with the schooner Star of Peace (United Kingdom) and was abandoned off Málaga in a sinking condition. She was on a voyage from Cádiz to Roses.
Vencedor	Brazil	The yacht capsized in a thunderstorm at Rio de Janeiro. She was righted.

== 11 October ==
List of shipwrecks: 11 October 1864
Ship	State	Description
Hero	United Kingdom	The yawl ran aground at Teignmouth, Devon. A crew member was rescued by the Teignmouth Lifeboat China (United Kingdom).

== 12 October ==
List of shipwrecks: 12 October 1864
Ship	State	Description
Claraowen	United Kingdom	The ship ran aground at Riga, Russia. She was refloated and found to be leaky.
Gem	United Kingdom	The brig was driven ashore and severely damaged near Calais, France. She was on a voyage from Memel, Prussia to Llanelly, Glamorgan.
Gurden Rebow	United Kingdom	The ship was driven ashore and wrecked in Angra Bay, Azores. Her crew were rescued.
Washington	Norway	The brig was driven ashore and wrecked in Angra Bay. Her crew were rescued.

== 13 October ==
List of shipwrecks: 13 October 1864
Ship	State	Description
Ellen Francis	United Kingdom	The schooner was wrecked at Pennant Point, Nova Scotia, British North America. She was on a voyage from Saint John, New Brunswick, British North America to Liverpool, Lancashire.
Emma	Stettin	The schooner struck a sunken wreck and sank. Five crew were rescued by Edwin (United Kingdom); her captain was reported missing. Emma was on a voyage from Cardiff, Glamorgan, United Kingdom to Memel, Prussia.
Hampton	United Kingdom	The brig was driven ashore at Breaksea Point, Glamorgan. She was on a voyage from Limerick to the Kingroad. She was refloated and resumed her voyage.
Mary J. Williams	United Kingdom	The brigantine was driven ashore at LaHave, Nova Scotia. She was on a voyage from Trinidad to Liverpool.

== 14 October ==
List of shipwrecks: 14 October 1864
Ship	State	Description
Amelia	United Kingdom	The barque was wrecked at Port Neuf, Province of Canada, British North America with the loss of at least ten lives.
Oden	United Kingdom	The ship was wrecked at Port Neuf.
Onward	United Kingdom	The ship was driven ashore near Landskrona, Sweden. She was on a voyage from Hartlepool, County Durham to Malmö, Sweden.

== 15 October ==
List of shipwrecks: 15 October 1864
Ship	State	Description
Castletown	United Kingdom	The lugger was driven ashore at Howth, County Dublin. Her seven crew were rescued by the Howth Lifeboat.
Elizabeth	United Kingdom	The schooner ran aground on the Yellow Sand. She was on a voyage from Hamburg to London. She was refloated and taken in to Hamburg.
Harley	United Kingdom	The brig was lost on the Tillen, in the North Sea. Her crew were rescued. She was on a voyage from Sunderland, County Durham, to Hamburg.
Isabella Heron	United Kingdom	The schooner was driven ashore at "Fahludel", Sweden. She was on a voyage from Riga, Russia to London.
Rhoda	United Kingdom	The steamship departed from Liverpool, Lancashire for Barcelona, Spain. No further trace, presumed foundered with the loss of all fourteen crew.

== 16 October ==
List of shipwrecks: 16 October 1864
Ship	State	Description
Burgermeister	Prussia	The ship ran aground on the Goodwin Sands, Kent, United Kingdom. She was on a voyage from Newport, Monmouthshire, United Kingdom to Kiel. She was refloated and taken in to Ramsgate, Kent.
Carlotta	Italy	The ship was driven ashore east of Almería, Spain. She was on a voyage from Cardiff, Glamorgan, United Kingdom to Genoa.
J. C. Irwin	United States	The 145-ton sternwheel paddle steamer was wrecked by a boiler explosion with the loss of between eight and eleven lives on the Cumberland River at Big Eddy, Kentucky.
Mermaid	United Kingdom	The ship was sunk at Tarifa, Spain by a shot fired from the Centre Battery. Her crew were rescued. She was on a voyage from Cardiff, Glamorgan to Ancona, Papal States.
Tiberius	United Kingdom	The ship was driven ashore on "Gronho", Denmark. She was on a voyage from Middlesbrough, Yorkshire to Riga, Empire. She subsequently became a wreck.

== 17 October ==
List of shipwrecks: 17 October 1864
Ship	State	Description
Flora Berg	United Kingdom	The ship capsized in the Commercial Dock, London.
James Reddin	United Kingdom	The ship ran aground on the Gunfleet Sand, in the North Sea off the coast of Essex. She was on a voyage from London to South Shields, County Durham. She was refloated with the assistance of wo smacks and taken in to Harwich, Essex.
Louise	United Kingdom	The barque was wrecked at "Boltneuf", Province of Canada, British North America. Her crew were rescued.
Melsa	United Kingdom	The steamship was driven ashore at Bermuda. She was refloated and resumed her voyage to Liverpool, Lancashire.
Prince Albert	United Kingdom	The ship was driven ashore on Skagen, Denmark. All on board were rescued. She was on a voyage from Newcastle upon Tyne, Northumberland to Gothenburg, Sweden. She had broken up by 24 October.
Ontario	United Kingdom	The steamship ran aground on the Haisborough Sands, in the North Sea off the coast of Norfolk. Fifty-five people were taken off by the Caistor Lifeboat, which transferred them to a tug. The crew of the Great Yarmouth Lifeboat had refused to launch as tugs had been engaged to save property and they wanted £500 guaranteed before they would launch. They were firmly reminded by the Royal National Lifeboat Institution that their job was to save lives. The crew of the Gorleston Lifeboat also refused to launch unless they were guaranteed £100. Ontario was on her maiden voyage, from the River Tyne to Alexandria, Egypt. She broke in two on 23 October and was a total loss.

== 18 October ==
List of shipwrecks: 18 October 1864
Ship	State	Description
Antoine	United Kingdom	The ship was driven ashore and wrecked at the mouth of the Buffalo River. She was on a voyage from Table Bay to East London, British Kaffraria.
Ballarat	United Kingdom	The barque was wrecked in Table Bay. Her crew were rescued.
Devonda	United Kingdom	The brig was wrecked in Mossel Bay. Her crew were rescued.
Edith Jane	United Kingdom	The ship foundered in the North Sea off Spurn Point, Yorkshire.
Euroclydon	United Kingdom	The steamship ran aground on the Tusakar Rock. She floated off on 21 October and was driven onto the Long Bank, where she broke up the next day. She was on a voyage from Quebec City, Province of Canada, British North America to Liverpool, Lancashire.
Hathaway	United Kingdom	The ship foundered in the North Sea 15 nautical miles (28 km) off Spurn Point, Yorkshire. Her crew were rescued. She was on a voyage from South Shields, County Durham to Alexandria, Egypt.
Orozimbo	United States	The schooner went ashore at Chéticamp, Nova Scotia and became a total loss. Crew saved.
Sea Dog	United Kingdom	The schooner collided with the steamship Dix Decembre (France) and sank in the Gulf of Lyons with the loss of three of her crew.

== 19 October ==
List of shipwrecks: 19 October 1864
Ship	State	Description
Cornelia Terry	Flag unknown	The vessel was lost in Yaquina Bay.
Devonia	United Kingdom	The brig was wrecked in Table Bay.
Georges et Charles	France	The lugger struck the St. Nicholas Rock. She was on a voyage from Nantes, Loire-Inférieure to Campbeltown, Argyllshire, United Kingdom. She consequently put in to Camaret-sur-Mer, Finistère for repairs.
Ida, and Pausewitz	United Kingdom; Grand Duchy of Mecklenburg-Schwerin	Ida ran aground in the River Thames at Gravesend, Kent. She was then run into by Pausewitz; both vessels were run ashore. Ida was on a voyage from London to Shoreham-by-Sea, Sussex.
Lancashire Lass	United Kingdom	The ship departed from Liverpool for "Bucklass". No further trace, presumed foundered with the loss of all hands.
Pitre Anne	United Kingdom	The ship was driven ashore and wrecked at Madras, India.
William Graham	United Kingdom	The ship was wrecked on Arranmore, County Donegal. She was on a voyage from Miramichi, New Brunswick, British North America to Belfast, County Antrim.
W. I. Maclay	United States	The 245-ton sidewheel paddle steamer struck a snag and sank in the Mississippi River downstream of St. Louis, Missouri.

== 20 October ==
List of shipwrecks: 20 October 1864
Ship	State	Description
Betsey	United Kingdom	The sloop was driven ashore and wrecked on Westray, Orkney Islands.
Dolphin	Norway	The sloop was driven ashore and wrecked at Great Yarmouth, Norfolk, United Kingdom. Her four crew were rescued. She was on a voyage from Kristiansand to Harburg.
Dolphin	United Kingdom	The smack was driven ashore west of Speymouth, Moray. She was on a voyage from Lybster, Caithness to a Baltic port. She was a total loss.
HMS Eclipse	Royal Navy	The Cormorant-class gunvessel ran aground at Wellington, New Zealand. She was refloated.
Eliza	United Kingdom	The smack was driven ashore and severely damaged at Burravoe, Shetland Islands.
Highland Mary	United Kingdom	The barque was wrecked at Fleetwood, Lancashire with the loss of all hands. She was refloated the next day.
Laurel	United Kingdom	The fishing boat was driven ashore at Whitehills, Aberdeenshire with the loss of all nine crew.
Liver	United Kingdom	The smack was wrecked off Southport, Lancashire. Her three crew were rescued by the Southport Lifeboat. She was on a voyage from Liverpool, Lancashire to Caernarfon.
Marian	United Kingdom	The smack was driven ashore and wrecked at "Gratners". Shetland Islands.
Neptune	United Kingdom	The ship was driven ashore on Westray.
Rubicon	United Kingdom	The barque foundered in the Atlantic Ocean. Her crew were rescued. She was on a voyage from Sunderland, County Durham, to Sulina, Ottoman Empire.
Son of Rechab	United Kingdom	The sloop was driven ashore between Burghead and Lossiemouth, Moray. Her crew were rescued. She was on a voyage from the River Tyne to Kirkwall, Orkney Islands.
Sylph	United Kingdom	The smack was driven ashore and wrecked at "North Burr", Shetland Islands. Her crew had left her before she came ashore.
Wyvern	United Kingdom	The ship was driven ashore on Westray. She was refloated.

== 21 October ==
List of shipwrecks: 21 October 1864
Ship	State	Description
Abel	United Kingdom	The ship was abandoned in the North Sea. She was on a voyage from Sunderland, County Durham, to Burghead, Aberdeenshire.
Apollo	Greifswald	The schooner foundered in the Skaggerak. One of her eight crew was rescued by the schooner Triglog Prussia).
Black Diamond	United Kingdom	The steamship was beached at Sunderland. Her crew were rescued by rocket apparatus.
Caledonian	United Kingdom	The ship foundered in the North Sea.
Elbe	United Kingdom	The brig ran aground on the Herd Sand, in the North Sea off the coast of County Durham and was wrecked. Her crew were rescued by the North Shields and South Shields Lifeboats. She was on a voyage from Sunderland, County Durham, to Hamburg.
Ellonora	United States	The ship was wrecked in the Atlantic Ocean.
Francis Barclay	United Kingdom	The ship ran aground on the Bahama Bank, in the Irish Sea off the Isle of Man. Her crew were rescued. She was on a voyage from Maryport, Cumberland to Dublin. She was refloated and beached at Ramsey, Isle of Man.
General Ward	United States	The 70-ton screw steamer exploded at Shanghai, China, leaving only one survivor.
Hibernia	United Kingdom	The ship was driven ashore at Kingstown, County Dublin. She was on a voyage from Quebec City, Province of Canada, British North America to Kingstown. She was refloated the next day.
James	United Kingdom	The brig was driven ashore and damaged on Amrum, Duchy of Holstein. She was on a voyage from Sunderland to Hamburg.
Johanna and Heinrich	Danzig	The ship was lost on the Paternosters, in the Baltic Sea with the loss of all hands. She was on a voyage from Bordeaux, Gironde to Danzig.
John Slater	United Kingdom	The schooner was driven ashore at South Shields, County Durham. Her eight crew were rescued by the pleasure boat California (United Kingdom). John Slater was on a voyage from Harburg to South Shields. She was later refloated with assistance from the lifeboat William Wake (United Kingdom) and taken in to South Shields for repairs.
Marianita	Spain	The ship was driven ashore on Anticosti Island, Nova Scotia, British North America. Her crew were rescued on 17 November by the steamship St. Andrew (United Kingdom). Marianita was on a voyage from Havana, Cuba to Quebec City.
Nymph	United Kingdom	The schooner was wrecked 2.5 nautical miles (4.6 km) north of Berwick upon Tweed, Northumberland. Her five crew were rescued. She was on a voyage from Harwich, Essex to Sunderland.
Wilhelm	Prussia	The brig was driven ashore and wrecked at Seaham, County Durham.
Wilhelmina	Wismar	The ship was driven ashore and wrecked at Seaham. Her crew were rescued. She was on a voyage from London to Middlesbrough, Yorkshire, United Kingdom.
Unnamed	(Russian Empire) Grand Duchy of Finland	The ship was driven ashore and wrecked on Stoneskar, Russia with the loss of all but four of her crew.

== 22 October ==
List of shipwrecks: 22 October 1864
Ship	State	Description
British Lion	United Kingdom	The ship foundered off the Cape of Good Hope, Cape Colony. Her crew were rescued by Shannon (United Kingdom). British Lion was on a voyage from London to Madras, India.
Christian	United Kingdom	The ship was driven ashore and wrecked in Blacksod Bay. She was on a voyage from Westport, County Mayo to the Clyde.
Derwent	United Kingdom	The brig ran aground at Hartlepool, County Durham. She was on a voyage from Hartlepool to Erith, Kent. She was refloated and tasken in to Hartlepool.
Excelsior	United Kingdom	The ship ran aground at Point-au-Car, British North America. She was on a voyage from the Clyde to Miramichi, New Brunswick, British North America. She was refloated and taken in to Miramichi.
Flora	United Kingdom	American Civil War, Union blockade: The 437-ton sidewheel paddle steamer, a blockade runner carrying assorted cargo, was run ashore off Charleston, South Carolina, Confederate States of America, by the gunboats USS Mingoe and USS Wamsutta, the armed tug USS Geranium, and picket launches (all United States Navy). She was destroyed by gunfire on 23 October by United States Navy monitors and Union artillery on Morris Island, taking at least 98 hits.
Gaffer	United Kingdom	The fishing boat foundered off the coast of Banffshire with the loss of all eight crew.
Gley	United Kingdom	The fishing boat foundered off the coast of Banffshire with the loss of all six crew.
Hawthorn	United Kingdom	The brig ran aground at Lindisfarne, Northumberland and was severely damaged. She was on a voyage from Sunderland, County Durham, to London.
Industry	United Kingdom	The brig was abandoned in the Atlantic Ocean (47°44′N 7°25′W). Her crew were rescued by the brig Teresina (Italy). Industry was on a voyage from Sulina, Ottoman Empire to Queenstown, County Cork. She was discovered 100 nautical miles (190 km) west of the Isles of Scilly by Chandernagore (United Kingdom), which put a skeleton crew aboard.
John Watson	United Kingdom	The brigantine was driven ashore and sank at the Mumbles, Glamorgan. Her crew were rescued by the brigantine Arab (United Kingdom). John Watson was on a voyage from Southampton, Hampshire to Llanelly, Glamorgan or vice versa.
Lady Maxwell	United Kingdom	The ship was driven ashore and wrecked at Llandudno, Caernarfonshire. Her crew were rescued. She was on a voyage from Caernarfon to Runcorn, Cheshire.
Maid of Erin	United Kingdom	The schooner ran aground at Belfast, County Antrim.
Maria	United Kingdom	The ship foundered in the North Sea. She was on a voyage from London to Amsterdam, North Holland, Netherlands.
Maria Therese	United Kingdom	The ship was driven ashore near and wrecked Mandal, Norway. She was on a voyage from Stettin to an English port.
Patelina	United Kingdom	The ship was abandoned off the Old Head of Kinsale, County Cork. Her crew were rescued by Mayflower (United Kingdom). Patelina was on a voyage from Limerick to Gloucester.
Penby	United Kingdom	The sloop was wrecked off Inchcolm, in the Firth of Clyde. Her crew were rescued. She was on a voyage from Gravelines, Nord, France to the Clyde.
Public	France	The ship was abandoned off Inchcolm, Fife, United Kingdom and sank. She was on a voyage from Dunkirk, Nord to the Clyde.
Scud	United Kingdom	The yacht was driven ashore and severely damaged in Gourock Bay.
Star	United Kingdom	The schooner was driven ashore at Nairn. Her crew were rescued. She was on a voyage from South Shields, County Durham to Gardenstown, Aberdeenshire. She was refloated on 28 October.
Star of the Sea	United Kingdom	The schooner was driven ashore at Dundalk, County Louth. She was on a voyage from Preston, Lancashire to Drogheda, County Louth.
St. Rollox	United Kingdom	The coasting schooner sank at Greenock. Her three crew survived. She was on a voyage from Bowling, Dunbartonshire to Dublin.
Two Sisters	United Kingdom	The sloop was driven ashore at Inverkeithing, Fife. She was on a voyage from St. Monans, Fife to "Carkmanose". She was refloated on 6 November and taken in to Inverkeithing in a severely damaged condition.
Wave	United Kingdom	Wave collided with Soho and another vessel at St. Margaret's Hope, Orkney Islands and was abandoned in a sinking condition. Her crew were rescued by Soho.

== 23 October ==
List of shipwrecks: 23 October 1864
Ship	State	Description
Anne	United Kingdom	The ship was abandoned in the Atlantic Ocean. Her crew were rescued. She was on a voyage from Taganrog, Russia to London.
Annie Lawrie	United Kingdom	The barque was damaged by fire at Quebec City, Province of Canada, British North America.
Bo'ness	United Kingdom	The ship was wrecked at St. Abbs Head, Berwickshire with the loss of all hands.
Esperance	Denmark	The ship was driven ashore and wrecked at Uggerslev. Her crew were rescued. She was on a voyage from Aalborg to London or vice versa.
Flamingo	Confederate States of America	American Civil War, Union blockade: The 283-, 284-, or 446-ton sidewheel paddle steamer ran aground on Sullivan's Island Charleston, South Carolina, Confederate States of America. One source claims she was destroyed there by gunfire from Union artillery at Fort Putnam, Fort Strong, and Battery Chatfield and ships of the South Atlantic Blockading Squadron (United States Navy); another source claims she was refloated, continued to run the Union blockade in 1865, and survived the American Civil War.
Forrest	United Kingdom	The schooner was driven ashore at Lynemouth, Northumberland. Her six crew were rescued by a fishing coble. She was on a voyage from London to Warkworth, Northumberland.
Fortuna	United Kingdom	The schooner was driven ashore at Whitby, Yorkshire. She was refloated on 25 October and taken in to Whitby.
Hope	United Kingdom	The ship was driven from her moorings, collided with another vessel and sank in the Belfast Lough. Her crew survived. She was on a voyage from Ardrossan, Ayrshire to Morecambe, Lancashire.
Julie	United Kingdom	The steamship was driven ashore and wrecked on Saaremaa, Russia. She was on a voyage from Almería and Málaga, Spain to Kronstadt and Saint Petersburg, Russia.
Lucy and Andrew	United Kingdom	The ship was run ashore at the mouth of the Tyne. Her crew survived. She was on a voyage from Montrose, Forfarshire to London.
Napoleon	Sweden	The brig was driven ashore and wrecked in St Andrews Bay with the loss of all eight crew. She was on a voyage from Sunderland, County Durham, United Kingdom to Gothenburg.
Royal William	United Kingdom	The ship was driven ashore and wrecked north of Boulmer, Northumberland. Her crew were rescued. She was on a voyage from Newcastle upon Tyne, Northumberland to Wisbech, Cambridgeshire.
Saphir	Norway	The schooner was abandoned in the North Sea with the loss of one of her crew four crew. Survivors were rescued by the barque Minerva (Prussia). Sapphire was on a voyage from Memel, Prussia to Granton, Lothian, United Kingdom. She came ashore 7 nautical miles (13 km) west of Dunbar, Lothian and was wrecked.
Soho	United Kingdom	The ship was run ashore at Kincardine.
Sultan	United Kingdom	The barque ran aground and was damaged at South Shields, County Durham. She was on a voyage from South Shields to Alexandria, Egypt.
Victor	United Kingdom	The schooner was driven ashore and wrecked at "Werspar", Denmark with the loss of two of her crew. She was on a voyage from Middlesbrough, Yorkshire to Stockholm, Sweden.

== 24 October ==
List of shipwrecks: 24 October 1864
Ship	State	Description
Annabella	United Kingdom	The brig was driven ashore at Jellinge, Denmark. Her crew were rescued. She was on a voyage from Middlesbrough, Yorkshire to Stockholm, Sweden.
Annie Laurie	United Kingdom	The ship was damaged by fire at Quebec City, Province of Canada, British North America.
Bogamilla	United Kingdom	The ship was driven ashore and sank west of Granton, Lothian. Her nine crew survived. She was on a voyage from South Shields, County Durham to Danzig.
Conquest	United Kingdom	The ship foundered off St Abbs Head, Berwickshire with the loss of all hands.
Cruiser	(United Kingdom of Great Britain and Ireland) Isle of Man	The schooner sank in the Belfast Lough with the loss of all hands.
Dorothea	Netherlands	The galiot was driven ashore and wrecked at Granton. Her four crew were rescued. She was on a voyage from London, United Kingdom to Helsingør.
Eliza Hall	United Kingdom	The brig was driven ashore and wrecked at Granton. Her eight crew were rescued by a line thrown from shore, the cutter Princess Royal (United Kingdom) and the steamship Pharos ( Trinity House). Eliza Hall was on a voyage from Gävle, Sweden to London.
Eva	United Kingdom	The schooner was abandoned in the North Sea 50 nautical miles (93 km) off Buchan Ness, Aberdeenshire. Her crew were rescued by the schooner Tyne (United Kingdom).
Formica	United Kingdom	The ship ran ageound on the Longsand, in the North Sea off the coast of Essex. She was on a voyage from Arundel, Sussex to Bristol, Gloucestershire. She was refloated with assistance and resumed her voyage.
Johanna Margaretha	Norway	The brig was driven ashore and wrecked at Granton. Her crew were rescued. She was on a voyage from Dundee, Forfarshire, United Kingdom to Longsund.
Lotus	United Kingdom	The ship capsized, was driven ashore, and wrecked in Mulroy Bay with the loss of all hands.
Louisa	United Kingdom	The ship was driven ashore and wrecked near Dunbar, Lothian. Her crew were rescued. She was on a voyage from the Charente to Leith, Lothian.
Lucrezia	United Kingdom	The ship was driven ashore and wrecked near Dunbar. She was on a voyage from Montrose, Forfarshire to London.
Triton	United Kingdom	The ship was driven ashore and wrecked near Dunbar with the loss of all but one of her crew. She was on a voyage from Rostock to Leith.
Sedig Borg	Sweden	The ship was run into by the Steamship Tasso in the River Tyne and was beached.
Victoria	Denmark	The schooner was driven ashore and wrecked at Granton with the loss of one of her eight crew. She was on a voyage from London to Helsingør.
Viola	United Kingdom	The full-rigged ship was severely damaged at Glasgow, Renfrewshire.
Unnamed	Denmark	The ship was driven ashore and wrecked 6 nautical miles (11 km) east of Dunbar with the loss of four of her five crew.
Unnamed	United Kingdom	The ship ran aground on the Tyne Sands. Her crew were rescued. She was on a voyage from Arbroath, Forfarshire to London.

== 25 October ==
List of shipwrecks: 25 October 1864
Ship	State	Description
Caroline	United Kingdom	The ship collided with the galiot Catherina (Norway) and foundered in the North Sea. Two crew may have been lost. Three crew were rescued by Catharina. Caroline was on a voyage from Lysekil, Norway to Hartlepool, County Durham.
Eentracht	Danzig	The ship was taken in to Egersund, Norway in a derelict condition. She was on a voyage from Danzig to Hartlepool, county Durham, United Kingdom.
Hey-My-Nannie	United Kingdom	The lighter sank at Greenock, Renfrewshire. She was refloated on 1 November.
Estonia	United Kingdom	The ship was driven ashore at Gilleleje, Denmark. She was on a voyage from Hartlepool to Hiiumaa, Russia.
Johann	Danzig	The ship was lost off Marstrand, Sweden. She was on a voyage from Bordeaux, Gironde, France to Danzig.
Lady Matheson	United Kingdom	The ship collided with the full-rigged ship A. B. O. (Russia) off Beachy Head, Sussex and was abandoned. Her crew were rescued by A. B. O. and the barque Friedrich (Flag unknown). Lady Matheson was discovered in a derelict condition by the pilot boat No. 12 (Netherlands). She was taken in to Portsmouth, Hampshire the next day.
Laverock Scott	United Kingdom	The smack was driven ashore at the Davaar Lighthouse, Argyllshire. She was on a voyage from Glasgow, Renfrewshire to Tiree. She was refloated and towed in to Campbeltown in a waterlogged condition.
Mary Wigton	United Kingdom	The ship ran aground at the mouth of the River Tay. She was on a voyage from Dundee, Forfarshire to Sunderland, County Durham. She was refloated and put back to Dundee.

== 26 October ==
List of shipwrecks: 26 October 1864
Ship	State	Description
Agnes	(United Kingdom of Great Britain and Ireland) Virgin Islands	The barque was wrecked 25 nautical miles (46 km) west of St. Jago de Cuba, Cuba. She was on a voyage from Saint Thomas to St. Jago de Cuba.
Ann and Margaret	United Kingdom	The smack was wrecked at Uig, Isle of Lewis. Her crew survived.
Brilliant	United Kingdom	The ship was abandoned in the North Sea. She was on a voyage from Sundsvall, Sweden to "Grochester".
Elizabeth	United Kingdom	The ship was damaged by fire at "Klippen", Sweden.
Kenosha	United States	The 645-ton screw steamer burned at Sarnia, Province of Canada, British North America.
Richmond Packet	United Kingdom	The ship ran aground on the Barber Sand, in the North Sea off the coast of Norfolk. Her six crew were rescued by the Caistor Lifeboat. She was on a voyage from Middlesbrough, Yorkshire to Dunkirk, Nord, France. She subsequently sank.
Sophie McLane, or Sophie McLean	United States	The paddle steamer was sunk by a boiler explosion at Suisun Bay Wharf in California, Confederate States of America with 13 people killed or missing. She was later salvaged.

== 27 October ==
List of shipwrecks: 27 October 1864
Ship	State	Description
Adrian	Flag unknown	The schooner sank off the Norwegian coast. Her crew survived. She was on a voyage from Newcastle upon Tyne, Northumberland, United Kingdom to Turku, Grand Duchy of Finland.
CSS Albemarle	Confederate States Navy	American Civil War: While at anchor in the Roanoke River at Plymouth, North Carolina, the ironclad ram was sunk by a United States Navy launch crew using a spar torpedo. The United States Navy later raised her and repaired her hull, but sold her for scrap without placing her in service.
Hortense	France	The ship was towed in to Weymouth, Dorset, United Kingdom in a capsized condition. She had been on a voyage from Bordeaux, Gironde to Brussels, West Flanders, Belgium. She was righted.
John A. Fisher	United States	The 122-ton sternwheel paddle steamer struck a snag and sank in the Mississippi River at Carroll Island below St. Louis, Missouri.
Ladoga	United Kingdom	The steamship ran aground at Southend-on-Sea, Essex. She was on a voyage from Saint Petersburg, Russia to London. She broke in two the next day.
Laughing Water	United Kingdom	The ship was wrecked at Bonny, Africa.
Marie Louise	Sweden	The schooner ran aground on the Gunfleet Sand, in the North Sea off the coast of Essex. She was on a voyage from Westerwick, Shetland Islands, United Kingdom to London. She was refloated the next day and assisted in to Harwich, Essex.
Ocean Pearl	United States	The medium clipper was driven ashore and wrecked at Tarragona, Spain. Her crew were rescued by Calypso (United Kingdom). Ocean Pearl was on a voyage from New York to Lisbon, Portugal.
Salem	United Kingdom	The barque was abandoned at sea. Her crew were rescued by A. W. Lewis (United Kingdom).
Vulcan	United Kingdom	The ketch ran aground on the Middle Sand, in the North Sea off the coast of Essex. She was on a voyage from Aberdeen to London. She was refloated and put in to Lowestoft, Suffolk in a leaky condition.

== 28 October ==
List of shipwrecks: 28 October 1864
Ship	State	Description
Agnes	United Kingdom	The schooner was driven ashore and wrecked 2 nautical miles (3.7 km) east of Lossiemouth, Moray. Her three crew were rescued by the Lossiemouth Lifeboat.
Amazon	United Kingdom	The ship ran aground off "Rocheseche", France. Her crew were rescued. She was on a voyage from Saint-Nazaire, Loire-Inférieure to London.
Arethusa	United Kingdom	The barque collided with another vessel. She was on a voyage from Memel, Prussia to Newry, County Down. She was driven ashore near the Covesea Skerries Lighthouse, Moray in a capsized condition.
Christine Mathilde	United Kingdom	The ship struck a submerged object and sank at Granton, Lothian.
Comet	United Kingdom	The ship was driven ashore north of Hartlepool, County Durham. Her crew were rescued. She was on a voyage from Hartlepool to Great Yarmouth, Norfolk.
Duahbe	Russia	The ship was driven ashore on Hogland. She was on a voyage from Kronstadt to Grangemouth, Stirlingshire, United Kingdom. She was refloated and towed in to Fredrikshavn, Denmark.
Edith	United Kingdom	The steamship sank at South Shields, County Durham.
Empress	United States	American Civil War: The 854-ton sidewheel paddle steamer was burned on the Mississippi River at Island No. 34 by cavalry under the command of General Nathan Bedford Forrest (Confederate States Army). She also is reported to have struck a snag and broken in two.
Herbert	United Kingdom	The ship was driven ashore and wrecked at Flamborough Head, Yorkshire. Her crew were rescued. She was on a voyage from Rotterdam, South Holland, Netherlands to Sunderland, County Durham.
Kenneth Crowell	United States	The ship collided with Amelia (France) and was abandoned off the Highlands with the loss of a crew member. Survivors were rescued by Amelia. Kenneth Crowell was towed in to Liverpool, Lancashire, United Kingdom on 12 November.
Republic	United Kingdom	The ship was abandoned in the Atlantic Ocean. She was on a voyage from Quebec City, Province of Canada, British North America to London.

== 29 October ==
List of shipwrecks: 29 October 1864
Ship	State	Description
Alina	United States	American Civil War: The 574-ton barque, carrying a cargo of railway iron to Buenos Aires, Argentina, on her maiden voyage, was captured and scuttled in the North Atlantic Ocean by the merchant raider CSS Shenandoah (Confederate States Navy).
Branock	United Kingdom	The brig was driven ashore at Friedrichsort, Prussia. She was on a voyage from Cardiff, Glamorgan to Kiel, Prussia. She was later refloated.
Eliza	United Kingdom	The sloop was wrecked on the Nore. Her crew were rescued by the cutter New Union (United Kingdom).
Jane Avery	United Kingdom	The ship ran aground off Beddingestrand, Sweden. Her crew were rescued. She was on a voyage from Vyborg, Grand Duchy of Finland to London.
Joe	United Kingdom	The steamship was driven ashore at Sandy Hook, New Jersey, United States. She was on a voyage from New York, United States to Matamoros, Mexico.
Maria and Elizabeth	United Kingdom	The schooner was driven ashore at West Point, County Antrim. She was on a voyage from Ardrossan, Ayrshire to Runcorn, Cheshire. She was refloated and taken in to Belfast, County Antrim.
Mazeppa	United States	American Civil War: The 184-ton sternwheel paddle steamer, en route from Cincinnati, Ohio, towing two barges carrying flour, shoes, blankets, arms, hardtack, clothing, and other goods, was abandoned on the west bank of the Tennessee River in Tennessee after she suffered damage from Confederate States Army artillery fire while passing Paris Landing. When United States Navy gunboats approached that night, Confederate forces burned her and the two barges 2 miles (3.2 km) above and across from Fort Henry.
Peri	United Kingdom	The schooner was driven ashore at Cape Spartel, Morocco. Her crew were rescued. She was on a voyage from Newfoundland, British North America to an Italian port. She was refloated in late November and taken in to Tangier, Morocco.
Stevens	United Kingdom	The schooner was wrecked on the Newstone Rock, off Skomer, Pembrokeshire. Her crew were rescued.
Veta	Confederate States of America	The schooner was driven ashore at Stavanger, Norway. She was on a voyage from Hartlepool, County Durham, United Kingdom to Helsinki, Grand Duchy of Finland. She was refloated and taken in to Stavanger.
Warrior	United Kingdom	The barque was driven ashore north of Cullercoats, Northumberland. Her crew were rescued by rocket apparatus. She was on a voyage from Hamburg to Sunderland, County Durham.
Wilhelm	Belgium	The ship collided with General Havelock (United Kingdom) and foundered. Her crew were rescued. She was on a voyage from Cartagena, Spain to Antwerp, Belgium

== 30 October ==
List of shipwrecks: 30 October 1864
Ship	State	Description
Anna	United States	American Civil War: Damaged earlier by artillery batteries under the command of Lieutenant General Nathan Bedford Forrest while passing Paris Landing, Tennessee, on the Tennessee River, the 110-ton sidewheel paddle steamer sank in the Tennessee River before she could reach Paducah, Kentucky.
Benito	United Kingdom	The sloop was run into by the sloop Mazeppe (United Kingdom) and sank at Brixham, Devon. Nobody was aboard either vessel.
Elizabeth (or Isabella)	United Kingdom	The lighter collided with the steamship Moira (United Kingdom) and sank in the Clyde at Greenock, Renfrewshire. Her three crew survived. She was refloated on 6 November and taken in to Greenock.
Ellen Denny	United Kingdom	The steamship ran aground in Gare Loch. She was refloated the next day and taken in to Glasgow, Renfrewshire.
Emily	United Kingdom	The schooner was driven ashore at Burnham Overy Staithe, Norfolk. She was on a voyage from Stralsund to Wells-next-the-Sea, Norfolk. She was refloated on 1 November and taken in to Burnham Overy Staith in a severely leaky condition.
J. H. Ransom	United Kingdom	The ship was wrecked on the Prata Shoal. Her crew were rescued by British Queen (United Kingdom). She was on a voyage from Newport, Monmouthshire to Shanghai, China.
Mark L. Potter	United States	American Civil War: The barque was captured and destroyed by CSS Chickamauga (Confederate States Navy). Her crew were rescued. She was on a voyage from Bangor, Maine to Montevideo, Uruguay.
Maria	United Kingdom	The brig ran aground in the River Wear. She was on a voyage from Sunderland, County Durham, to Ipswich, Suffolk.
Oscar	Norway	The brig ran aground on the Kentish Knock. She was on a voyage from Sundsvall, Sweden to Dover, Kent, United Kingdom. She was refloated and taken in tow, but drove onto the Margate Sand. Her crew were rescued.
Sidney	United Kingdom	The schooner foundered in the Atlantic Ocean. Her crew were rescued by Christian (United Kingdom). Sidney was on a voyage from Newcastle upon Tyne, Northumberland to Huelva, Spain.
Universe	United States	The 399-ton sidewheel paddle steamer struck a snag and sank in the Mississippi River at Plum Point, Tennessee, with the loss of seventeen lives.
Two unidentified barges	United States	American Civil War: The empty barges were captured with the sidewheel paddle steamer Venus (United States) on the Tennessee River at Paris Landing in Tennessee by Confederate States Army forces. They were destroyed.

== 31 October ==
List of shipwrecks: 31 October 1864
Ship	State	Description
Aphrodite	United States	Transporting 510 United States Navy recruits from New York City to the blockading squadrons off the coast of the Confederate States of America in the Atlantic Ocean and Gulf of Mexico, the chartered 1,098-ton screw steamer ran aground on a shoal in Core Sound on the coast of North Carolina, Confederate States of America 12 nautical miles (22 km) north east of Cape Lookout, North Carolina. The armed sidewheel paddle steamers USS Keystone State and USS Shokokon (both United States Navy) arrived on 4 November and rescued Aphrodite′s passengers and crew and removed her cargo. Aphrodite later bilged and broke in two.
David Hughes	United States Army	American Civil War: Carrying government supplies and towing a barge loaded with stores, the steamer was captured and burned by Confederate guerrillas on the Cumberland River 15 nautical miles (28 km) upstream of Clarksville, Tennessee.
Dunleith	United States	The 155-ton sternwheel paddle steamer struck a snag and sank in the Mississippi River at Island No. 67.
Emma L. Hall	United States	American Civil War: The 492-ton barque, carrying a cargo of sugar and molasses from Cárdenas, Cuba, to New York City, was captured and burned in the North Atlantic Ocean off the coast of New York within 50 nautical miles (93 km) of her destination by the merchant raider CSS Chickamauga (Confederate States Navy).
Faedrus Minde	Norway	The ship was wrecked on the Nore. Her crew were rescued. She was on a voyage from London, United Kingdom to Holmestrand.
Jodna	United Kingdom	The barque caught fire in the Atlantic Ocean and was abandoned by her crew. She was on a voyage from Leith, Lothian to Quebec City, Province of Canada, British North America.
Myrtle	United Kingdom	The brig was driven ashore in the Farne Islands, Northumberland.
Shooting Star	United States	American Civil War: The 947-ton full-rigged ship, carrying a cargo of coal, was captured and burned in the North Atlantic Ocean off the coast of New York (39°20′N 70°00′W) by the merchant raider CSS Chickamauga (Confederate States Navy).
Unidentified barge	United States Army	American Civil War: Loaded with stores and under tow by the steamer David Hughes (United States), the barge was captured and burned by Confederate guerrillas on the Cumberland River 15 nautical miles (28 km) upstream of Clarksville, Tennessee.

== Unknown date ==
List of shipwrecks: Unknown date in October 1864
Ship	State	Description
Aden	United Kingdom	The ship was driven ashore near Port Neuf, Province of Canada, British North America. She was on a voyage from Whitehaven, Cumberland to Quebec City, Province of Canada.
Alfred	United Kingdom	The ship foundered in the Mediterranean Sea off Mahón, Menorca, Spain. Her crew were rescued. She was on a voyage from Licata, Sicily, Italy to Falmouth, Cornwall.
Amily	United Kingdom	The screw steamer sank in Lake Erie off Long Point, Province of Canada.
Ann Elizabeth	Norway	The ship collided with John Gilpin (United States) and sank in the Atlantic Ocean.
A. O. Anderson	United Kingdom	The ship was wrecked at Cape Branco, Brazil. She was on a voyage from South Shields, County Durham to Singapore, Straits Settlements.
Armur	United Kingdom	The ship was wrecked near Cape Flattery, Washington Territory. She was on a voyage from the Puget Sound to Amoy, China.
Belina	United Kingdom	The ship ran aground at Paraíba, Brazil. She was refloated three days later and taken in to Paraíba. She was consequently condemned.
Belle Peoria	United States	The sidewheel paddle steamer ran onto a bar in the Missouri River in the Dakota Territory 5 nautical miles (9.3 km) upstream of the mouth of the Cheyenne River.
Blackburn	United Kingdom	The schooner collided with the steamship Warsaw (United Kingdom) and sank in the Elbe. Her crew were rescued. She was on a voyage from Hamburg to Leith, Lothian.
Celeste	United Kingdom	The ship was wrecked at La Maddelina, Sardinia, Italy. She was on a voyage from Cardiff, Glamorgan to Sinope, Ottoman Empire.
Coert Cornelis	France	The ship was driven ashore on "Fallund". She was on a voyage from Saint Petersburg, Russia to Le Havre. Seine-Inférieure.
C.S.M.	Confederate States of America	The steamer sank at a wharf in Mobile Bay, Alabama, in mid-October after a collision with the steamer Mary (Confederate States of America), a guard boat.
Cumberland	United Kingdom	The ship ran aground on the Magdalen Reef on or before 9 October. She was on a voyage from Foochow, China to London. She was refloated and taken in to Singapore in a severely damaged condition.
Danube	United Kingdom	The barque was driven ashore and wrecked on Hogland, Russia. Her crew survived. She was on a voyage from Kronstadt, Russia to Grangemouth, Stirlingshire.
Deodata	Sweden	The ship was abandoned in the North Sea. She was on a voyage from Gävle to London with flax.
Edward	United Kingdom	The ship was driven ashore at "Vliehorst".
Eintracht	Norway	The ship foundered in the North Sea before 26 October.
Eliza Ann	United Kingdom	The ship ran aground on the Coughey Rocks, in Strangford Lough. She was refloated on 6 October and taken in to Strangford, County Down.
Emma	Sweden	The ship foundered in the English Channel off the Isle of Wight before 28 October.
Ernst August	Flag unknown	The ship ran aground off "Ekinos".
Escort	United Kingdom	The ship foundered in the Atlantic Ocean 150 nautical miles (280 km) off Cape St. Vincent, Portugal. Her crew took to a boat; they were rescued three days later. She was on a voyage from Newport, Monmouthshire to Buenos Aires, Argentina.
Forest	United Kingdom	The schooner was wrecked on the Bog Hole Rock, off the coast of Northumberland. Her crew were rescued by a coble.
Fraternitas	Norway	The schooner foundered in the North Sea before 26 October. She was on a voyage from Dundee, Forfarshire, United Kingdom to Brevig.
Gharra	United Kingdom	The ship was abandoned at sea. She was on a voyage from Bangkok, Siam to Hong Kong.
Harlingen	Netherlands	The ship was driven ashore near Fredrikstad, Norway before 26 October. She was on a voyage from Rotterdam, South Holland to Fredrikstad.
Henry Volante	United Kingdom	The ship ran aground and was wrecked at Youghal, County Cork. Her crew were rescued. She was on a voyage from Sydney, New South Wales to Limerick.
Indiaman	United Kingdom	The ship was driven ashore whilst on a voyage from Manila, Spanish East Indies to a British port. She was refloated and taken in to Singapore, Straits Settlements for repairs.
Jenny Bertreux	United Kingdom	The ship was wrecked on the Lark Point Reef, off Tadoussac, Province of Canada with the loss of ten of the fifteen people on board. She was on a voyage from Liverpool, Lancashire to Montreal, Province of Canada. She was refloated on 9 November and taken in to Quebec City, Province of Canada.
Johanna	Bremen	The ship foundered in the Atlantic Ocean before 22 October. Her crew were rescued. She was on a voyage from Seville, Spain to Newcastle upon Tyne, Northumberland, United Kingdom.
Knight Templar	United Kingdom	The ship was lost in the Alas Strait before 22 October. She was on a voyage from Shanghai, China to London.
Lady Monk	United Kingdom	The ship was driven ashore on the coast of Tabasco, Mexico in late October. Her crew, more than 50 people, were rescued.
Leo	United Kingdom	The ship struck a sunken rock off the Kermorvan Lighthouse, Finistère, France. She put in to Le Conquet, Finistère in a severely leaky condition.
Louise	United Kingdom	The ship was driven ashore and wrecked near Port Neuf.
Ludwig	Danzig	The ship sprang a leak and foundered in the North Sea before 24 October. Her crew were rescued by Marie ( Lübeck). Ludwig was on a voyage from Danzig to Sunderland, County Durham, United Kingdom.
Madonna del Carmine	Italy	The ship was wrecked on the coast of Sardinia before 30 October. She was on a voyage from "Gioja" to a British port.
Margaret	Bremen	The ship was driven ashore in the Rabbit Islands, Ottoman Empire. She was on a voyage from Bremen to Constantinople, Ottoman Empire.
Maria	Italy	The ship foundered. She was on a voyage from Amsterdam, North Holland, Netherlands to Naples.
Marianetta	United Kingdom	The ship was driven ashore on Anticosti Island, Nova Scotia, British North America. she was on a voyage from Havana, Cuba to Quebec City.
Merlin	France	The schooner collided with the brigs St. Jean and Vrey (both Spain) and sank off Sanlúcar de Barrameda, Spain. She was on a voyage from Swansea, Glamorgan to Seville, Spain.
Messenger	United Kingdom	The brig was wrecked near Port Neuf. She was on a voyage from Llanelly, Glamorgan to Quebec City. She was refloated in mid-November and towed in to Quebec City.
Mosquito	Hamburg	The brig was wrecked at the mouth of the Yong River. She was on a voyage from Hong Kong to Ningpo, China.
Nelson	United Kingdom	The ship was wrecked at Port Neuf. She was on a voyage from Maryport, Cumberland to Quebec City.
Ocean	United Kingdom	The brig foundered in the North Sea with the loss of all eight crew. She was on a voyage from Hartlepool, County Durham to the Nieuw Diep.
Oeselburen	Norway	The ship foundered in the North Sea before 26 October. Her crew were rescued. She was on a voyage from Jakobstad, Grand Duchy of Finland to Hull, Yorkshire, United Kingdom.
Paona	United Kingdom	The ship was abandoned in the Atlantic Ocean before 10 October.
Queen of the Avon	United Kingdom	The barque ran aground on Shatuiteen Point, China.
Regent	United Kingdom	The ship struck piles and sank. She was on a voyage from Saint Petersburg to Vyborg, Grand Duchy of Finland.
Reval	France	The ship was wrecked on the coast of Spain. She was on a voyage from Marseille, Bouches-du-Rhône to Rio de Janeiro, Brazil.
Rosebud	United Kingdom	The ship ran aground off the south coast of "Amae".
Rudwig	Norway	The ship foundered in the North Sea before 26 October.
Sea Horse	United Kingdom	The ship was lost in the Gaspar Strait. Her crew were rescued. She was on a voyage from Liverpool to Shanghai.
Sea King	United Kingdom	The ship was reported to have foundered in the Atlantic Ocean off the "Desert Isles", between Madeira and Pernambuco, Brazil between 7 and 20 October. Her 42 crew were reported to have been rescued by the steamship Laurel (United Kingdom). Sea King was on a voyage from London to Bombay, India.
Sirius	Norway	The barque ran aground on the Kalkgrund, in the Baltic Sea. She was on a voyage from "Skanvig" to London. She was refloated and towed in to Copenhagen, Denmark, where she arrived on 6 October.
Stoer	Denmark	The ship was lost in the Baltic Sea before 6 October. She was on a voyage from Leith to Saint Petersburg.
Theodore	United Kingdom	The barque was abandoned and set afire in the Atlantic Ocean (50°30′N 30°00′W). Her crew were rescued by the barque Argus and by India (both United Kingdom). Theodore was on a voyage from Quebec City to the Clyde.
Torre del Oro	Spain	The brig was wrecked on the Kentish Knock with the loss of a crew member. Survivors were rescued by a lugger and nine smacks (all United Kingdom). She was on a voyage from Hamburg to Havana, Cuba.
Varuna	United Kingdom	The barque was wrecked in the Magdalen Islands, Nova Scotia. Her crew were rescued. She was on a voyage from A Coruña, Spain to Dalhousie, New Brunswick, British North America.
Wanderer	United Kingdom	The ship was destroyed by fire near Quebec City. Her crew were rescued. She was on a voyage from Leith to Quebec City.
West Wind	United States	American Civil War: Disabled by Confederate States Army artillery fire and captured by Confederate forces, the 350-ton sidewheel paddle steamer was burned by the Confederates on the Missouri River at Glasgow, Missouri, on either 16 or 17 October.
Wilson	(United Kingdom of Great Britain and Ireland) British North America	The schooner foundered in Lake Ontario with the loss of all hands.
Zephyr	United Kingdom	The ship was wrecked on Hickman's Ground. She was on a voyage from Rio de Janeiro to Vyborg.
Three unidentified schooners	Confederate States of America	American Civil War: Confederate forces scuttled the schooners as blockships in the Roanoke River in North Carolina.
