= List of shipwrecks in September 1867 =

The list of shipwrecks in September 1867 includes ships sunk, foundered, grounded, or otherwise lost during September 1867.

== 1 September ==
List of shipwrecks: 1 September 1867
Ship	State	Description
Cuba	Canada	The brig was wrecked at Cape Hatteras, North Carolina, United States with the loss of six of her eight crew. She was on a voyage form Matanzas, Cuba to Boston, Massachusetts, United States.

== 2 September ==
List of shipwrecks: 2 September 1867
Ship	State	Description
Antiope	United Kingdom	The ship capsized at Liverpool, Lancashire.
Rfeid	Prussia	The ship was wrecked at Lemvig, Denmark.
Two Brothers	United Kingdom	The ship sprang a leak and was beached on the Whittaker Sand, in the North Sea off the coast of Essex. Her crew were rescued. She was on a voyage from London to Aldeburgh, Suffolk.

== 3 September ==
List of shipwrecks: 3 September 1867
Ship	State	Description
Broomielaw	United Kingdom	The schooner was wrecked on the Mardens, off the coast of County Antrim. Her crew were rescued. She was on a voyage from Larne, County Antrim to Glasgow, Renfrewshire.
Condor	United Kingdom	The steamship collided with some lighters and sank at the entrance to the Surrey Canal. She was on a voyage from Stockholm, Sweden to London. She was refloated but found to be severely damaged.
Druid	United Kingdom	The steamship sank at Blackwall, Middlesex. She was on a voyage from Kronstadt, Russia to London. She was refloated on 12 September.

== 4 September ==
List of shipwrecks: 4 September 1867
Ship	State	Description
Hound	United Kingdom	The ship was wrecked on Sanda Island, Argyllshire. She was on a voyage from Runcorn, Cheshire to Macduff, Aberdeenshire. She broke up on 7 September.
Offspring	United Kingdom	The ship was run into by Ralph and sank off Ilfracombe, Devon. Her crew were rescued by Ralph.

== 5 September ==
List of shipwrecks: 5 September 1867
Ship	State	Description
Mountain Maid	(United Kingdom of Great Britain and Ireland) New Zealand	The brig was caught on the bar at the mouth of the Buller River and became a total wreck.
Surat	United Kingdom	The steamship ran aground on a reef in the Gulf of Suez 80 nautical miles (150 km) from Suez, Egypt. On 10 September, her passengers were taken off by Nubia (United Kingdom). She was later refloated and taken in to Suez to be drydocked.

== 6 September ==
List of shipwrecks: 6 September 1867
Ship	State	Description
Rocket	United Kingdom	The ship was sighted in the Dardanelles whilst on a voyage from Odesa, Russia to a British port. No further trace, presumed foundered with the loss of all hands.
Union	United Kingdom	The ship foundered. Her crew were rescued by the smack New Lily (United Kingdom). Union was on a voyage from Grimsby, Lincolnshire to London.
Whim	(United Kingdom of Great Britain and Ireland) Royal Engineers' Yacht Club	The yacht capsized and sank in the River Medway with the loss of one of her three crew. Survivors were rescued by the yacht Violet ( (United Kingdom of Great Britain and Ireland) Royal Engineers' Yacht Club).

== 7 September ==
List of shipwrecks: 7 September 1867
Ship	State	Description
Catherine	United Kingdom	The ship was driven ashore. She was on a voyage from Sunderland, County Durham to Southampton, Hampshire. She was refloated and taken in to Ramsgate, Kent in a leaky condition.

== 8 September ==
List of shipwrecks: 8 September 1867
Ship	State	Description
Aden	United Kingdom	The full-rigged ship was driven ashore and damaged in a typhoon at Kowloon, China.
Alexandra	Denmark	The schooner was driven ashore and wrecked in a typhoon at Kowloon.
Bengal	United Kingdom	The ship was severely damaged in a typhoon at Kowloon.
Canton	United Kingdom	The barque was driven ashore and damaged in a typhoon at Kowloon.
Centipede	United Kingdom	The schooner was wrecked at "Domino Run", Labrador, Newfoundland Colony. She was on a voyage form Cádiz, Spain to Saint John, New Brunswick, Canada.
Eagle	United States	The schooner was driven into the steamship Undine (United Kingdom) and sank in a typhoon at Hong Kong. Her crew were rescued.
Enock Benner	United States	The barque foundered off Cape Clear Island, County Cork, United Kingdom. She was on a voyage from Liverpool, Lancashire, United Kingdom to Boston, Massachusetts.
Ettrick	United Kingdom	The barque was damaged in a typhoon at Hong Kong.
Fortitude	United Kingdom	The barque was driven ashore and damaged in a typhoon at Kowloon.
Fort William	United Kingdom	The ship was severely damaged in a typhoon at Kowloon.
Heather Bell	United Kingdom	The ship was severely damaged in a typhoon at Kowloon.
Lintin	China	The steamship was damaged in a typhoon at Kowloon.
Maria	Siam	The schooner was driven ashore and wrecked in a typhoon at Kowloon.
Maria Ross	United Kingdom	The ship was damaged in a typhoon at Hong Kong.
Metis	United Kingdom	The steamboat collided with the collier Wentworth (United Kingdom) and was run ashore in the River Thames at Plumstead, Kent with the loss of four lives. More than 50 survivors were rescued by the tug Swallow (United Kingdom).
Minerva	Spain	The barque sank in a typhoon at Hong Kong with the loss of a crew member.
M. W. Sass	United Kingdom	The ship was damaged in a typhoon at Hong Kong.
Omar Pacha	United Kingdom	The barque was driven ashore and severely damaged in a typhoon at Kowloon.
Preposterous	China	The junk was driven ashore and wrecked in a typhoon at Kowloon.
Re-echo	United Kingdom	The yacht was wrecked in a typhoon at "Yoma-ti", China.
Regina	United Kingdom	The full-rigged ship was severely damaged in a typhoon at Kowloon.
Senator Webber	United Kingdom	The full-rigged ship was severely damaged in a typhoon at Kowloon.
Sowkewan	China	The junk was damaged in a typhoon at Kowloon.
Waterbury	United Kingdom	The ship was severely damaged in a typhoon at Kowloon.
Young Greek	United Kingdom	The ship was severely damaged in a typhoon at Kowloon.

== 9 September ==
List of shipwrecks: 9 September 1867
Ship	State	Description
Amy Douglas	Siam	The barque foundered in the South China Sea in a typhoon with the loss of all but one of her crew. She was on a voyage from Hong Kong to Amoy, China.
Genkai	United Kingdom	The steamship sank in the South China Sea in a typhoon with the loss of 71 lives. She was on a voyage from Hong Kong to Shanghai, China.
Havelock	United Kingdom	The ship departed from Liverpool, Lancashire for Bombay, India. No further trace, presumed foundered with the loss of all hands.
Mogul	Italy	The ship collided with the steamship Egyptian (United Kingdom) and sank at Gallipoli, Ottoman Empire. Her crew were rescued. She was on a voyage from Genoa to Constantinople, Ottoman Empire.
Prospero	United Kingdom	The steamship ran aground on the Lillegrunden, in the Baltic Sea. She was on a voyage from Riga, Russia to Hull, Yorkshire. She was refloated and put in to Copenhagen, Denmark in a leaky condition.

== 10 September ==
List of shipwrecks: 10 September 1867
Ship	State	Description
Active	United Kingdom	The yacht was run down and sunk in the Clyde by the steamship Princess Royal (United Kingdom) with the loss of one live. She was on a voyage from Belfast, County Antrim to the Clyde.

== 11 September ==
List of shipwrecks: 11 September 1867
Ship	State	Description
B. D. de Wolf.	United Kingdom	The ship collided with Saxonia (Hamburg) and sank in the English Channel off Folkestone, Kent. Her crew were rescued. She was on a voyage from Sunderland, County Durham to Cowes, Isle of Wight.
Invincible	United States	The extreme clipper caught fire at Brooklyn, New York. She was beached the next day on Governors Island but was a total loss.
Java, or Tana	United Kingdom	The schooner was wrecked on the Skullmartin Rock with the loss of four of the seven people on board.

== 13 September ==
List of shipwrecks: 13 September 1867
Ship	State	Description
Acadia	United Kingdom	The steamship was driven ashore at Saint John, New Brunswick, Canada.
Ann	United Kingdom	The brig ran aground at Sunderland, County Durham. She was on a voyage from Shoreham-by-Sea to Sunderland. She was refloated and taken in to Sunderland in a severely leaky condition.
Bridesmaid	(United Kingdom of Great Britain and Ireland) Jersey	The ship sprang a leak and was beached on Sark, Channel Islands. She was on a voyage from London to Bayonne, Basses-Pyrénées, France. She was refloated on 3 November and towed in to Saint Helier.
Douglas	United Kingdom	The ship was wrecked off Hope Island, India.

== 14 September ==
List of shipwrecks: 14 September 1867
Ship	State	Description
Sarah Ellen	United Kingdom	The barque was driven ashore at "Houseland", County Waterford and caught fire. She was on a voyage from Newport, Monmouthshire to Waterford.
Silver Light	Canada	The schooner was abandoned in the Atlantic Ocean. Her crew were rescued by Amandajean (United Kingdom). Silver Light was on a voyage from Charlottetown, Prince Edward Island to Londonderry.
Venture	United Kingdom	The schooner ran aground on the Skullmartin Rocks, in the Belfast Lough. Her crew were rescued by HMS Raven (Royal Navy), which towed her off.

== 15 September ==
List of shipwrecks: 15 September 1867
Ship	State	Description
Brésil	France	The steamship collided with the barque Dolphin (United Kingdom) and sank off Rodosto, Ottoman Empire with the loss of sixteen lives. Twenty-five people were rescued by Dolphin, which also lost a crew member.
Chillianwallah	United Kingdom	The ship ran aground on the Pluckington Bank, in Liverpool Bay. She was on a voyage from Quebec City, Canada to Liverpool, Lancashire. She was refloated.
Kerka	United Kingdom	The schooner was driven ashore on the coast of County Antrim. She was on a voyage from Maryport, Cumberland to Dublin.

== 16 September ==
List of shipwrecks: 16 September 1867
Ship	State	Description
Bernhardt	Hamburg	The schooner collided with Maputeo I (France) and was abandoned off Cape Horn, Chile. Four crew were rescued by Maputeo I. Bernhardt was on a voyage from Hamburg and/or Bremen to Panama City, United States of Colombia. She was discovered on 6 October by Arica (United Kingdom), which out four crew on board. They took her in to Queenstown, County Cork, United Kingdom on 31 December.
Forest King	United Kingdom	The ship ran aground at Flores Island, Azores. She was on a voyage from Cardiff, Glamorgan to Montevideo, Uruguay. She was refloated with assistance from HMS Spitfire (Royal Navy) and towed to Montevideo.
Hugh Block	United Kingdom	The brig was wrecked on Flores Island. Her crew were rescued. she was on a voyage from Liverpool, Lancashire to Montevideo.
HMS Malacca	Royal Navy	The corvette ran aground in the Lorenzo Channel. Subsequently refloated, repaired and returned to service.

== 17 September ==
List of shipwrecks: 17 September 1867
Ship	State	Description
Ann	United Kingdom	The schooner was driven ashore at New Romney, Kent.
Elise	Norway	The brig was driven ashore at Varberg, Sweden. She was on a voyage from Gotland, Sweden to Perth, United Kingdom. She was refloated two months later, arriving at Helsingør, Denmark on 21 November.
Favourite	United Kingdom	The barque was wrecked on the Preguias Shoals. Her crew were rescued. She was on a voyage from Cardiff, Glamorgan to Maranhão, Brazil.
Jane and Margaret	United Kingdom	The ship was wrecked at Lindisfarne, Northumberland. Her crew were rescued. She was on a voyage from Sunderland, County Durham to Aberdeen.

== 18 September ==
List of shipwrecks: 18 September 1867
Ship	State	Description
Arabastan	United Kingdom	The ship was wrecked on the Prongs.
Asteria	United Kingdom	The ship was wrecked at Thisted, Denmark. She was on a voyage from Grimsby, Lincolnshire to Copenhagen, Denmark.
Emma	United Kingdom	The ship struck the Grune Rock, in the Channel Islands and sank. She was on a voyage from Newcastle upon Tyne, Northumberland to Morlaix, Finistère, France. She was refloated on 17 November and taken in to Saint Aubin, Jersey.
Fifteen	United Kingdom	The ship was wrecked at Aldeburgh, Suffolk. She was on a voyage from South Shields, County Durham to London.
Lalla Rookh	United Kingdom	The barque caught fire at Montevideo, Uruguay.
Thames	United Kingdom	The ship foundered in the North Sea. She was on a voyage from Hartlepool, County Durham to King's Lynn, Norfolk.

== 19 September ==
List of shipwrecks: 19 September 1867
Ship	State	Description
HMS Doterel	Royal Navy	The Britomart-class gunboat ran aground. She was refloated and returned to service.

== 20 September ==
List of shipwrecks: 20 September 1867
Ship	State	Description
Dean Richmond	United States	The steamboat collided with the steamboat Cornelius Vanderbilt (United States) and sank in the Hudson River at Rondout, New York with the loss of two of her 150 passengers and crew. Survivors were rescued by Cornelius Vanderbilt.
William and Hannah	United Kingdom	The Thames barge collided with the steamship Tees and sank in the River Thames at Blackwall, Middlesex. She was refloated on 26 September and beached at Blackwall Point.

== 22 September ==
List of shipwrecks: 22 September 1867
Ship	State	Description
Barbata	United Kingdom	The ship was driven ashore on Ailsa Craig. Her crew survived. She was on a voyage from Glasgow, Renfrewshire to Demerara, British Guiana. She had become a wreck by 26 September.
West Dock	United Kingdom	The schooner was driven ashore and wrecked on Lundy Island, Devon. Her crew were rescued. She was on a voyage from Dungarvan, County Antrim to Cardiff, Glamorgan.

== 23 September ==
List of shipwrecks: 23 September 1867
Ship	State	Description
Invicta	United Kingdom	The ship departed from Sunderland, County Durham for Alexandria, Egypt. No furthere trace, presumed foundered with the loss of all hands.
Krumpenvaal	Netherlands	The barque was wrecked in Algoa Bay. She was on a voyage from Batavia, Netherlands East Indies to Rotterdam, South Holland.
Unity	United Kingdom	The schooner was wrecked in Sinclair's Bay. She was on a voyage from Thurso, Caithness to Newcastle upon Tyne, Northumberland.
Unity	United Kingdom	The schooner was driven ashore at Winterton-on-Sea, Norfolk. She was on a voyage from Great Yarmouth, Norfolk to Seaham, County Durham. She was refloated on 28 September and towed back to Great Yarmouth for repairs.

== 24 September ==
List of shipwrecks: 24 September 1867
Ship	State	Description
Cuaspad	Colombian National Navy	The steamship foundered 40 nautical miles (74 km) west north west of Port of Spain, Trinidad. Her crew survived. She was on a voyage from London, United Kingdom to Santa Marta.
Hignett	United Kingdom	The ship was wrecked on the Sow and Pigs Rocks, off the coast of Northumberland. She was on a voyage from Rosehearty, Aberdeenshire to Rotterdam, South Holland, Netherlands.
Newbottle	United Kingdom	The ship foundered in the North Sea off Scheveningen, South Holland. Her crew were rescued by the steamship Leo (United Kingdom). Newbottle was on a voyage from South Shields, County Durham to the Nieuw Diep.
Polly	United Kingdom	The brigantine ran aground on the Little Burbo Bank, in Liverpool Bay. She was on a voyage from Dublin to Liverpool, Lancashire. She was refloated and towed in to Liverpool.
Stanley	United Kingdom	The ship was driven ashore and wrecked at Egmond aan Zee, North Holland, Netherlands. She was on a voyage from South Shields, County Durham to Dordrecht, South Holland.
Wanbojeeg	India	The ship was destroyed by fire at Bombay.

== 25 September ==
List of shipwrecks: 25 September 1867
Ship	State	Description
Bandina	United Kingdom	The ship was lost in the Vlie with the loss of all hands. She was on a voyage from Harlingen, Friesland, Netherlands to Newcastle upon Tyne, Northumberland.
Burfield Brothers	United Kingdom	The ship struck a sunken wreck in the North Sea and was damaged. She put in to Harwich, Essex in a severely leaky condition. She was on a voyage from Newcastle upon Tyne to Havre de Grâce, Seine-Inférieure, France.
Dilston	United Kingdom	The ship was driven ashore and wrecked on Hogland, Russia. Her crew were rescued. She was on a voyage from Newcastle upon Tyne to Kronstadt, Russia.
Fleam	United Kingdom	The brig was wrecked on the Longsand, in the North Sea off the coast of Essex. She was on a voyage from Hartlepool, County Durham to Newhaven, Sussex.
Lion	United Kingdom	The brig foundered in the North Sea 30 nautical miles (56 km) off Lowestoft, Suffolk. Her seven crew were rescued by Fearnought and Rosa (both United Kingdom), but four survivors and a sailor from Rosa drowned when their boat capsized.

== 26 September ==
List of shipwrecks: 26 September 1867
Ship	State	Description
Delphin	Prussia	The schooner was driven ashore on Vlieland, Friesland, Netherlands with the loss of all but one of her crew. She was on a voyage from London, United Kingdom to Memel.
Kate	United Kingdom	The ship departed from the River Tyne for a Baltic port. She was subsequently sighted off Helsingør, Denmark but never reached her destination. Presumed foundered with the loss of all hands.
Monnengash	United Kingdom	The barque was driven ashore in Egmont Bay, Prince Edward Island, Canada. She was on a voyage from Miramichi, New Brunswick, Canada to Cardiff, Glamorgan. She was refloated on 30 November and taken in to Charlottetown, Prince Edward Island.
Unnamed	Flag unknown	The schooner was driven ashore and wrecked on Vlieland.

== 27 September ==
List of shipwrecks: 27 September 1867
Ship	State	Description
Alliance	United Kingdom	The brig was abandoned in the North Sea with the loss of four of her seven crew. She was on a voyage from Newcastle upon Tyne, Northumberland to Honfleur, Manche, France. She was subsequently taken in to Great Yarmouth, Norfolk by the smacks Crusoe and Fear Not (both United Kingdom).
Convenzione	Italy	The brig was wrecked at "Beni Ksila". She was on a voyage from London, United Kingdom to Galaţi, Ottoman Empire.
Einigkelt	Hamburg	The ship sank between the mouth of the Elbe and Heligoland. Four of her eight crew were rescued by Hillechina (Netherlands), the others took to a boat; they were reported missing. Einigkelt was on a voyage from Cuxhaven to Sunderland, County Durham, United Kingdom.
Franz Huger	Norway	The barque was driven ashore on Skagen, Denmark. She was on a voyage from Memel, Prussia to Grimsby, Lincolnshire, United Kingdom. She was refloated on 30 September and assisted in to Fredrikshavn, Denmark.
Hannah	United Kingdom	The ship was wrecked at Thisted, Denmark. Her crew were rescued. She was on a voyage from Sunderland, County Durham to Swinemünde, Prussia.
Heatherbell	United Kingdom	The barque was destroyed by fire at Karystos, Negroponte, Greece. Her crew were rescued. She was on a voyage from Leith, Lothian to Constantinople, Ottoman Empire.
Hornet	United Kingdom	The ship was destroyed by fire in the Indian Ocean. Her crew were rescued. She was on a voyage from London to Calcutta, India.
Liberta	Sweden	The ship foundered. She was on a voyage from Gävle to Hull, Yorkshire, United Kingdom.
Mercia	United Kingdom	The ship was wrecked near "Calingapatam", India.
Vesta	United States	The barque foundered off the mouth of the Yangtze.

== 28 September ==
List of shipwrecks: 28 September 1867
Ship	State	Description
Indefatigable	United Kingdom	The barque was wrecked at Batternish Point, Isle of Skye, Outer Hebrides. Five of her fourteen crew were rescued by Islesman (United Kingdom). The rest reached shore in their boat. Indefatigable was on a voyage from Liverpool, Lancashire to Narva and/or Saint Petersburg, Russia.
Lizzie	(United Kingdom of Great Britain and Ireland) New Zealand	The 19-ton cutter was driven ashore and wrecked 8 km north of the mouth of the Manawatu River. All hands were saved.
Panther	United Kingdom	The steamship ran aground on Morups Reef, in the Baltic Sea. Her passengers were taken off. She was on a voyage from Hull, Yorkshire to Saint Petersburg. Panther was refloated on 7 October and taken in to Varberg, Sweden.

== 29 September ==
List of shipwrecks: 29 September 1867
Ship	State	Description
Dunbar Packet	United Kingdom	The ship was driven ashore on Holy Isle in the Firth of Clyde. She was on a voyage from Larne, County Antrim to Ayr.
Echo	United Kingdom	The smack was driven ashore on Holy Isle. She was on a voyage from Holy Isle to Belfast, County Antrim.
St. Jacob	United Kingdom	The ship was driven ashore and wrecked on Skagen, Denmark. She was on a voyage from Liverpool, Lancashire to Danzig.
Star of the East	United States	September gale:The fishing schooner sank on a ledge off Wood Island. Crew saved.

== 30 September ==
List of shipwrecks: 30 September 1867
Ship	State	Description
Andalusia	United Kingdom	The steamship was damaged by fire at Leith, Lothian. She was on a voyage from Bruges, West Flanders, Belgium to Leith.
Andrew	United Kingdom	The schooner was driven ashore and wrecked at Lamberton, Berwickshire. She was on a voyage from Seaham, County Durham to Leith, Lothian.
Ann	United Kingdom	The ship departed from London for Ghent, East Flanders, Belgium. No further trace, presumed foundered with the loss of all hands.
Champion	United Kingdom	The ship ran aground in the Clyde. She was on a voyage from Greenock, Renfrewshire to Quebec City, Canada.
Dunkeld	United Kingdom	The sloop was taken in to Lowestoft, Suffolk in a derelict condition.
Fashon	United States	September gale:The schooner was lost in the Bay of St. Lawrence. lost with all 13 hands.
Invicta	United Kingdom	The barque foundered in the North Sea off the coast of Norfolk with the loss of all hands. She was on her maiden voyage, from Sunderland, County Durham to Alexandria, Egypt.
Lady Franklin	United States	September gale:The schooner went ashore at Malpeque, Prince Edward Island in the gale. Abandoned to the underwriters.
''Marjory	United Kingdom	The schooner was driven ashore and damaged at "Blokhaus", Denmark. Her crew were rescued. She was on a voyage from Middlesbrough, Yorkshire to Riga, Russia. She was refloated on 18 October and towed in to Helsingør, Denmark.
Noord Ster	Netherlands	The ship was driven ashore on Bornholm, Denmark. She was on a voyage from Riga, Russia to Harlingen, Friesland.
Sensitive	France	The schooner ran aground on the St. Nicholas Rocks. She was on a voyage from Nantes, Loire-Inférieure to Dunkirk, Nord.
Water Spirit	United States	September gale:The schooner went ashore at Chéticamp, Nova Scotia, in the gale. Crew saved. Abandoned to the underwriters.

== Unknown date ==
List of shipwrecks: Unknown date in September 1867
Ship	State	Description
Alicanza Americana	Chile	The ship was wrecked at Valparaíso.
Caupolician	Chile	The ship was wrecked 60 nautical miles (110 km) south of "Tongsi".
Celt	(United Kingdom of Great Britain and Ireland) New Zealand	Wreckage of the schooner — which had been en route from Lyttelton to Auckland — was washed ashore on the west coast of New Zealand's North Island on 7 September.
Courrier de Mayagüez	Flag unknown	The ship was wrecked on the Coromandel Coast.
Eliza Goddard	(United Kingdom of Great Britain and Ireland) Victoria	The brig was driven ashore and wrecked in Portland Bay.
El Rayo	Colombian National Navy	The Colombian government screw steamer was blown from her moorings in the harbor at Cartagena in mid-September and wrecked on a coral reef, where she was abandoned.
Gracenti Caprelli	Argentina	The ship was wrecked near Montevideo.
Isabel	Spain	The barque was wrecked on Fernando Po, Spanish Guinea. She was on a voyage from A Coruña to Buenos Aires, Argentina.
Isabella Segunda	Spain	The ship was wrecked on "Basbator Island". She was on a voyage from Manila, Spanish East Indies to Iloilo.
Jane	(United Kingdom of Great Britain and Ireland) Victoria	The brig was driven ashore and wrecked in Portland Bay.
King of Trumps	United Kingdom	The ship was driven ashore at the Port Philip Heads, Victoria.
Lady Robillard	(United Kingdom of Great Britain and Ireland) Victoria	The schooner was driven ashore and wrecked in Portland Bay.
Leah	United Kingdom	The ship struck the Lark Harbour Reef, in the Strait of Belle Isle before 4 September. She was on a voyage from Aberayron, Glamorgan to Quebec City, Canada. She put in to Battle Harbour, Newfoundland Colony in a waterlogged condition.
Liquetto	Spain	The brig caught fire at Newport, Monmouthshire, United Kingdom and was scuttled.
Rafael y Maria	Spain	The ship was wrecked on the "Antigua coast". She was on a voyage from Manila to Iloilo.
Sarah Love	United Kingdom	The ship ran aground at Karak. She was refloated.
Spirit of the Deep	United Kingdom	The ship was wrecked on Pulo Malara in the Strait of Malacca. Her crew survived. She was on a voyage from Penang, Malaya to London.
St. Lucia	United Kingdom	The ship was driven ashore at Manila, Spanish East Indies.
Taurus	Flag unknown	The steamship was wrecked at Vlissingen, Zeeland, Netherlands before 24 September.
Valente II	United Kingdom	The ship was wrecked on Madeira. She was on a voyage from Porto, Portugal to New York, United States.
Yamuna	India	The steamship was wrecked at "Coomfidah", Jeddah Eyalet after 10 September. She was on a voyage from Bombay to Suez, Egypt.
