= John Wilkinson (CSN) =

John Wilkinson was born in Norfolk, Virginia on November 6, 1821. He was a lieutenant and captain in the Confederate States Navy (CSN) during the American Civil War. He was commander of several blockade runners, including the CSS Robert E. Lee and the CSS Chickamauga. For the CSS Robert E. Lee, he persuaded the owner in Scotland to sell it to the CSN for the same price that they had just bought her for. Wilkinson died on December 25, 1891.

== See also ==
- Blockade runners of the American Civil War

== Bibliography ==
- Wilkinson, John (1877). The Narrative of a Blockade-Runner.
  Sheldon & Company, New York. p. 252. ISBN 978-1287791980. Url1 Url2
