= CSS Chickamauga =

Warship

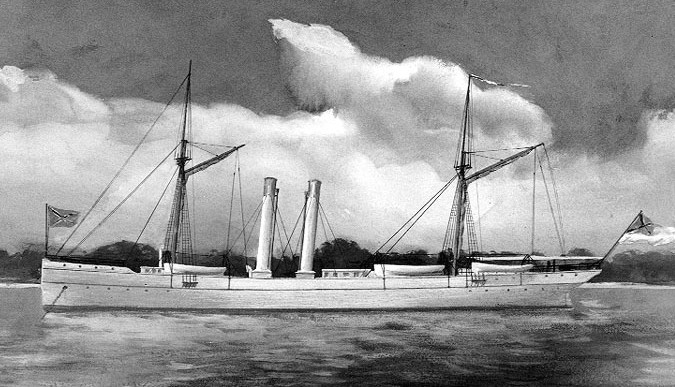
- CSS Chickamauga

History

Confederate States
- Name: Chickamauga
- Commissioned: 1864
- Fate: Burned 25 February 1865

General characteristics
- Displacement: 585 tons
- Propulsion: Steam engine
- Complement: 120 officers and men
- Armament: 3 rifled cannons

CSS Chickamauga, originally the blockade runner Edith, was purchased by the Confederate States Navy at Wilmington, North Carolina, in September 1864. In September, when she was nearly ready for sea, the Confederate Army sought unsuccessfully to retain her at that place for use as a troop and supply transport. On October 28, 1864, she put to sea under Lieutenant John Wilkinson (CSN) for a cruise north to the entrance of Long Island Sound, thence to St. George, Bermuda, for repairs and coal. She took several prizes before returning to Wilmington on November 19.

During the bombardment of Fort Fisher, December 24–25, 1864, a portion of Chickamauga's crew served the guns at the fort. Although not immediately engaged in defense of Fort Fisher, the ship rendered further aid in transporting ammunition. She lent support to the fort when it was bombarded again on January 15, 1865.

After the evacuation of Wilmington, Chickamauga went up the Cape Fear River where she was burned to prevent capture on February 25, 1865.

== Service history ==
The ship, Edith, from Tallahassee, Florida, became the new Confederate cruiser. Its name was CSS Chickamauga. CSS stands for Confederate States Ship. Lieutenant John Wilkinson, who was a lieutenant of the new Confederate Navy, commanded the ship. Wilkinson as he was commanding Chickamauga, ran into the same problems faced by Woods, who was the previous commander. The ship had been a productive blockade runner, but it did not have the qualities needed for a Raider. Chickamauga was fast, but she could only be at sea as long as they had coal supply.

On October 26, Chickamauga set sail for the open sea. After she also grounded on the bar, backed herself free, tried once more again, she finally cleared the obstruction, and made it out into the open sea. Chickamauga was once seen by USS Dumbarton. Dumbarton as well as two more Union ships chased Chickamauga. However, speed saved the ship, and she sailed off into the ocean, once again. US ships reported that another ship, Tallahassee, was sailing out and about again, and was searching for exactly the same thing as what Chickamauga was looking for.

The ship then captured in quick succession the Mark L. Potter, the Emily L. Hall, the Albion Lincoln, and the Shooting Star. All the prisoners were put aboard the Albion Lincoln, while the other vessels were burned. The Lincoln's captain headed straight to New York to raise the alarm, instead of going to Fort Monroe as ordered. On 4 November, Secretary Welles learned that he had to search for another raider, but since he did not know anymore information, he telegraphed Rear Admiral Porter: "It is reported that four privateers are out of Wilmington. Three have actually committed depredations, namely, Tallahassee, Chickamauga, and Olustee." Olustee was actually Tallahassee, but just under a different new name. The next day, Porter ordered to find the raiders, so therefore the nine Union warships could be reunited.

Lieutenant John Wilkinson kept busy, he captured Goodspeed, Otter Rock, and Speedwell. While Porter's ships were trying to find Chickamauga, she sailed down in the Bermuda Triangle looking for coal. Wilkinson, on 15 November, left the Bermuda Triangle and set course towards his homeport. He arrived on 18 November waiting to anchor in safety. Before he reached his haven, four Union blockade ships, USS Clematis, USS Wilderness, USS Cherokee and USS Kansas all fired shots. Chickamauga herself got into the act, but not a single shot from either side ever found a target.

In three weeks Chickamauga had taken only seven ships, Olustee only four. Tallahassee was responsible for capturing more than 55 ships. When the Feds stormed Fort Fisher, it was Chickamauga who took part in this final battle. She then had to retreat up river back to Wilmington, where her crew burned her. Olustee had another name change due to its duties as a blockade runner. and was renamed Chameleon. Lieutenant John Wilkinson took her out to the Bermuda Triangle to provide General Robert E. Lee's armies with food and supplies. After that, he sailed off to Liverpool, and when he got there, Lee surrendered, and the British Government seized his ship.

== See also ==
- Blockade runners of the American Civil War
- Union blockade
