= CSS Robert E. Lee =

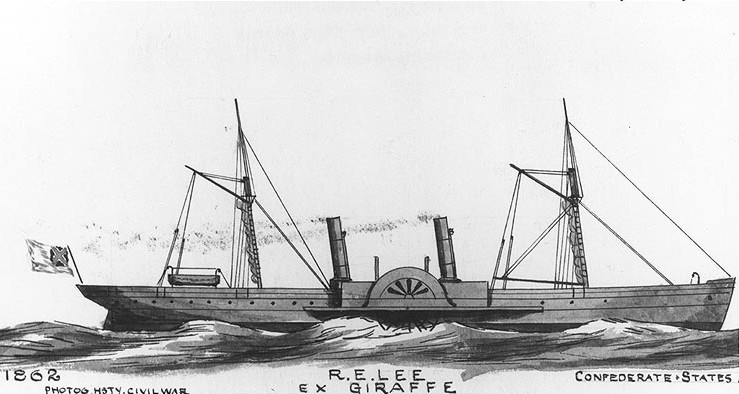
- CSS Robert E. Lee, 1862

History

United Kingdom
- Name: Giraffe
- Owner: J. & G. Burns Line
- Builder: J&G Thomson's Clyde Bank Iron Shipyard, Govan, Glasgow
- Launched: 16 May 1860

Confederate States
- Name: Robert E. Lee
- Operator: Confederate States Navy
- Commissioned: 1862
- Fate: Captured by U.S. Navy, 9 November 1863

United States
- Name: Fort Donelson
- Operator: Union Navy
- Acquired: 9 November 1863
- Commissioned: 29 June 1864
- Decommissioned: 17 August 1865
- Fate: Sold October 1865 and renamed Isabella

Chile
- Name: Concepción
- Acquired: 1866
- Commissioned: 1866
- Decommissioned: 1868
- Fate: Sold 1 May 1868

General characteristics
- Displacement: 900 tons
- Length: 283 ft (86 m)
- Beam: 20 ft (6.1 m)
- Draft: 10 ft (3.0 m)
- Propulsion: Steam engine
- Speed: 13.5 knots (25.0 km/h)
- Armament: 5 × 12-pounder cannons; 2 × 30-pounder cannons

CSS Robert E. Lee was a fast paddle-steamer, originally built as a Glasgow-Belfast packet boat named Giraffe, which was bought as a blockade runner for the Confederate States during the American Civil War, then subsequently served in the United States Navy as USS Fort Donelson and in the Chilean Navy as Concepción.

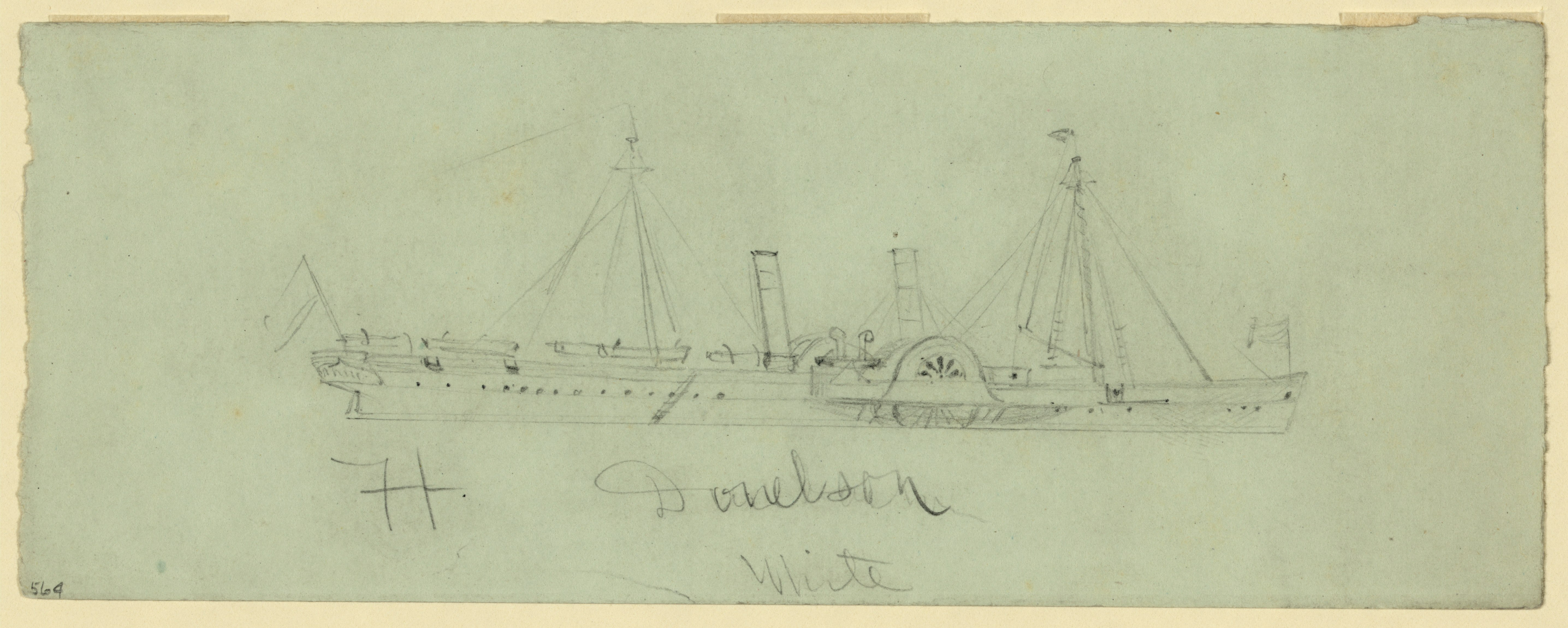
USS Fort Donelson drawing

== CSS Robert E. Lee ==
Robert E. Lee was originally the merchant ship Giraffe, a schooner-rigged, iron-hulled, oscillating-engined paddle-steamer with two stacks, built by J&G Thomson's Clyde Bank Iron Shipyard at Govan in Glasgow, Scotland, and launched on 16 May 1860 as a fast Glasgow-Belfast packet for the J. & G. Burns Line.

Alexander Collie & Co. of Manchester acquired her for their blockade-running fleet, but were persuaded by renowned blockade-runner Lieutenant John Wilkinson (CSN) to sell her to the Confederate States Navy for the same £32,000 just paid.

Her first voyage for the Confederacy was into Old Inlet, Wilmington, North Carolina in January 1863 with valuable munitions and 26 Scottish lithographers, eagerly awaited by the Confederate Government bureau of engraving and printing. On January 26, Union intelligence maintained she "could be captured easily" at anchor in Ossabaw Sound, but this was not to be for another 10 months. Running out again, Robert E. Lee started to establish a near-legendary reputation for blockade running by leaving astern blockader USS Iroquois.

Lieutenant Richard H. Gayle, CSN, assumed command in May 1863, relieving Lieutenant John Wilkinson; but Wilkinson was conning the ship again out of the Cape Fear River from Smithville, North Carolina on October 7, 1863, as recounted by Lieutenant Robert D. Minor, CSN, in a letter to Admiral Franklin Buchanan dated February 2, 1864, detailing the first venture to capture USS Michigan and liberate 2,000 Confederate prisoners at Johnson's Island, Sandusky, Ohio. Robert E. Lee transported Wilkinson, Minor, Lieutenant Benjamin P. Loyall and 19 other naval officers to Halifax, Nova Scotia with $35,000 in gold and a cotton cargo "subsequently sold at Halifax for $76,000 (gold) by the War Department — in all some $111,000 in gold, as the sinews of the expedition."

Thus Wilkinson was in Canada and Gayle commanding when Robert E. Lee's luck ran out on November 9, 1863, after 21 voyages in 10 months carrying out over 7,000 bales of cotton, returning with munitions invaluable to the Confederacy. She left Bermuda five hours after her consort, CSS Cornubia, only to be run down a few hours after her by the same blockader, USS James Adger. The two runners were conceded to be easily "the most noted that ply between Bermuda and Wilmington."

This ship was not the one immortalised in the American popular song Waiting for the Robert E. Lee (1912), which was based on a later Mississippi steamer of the same name.

== USS Fort Donelson ==
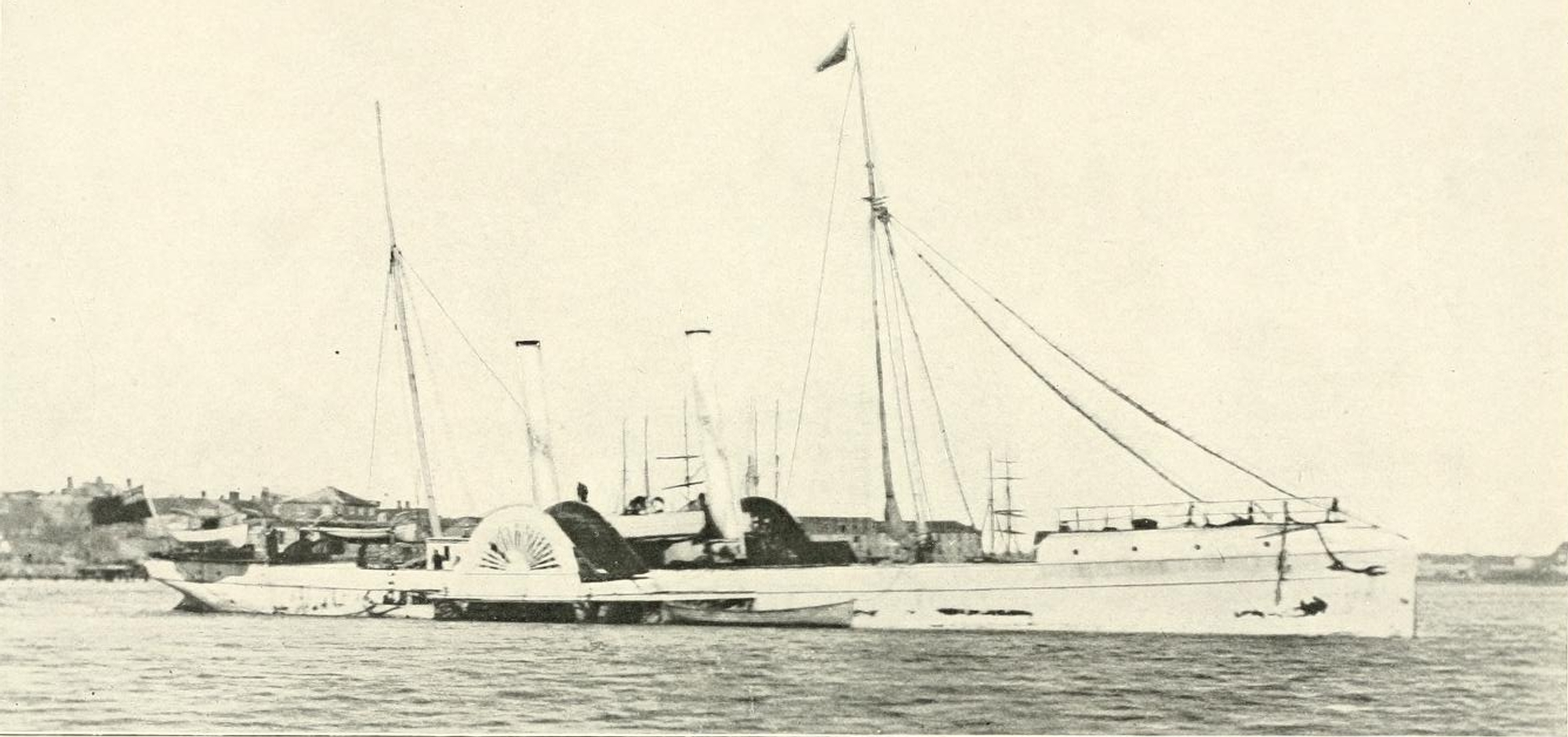
CSS Robert E. Lee

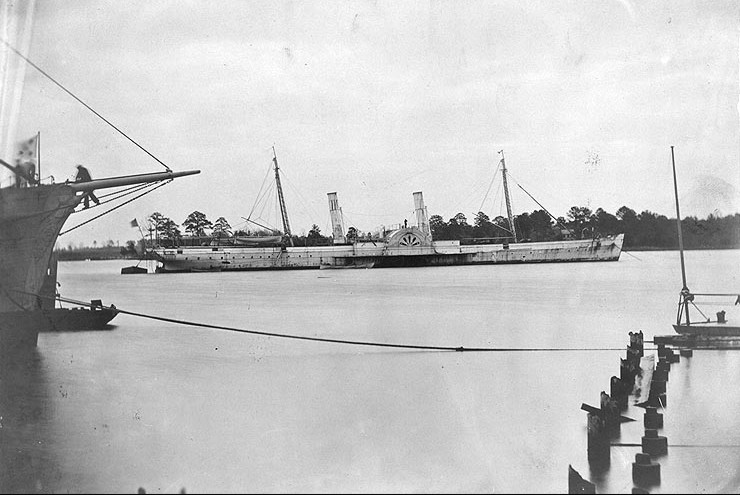
USS Fort Donelson, December 1864

Robert E. Lee was condemned as a prize at Boston, Massachusetts, acquired by the United States Navy and placed in commission on June 29, 1864, as USS Fort Donelson, with Acting Volunteer Lieutenant Thomas Pickering in command.

Fort Donelson was assigned to the North Atlantic Blockading Squadron, cruising in blockade of the North Carolina coast through the remainder of 1864 with brief periods of repair at Norfolk, Virginia. From January 13 to January 22, 1865, she aided in the bombardment of Fort Fisher's batteries and landed ammunition supplies for the Union forces. Fort Donelson joined the fleet in attacking Fort Anderson on February 17–February 18. During March she cruised in company with USS Pequot to Bermuda, was present at City Point, Virginia when U.S. President Abraham Lincoln arrived on board River Queen on March 20, and acted as guardship at Fort Fisher. She operated with the South Atlantic Blockading Squadron until June, but when ordered to the West Gulf squadron was found to be in such poor condition that she returned to Norfolk.

Fort Donelson was decommissioned on August 17, 1865, at Philadelphia, Pennsylvania and sold in October 1865. She subsequently returned to civilian employment under the name Isabella.

== Concepción ==
In 1866 the ship was purchased for $85,000 (~$1.47 million in 2025) by the Chilean Navy and commissioned as Concepción, arriving at Valparaíso on August 22. On September 3, as the Spanish fleet had left the Pacific, after the Chincha Islands War of Chile-Perú against Spain. Commander Galvarino Riveros Cárdenas was placed in command of Concepción, which saw service in southern Chile. The Chilean Navy sold Concepción on May 1, 1868; her subsequent history is unknown.

== See also ==
- Blockade runners of the American Civil War
- Captured ships of the American Civil War
