= USS Dumbarton =

History

United States
- Name: USS Dumbarton
- Commissioned: 13 August 1864
- Decommissioned: 17 February 1865
- Captured: captured by Union Navy, 4 June 1864
- Fate: Sold, 15 October 1867

General characteristics
- Type: Gunboat
- Displacement: 636 long tons (646 t)
- Length: 204 ft (62 m)
- Beam: 29 ft (8.8 m)
- Draft: 10 ft (3.0 m)
- Propulsion: Steam engine; side-wheel propelled
- Speed: 10 knots (12 mph; 19 km/h)
- Armament: 2 × 32-pounder guns; 2 × 12-pounder howitzers

USS Dumbarton was a captured steam operated gunboat acquired by the Union Navy from the prize court during the American Civil War. She was used by the Navy to patrol navigable waterways of the Confederacy to prevent the South from trading with other countries.

== Service history ==
Thistle—a sidewheel steamer—was captured by Fort Jackson on 4 June 1864 while running the blockade off the coast of North Carolina; sent to Boston, Massachusetts, for condemnation; purchased from the prize court on 20 July 1864; renamed Dumbarton; and commissioned on 13 August 1864, Acting Volunteer Lieutenant H. Brown in command. Dumbarton's first assignment was to search for raider CSS Tallahassee along the Atlantic coast. She then joined the North Atlantic Blockading Squadron at Beaufort, North Carolina, and served on the blockade of Wilmington, North Carolina until 6 December 1864. After being at Norfolk Navy Yard, Dumbarton served as flagship of Rear Admiral W. Radford in the James River, Virginia from 17 February-27 March 1865. She was out of commission at Washington Navy Yard until 11 November, when she was taken to New York Navy Yard and placed in ordinary. She was sold there on 15 October 1867.
