= SS Nubia (1854) =

History

United Kingdom
- Name: Nubia (1854–77); Shaftesbury (1877–1906)
- Namesake: Nubia
- Owner: Peninsular and Oriental Steam Navigation Company (1854–77); London Schools Board (1877–1906)
- Port of registry: Birkenhead
- Builder: John Laird Sons & Company
- Launched: 28 February 1854
- Identification: Official number: 25118
- Fate: Scrapped, 1906

General characteristics
- Type: Passenger ship
- Tonnage: 2,200 GRT; 1,033 DWT
- Length: 88.15 m (289.2 ft)
- Beam: 11.58 m (38.0 ft)
- Depth: 8.35 m (27.4 ft)
- Propulsion: Steam turbines, 1,422 ihp (1,060 kW); 1 screw
- Speed: 11 knots (20 km/h; 13 mph)

SS Nubia was a passenger steamer, built by John Laird Sons & Company in Birkenhead in 1854 for the Peninsular and Oriental Steam Navigation Company at a cost of £65,750. It was launched on 28 February 1854 and commenced formal service between Southampton and Alexandria on 4 September 1854. It was briefly used in the Crimean War later that year before continuing operations between Suez and Calcutta, passing through the port of Aden en route. On 5 October 1864, it encountered trouble during a cyclone in Calcutta and was driven ashore near King Oudh's palace and had to be refloated. In September 1867, Nubia rescued the passengers of Surat, which had run aground on a reef in the Gulf of Suez.

From 1870, it was used for delivering freight between Liverpool and Bombay, and then it entered mail service in Alexandria from October 1872–3. In 1873, the ship was deemed unfit for service during an inspection in Galle, but after two months of repairs in Bombay resumed service to Australia. In 1877, the steamer was sold for £8,250 to the London Schools Board. Renamed Shaftesbury she served as a training ship, moored initially at Grays, Essex. On 18 January 1881, she broke from her mooring in a storm and was driven upstream. She came ashore and all 376 people on board were rescued by two tugs. She was refloated and taken to Greenhithe, Kent. The London School Board was abolished in 1904, its responsibilities passing to London County Council. Shaftesbury was discovere to require extensive repairs and it was decided to scrap her. She closed as a school ship in 1905, and was sold in 1906 to Dutch shipbreakers.
