= Brilliant (ship) =

Several vessels have been named Brilliant:

- HMS Brilliant (1757) was a 36-gun Venus-class fifth-rate frigate of the British Royal Navy that saw active service during the Seven Years' War with France. The Navy sold her in 1776 and she became an East Indiaman for the British East India Company. Brilliant was wrecked in August 1782 on the Comoro Islands while transporting troops to India.
- Brilliant (1807 ship) was launched at Whitehaven. Initially, she was a West Indiaman. Then from 1816 she started sailing to India under a license from the British East India Company (EIC). She grounded in February or on 10 March 1821 at Coringa (or Nursapura) while sailing from London to Bengal. She was refloated, repaired, and sold locally.
- Brilliant (1812 ship) was launched in Sweden in 1804, probably under another name, and taken in prize circa 1812. In 1813 two French frigates captured her, but then abandoned her. She was wrecked in December 1840.
- Brilliant (1813 ship) was launched at Whitby. She spent the bulk of her career sailing between London and the Cape of Good Hope (CGH). She became waterlogged while sailing between New Brunswick and Dublin and on 7 February 1823 her crew and passengers had to abandon her.
- Brilliant (1814 ship) was launched at Aberdeen. She made one voyage in 1820 carrying settlers to South Africa. She later traded across the North Atlantic, carrying emigrants from Scotland to Quebec and bringing back lumber. She was last listed in 1849.
- Brilliant (1850 ship) was launched at Aberdeen. She spent her first dozen years carrying passengers to Melbourne from London and bringing back wool and gold. She then started carrying guano and nitrates. She was lost while carrying guano from Callao to London. Her crew abandoned her in the Atlantic on 19 April 1868.

== See also ==
- HMS Brilliant – one of nine vessels by that name
- USS Brilliant - one of two vessels by that name
