= List of shipwrecks in February 1821 =

The list of shipwrecks in February 1821 includes ships sunk, wrecked or otherwise lost during February 1821.

== 1 February ==
List of shipwrecks: 1 February 1821
Ship	State	Description
Charles and Maria	United Kingdom	The ship was lost at Petit Trou, Dominican Republic.

== 2 February ==
List of shipwrecks: 2 February 1821
Ship	State	Description
Britannia	United Kingdom	The ship ran aground and was severely damaged on the Krantsand, in the North Sea. She was on a voyage from London to Hamburg.
General Washington	United Kingdom	The ship was lost in False Bay. Her crew were rescued. She was on a voyage from Liverpool, Lancashire, United Kingdom to Antigua and Virginia.
John Bergwin	United States	The ship was driven ashore in Galway Bay. She was on a voyage from Philadelphia, Pennsylvania to Galway, United Kingdom. John Bergwin was later refloated with assistance from HMS Plumper (Royal Navy).

== 3 February ==
List of shipwrecks: 3 February 1821
Ship	State	Description
Guadeloupe	United Kingdom	The ship was wrecked on the west coast of Coll, Inner Hebrides with the loss of four of the eight people on board. She was on a voyage from Havana, Cuba to Liverpool, Lancashire.
Maria	United Kingdom	The ship foundered in the English Channel 5 leagues (15 nautical miles (28 km)) south east of The Lizard, Cornwall. Her crew survived. She was on a voyage from Cork to London
Minerva	United States	The ship was lost near Edisto Island, South Carolina. Her crew were rescued. She was on a voyage from Rouen, Seine-Inférieure, France to Charleston, South Carolina.

== 5 February ==
List of shipwrecks: 5 February 1821
Ship	State	Description
Eclair D'Anvers	Netherlands	The ship was driven ashore and wrecked in Table Bay with the loss of three of her crew. She was on a voyage from Batavia, Netherlands East Indies to Antwerp.
Kingsmill	United Kingdom	The ship ran aground and was severely damaged on the North Bank, in Liverpool Bay. She was on a voyage from Liverpool, Lancashire, to Valparaíso, Chile. Kingsmill was refloated the next day and taken in to Liverpool.

== 6 February ==
List of shipwrecks: 6 February 1821
Ship	State	Description
Arinus Marinus	Netherlands	The East Indiaman foundered off Christmas Island with the loss of all but five of her crew. She was on a voyage from Batavia, Netherlands East Indies to Rotterdam, South Holland.
Coromandel	United Kingdom	Crew abandoned her off Borneo as she was in a sinking state.

== 7 February ==
List of shipwrecks: 7 February 1821
Ship	State	Description
Hope	United Kingdom	The ship foundered in the Irish Sea off the Isle of Man. Her crew were rescued. She was on a voyage from Dublin to Harrington, Cumberland.
Johns	United Kingdom	The ship was abandoned in the Irish Sea off the Calf of Man, Isle of Man. She was towed in to Peel, Isle of Man the next day. Johns was on a voyage from Dublin to the Clyde.
Jenny	United Kingdom	The sloop was driven ashore and wrecked at Strathaird, Isle of Skye. Her crew were rescued. She was on a voyage from the River Shannon to Glasgow, Renfrewshire.
Restoracion	Spain	The ship ran aground at Tangier, Morocco.

== 8 February ==
List of shipwrecks: 8 February 1821
Ship	State	Description
Abeona	United Kingdom	The ship struck a reef and sank at Corcubión, Spain. Her crew were rescued.
Ann	United Kingdom	The ship was driven ashore at Messina, Sicily. She was later refloated.
Antelope	United Kingdom	The ship was run into by Jane and Mevagissey both (United Kingdom) at Messina and was damaged.
Brothers and Sisters	United Kingdom	The sloop foundered in the North Sea off Ingoldmells, Lincolnshire with the loss of one of the four people on board.
Catalina	Papal States	The ship was driven ashore and wrecked at Terravecchia, Kingdom of the Two Sicilies. All on board were rescued.
Commerce	United Kingdom	The ship was driven ashore near Poole, Dorset. She was on a voyage from Sunderland, County Durham to Weymouth, Dorset. Commerce was later refloated and taken in to Poole.
Countess of Bute	United Kingdom	The ship was wrecked on the Sandy Reef Key. Her crew were rescued. She was on a voyage from Kingston, Jamaica to Montego Bay, Jamaica.
Emma	United Kingdom	The ship was driven ashore at Messina. She was later refloated.
Fama	United Kingdom	The bombard was wrecked off Cape Rosa, Beylik of Tunis. Her crew were rescued.
Jane	United Kingdom	The ship was driven in to Antelope (United Kingdom) and then drove ashore at Messina and was damaged. She was later refloated
Mevagissey	United Kingdom	The ship was driven in to Antelope (United Kingdom) at Messina and was damaged.
Ocean	United Kingdom	The ship was driven ashore and damaged at Messina. She was later refloated.
Orleans	United States	The ship was driven ashore in Delaware Bay.
Princess Charlotte	United Kingdom	The ship ran on to one of the banks on her way from Belize to London but was expected to get off.
Wharfe	United Kingdom	The ship was driven ashore at Messina. She was later refloated.

== 9 February ==
List of shipwrecks: 9 February 1821
Ship	State	Description
Carmilina	United Kingdom	The brig was wrecked at Bizerte, Beylik of Tunis. Her crew were rescued.
Jenny	United Kingdom	The sloop was driven ashore and wrecked at Strathaird, Isle of Skye.
Leda	United Kingdom	The brig was wrecked at Tunis. Her crew were rescued.
San Michael	United Kingdom	The brig was wrecked at Tunis. Four crew were rescued.
Thomas & William	United Kingdom	The schooner sprang a leak and was abandoned off North Foreland, Kent. She was on a voyage from Sunderland, County Durham to Plymouth, Devon. Thomas & William subsequently came ashore at Margate, Kent.

== 10 February ==
List of shipwrecks: 10 February 1821
Ship	State	Description
Auspicious	United Kingdom	The ship struck a rock and sank at New Grimsby, Isles of Scilly. She was on a voyage from London to Waterford. Auspicious was later refloated and taken in to New Grimsby.
Venus	United Kingdom	The ship ran aground at Donaghadee, County Down. She was on a voyage from Dumbarton to Newry, County Antrim.

== 12 February ==
List of shipwrecks: 12 February 1821
Ship	State	Description
Mary	(United Kingdom of Great Britain and Ireland) British North America	The schooner was abandoned in the Atlantic Ocean. Her crew were rescued by Amity (United Kingdom).

== 14 February ==
List of shipwrecks: 14 February 1821
Ship	State	Description
Charles	United States	The ship capsized in the Atlantic Ocean. Her crew were rescued. She was on a voyage from Bath, Maine to Havana, Cuba.
Florianus	Sweden	The ship was wrecked off Malta.
Three Brothers	(United Kingdom of Great Britain and Ireland) Bahamas	The ship was lost off Point Antonio, Jamaica.

== 16 February ==
List of shipwrecks: 16 February 1821
Ship	State	Description
Elizabeth	United States	The ship capsized and sank in a squall. She was on a voyage from Matanzas, Cuba to Boston, Massachusetts.
Malta	United Kingdom	The ship was driven ashore at Galway. She was on a voyage from Liverpool to Galway.
Paragon	United States	The ship was lost at Cape Ann, Massachusetts. Her crew were rescued. She was on a voyage from Havana, Cuba to Wiscasset, Maine.

== 17 February ==
List of shipwrecks: 17 February 1821
Ship	State	Description
Helena	Russia	The ship foundered off Ameland, Friesland, Netherlands. Her crew were rescued. She was on a voyage from Riga to Lisbon, Portugal.

== 19 February ==
List of shipwrecks: 19 February 1821
Ship	State	Description
Hope	United Kingdom	The ship was run down and sunk in the River Thames at Gravesend, Kent.
Mary	United Kingdom	The ship was driven ashore and wrecked in the Vlie. She was on a voyage from Harlingen, Friesland, Netherlands to London.

== 20 February ==
List of shipwrecks: 20 February 1821
Ship	State	Description
Charles	United States	The ship was wrecked at sea whilst on a voyage from Bath, Maine to Havana, Cuba. Her crew were rescued by Leda (United Kingdom.
Carlebury	United Kingdom	The ship was abandoned in the Atlantic Ocean (51°13′N 26°06′W) with the loss of all but two of her crew. The survivors were rescued by Ellen (United Kingdom.

== 22 February ==
List of shipwrecks: 22 February 1821
Ship	State	Description
Mary	United States	The ship was wrecked off Anegada, Virgin Islands. Her crew were rescued. She was on a voyage from New York to St. Thomas, Virgin Islands.

== 24 February ==
List of shipwrecks: 24 February 1821
Ship	State	Description
Peggy and Kitty	United Kingdom	The sloop foundered whilst on a voyage from Newcastle upon Tyne, Northumberland to Bristol, Gloucestershire.

== 25 February ==
List of shipwrecks: 25 February 1821
Ship	State	Description
Good Intent	United Kingdom	The ship caught fire off Lowestoft, Suffolk and was beached.

== 26 February ==
List of shipwrecks: 26 February 1821
Ship	State	Description
Mary	United Kingdom	The ship was driven ashore near Dingle, County Kerry. She was on a voyage from Bahia, Brazil to Liverpool, Lancashire. Mary was refloated on 3 March and taken in to Dingle.

== 27 February ==
List of shipwrecks: 27 February 1821
Ship	State	Description
Atlantic	United Kingdom	The ship sank on the North Bull, Dublin. She was on a voyage from Liverpool, Lancashire to Dublin.
Friend's Increase	United Kingdom	The ship was driven ashore and wrecked on Tiree, Inner Hebrides with the loss of three of her crew, or all hands.
Lowland Lass	United Kingdom	The ship was lost in St. Mary's Bay, Newfoundland. Her crew were rescued. She was on a voyage from Saint John, New Brunswick, British North America to Savanna-la-Mar, Jamaica.
William	United Kingdom	The ship was driven ashore in the Isles of Scilly before 20 February. She was on a voyage from Waterford to London.

== 28 February ==
List of shipwrecks: 28 February 1821
Ship	State	Description
Aid	United Kingdom	The ship was wrecked on Long Island, County Cork. Her crew were rescued She was on a voyage from Stornoway, Isle of Lewis to Sligo.
Haabet	Netherlands	The ship was lost off the coast of Jutland. She was on a voyage from "Frederica" to Amsterdam, North Holland.
Island	Bremen	The ship was driven ashore and sunk by ice at Bremen. She was on a voyage from La Rochelle, Charente-Maritime, France to Bremen.

== Unknown date ==
List of shipwrecks: Unknown date in February 1821
Ship	State	Description
Apropos	Norway	The ship was driven ashore on the Norwegian coast in early February. She was on a voyage from Bergen to Naples, Kingdom of the Two Sicilies. Apropos was later refloated and put back to Bergen.
Brilliant	United Kingdom	The ship was driven ashore at Nursapura, India. All on board were rescued. She was on a voyage from London to Bengal via Madras. Brilliant was later refloated and taken in to Coringo, India. She was subsequently returned to service in July 1822.
Cardillec	Kingdom of the Two Sicilies	The brig was lost off Capo Passero, Sicily. She was on a voyage from Malta to Messina.
Erve	Kingdom of the Two Sicilies	The ship was lost off Augusta, Sicily. She was on a voyage from Corfu, Greece to Messina, Sicily.
Greyhound	United Kingdom	The brig burnt at Rat Island, a small island west of British Bencoolen in February due to an accident with cooking utensils.
Isabella	United Kingdom	The sloop was wrecked near Islandmagee, County Antrim before 7 February. She was on a voyage from Killala, County Louth to Liverpool, Lancashire.
Jane	United Kingdom	The ship was driven ashore near Workington, Cumberland before 5 February. She was refloated on that date.
Johns	United Kingdom	The ship was wrecked on the Tusket Bell Rock. Her crew were rescued. She was on a voyage from Trinidad to Saint John, New Brunswick, British North America.
Oak	United Kingdom	The ship was driven ashore near Harwich, Essex before 14 February. She was on a voyage from Boston, Lincolnshire to London. Oak was refloated on 14 February.
Rose	United Kingdom	The sloop foundered off Shark Island, County Down.
Syren	United States	The ship was driven ashore in Great Egg Harbour Bay. She was on a voyage from Saint Barthélemy to Boston, Massachusetts.
Vine	United Kingdom	The brig was driven ashore on Jura before 3 February.
