= Pride of Baltimore =

Reproduction topsail schooner

Coordinates: 23°00′N 67°00′W

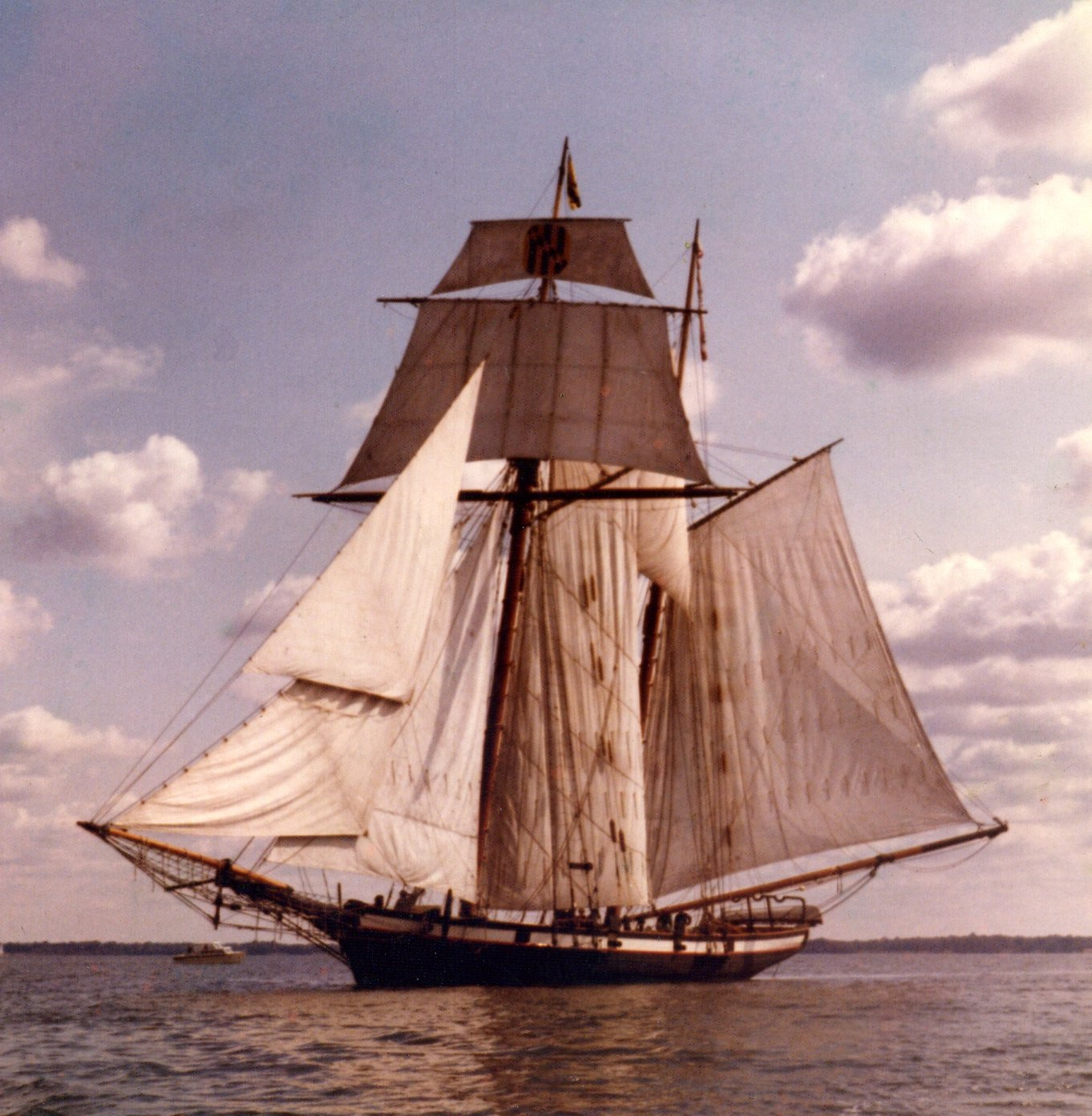
Pride of Baltimore in October 1981

Pride of Baltimore was a reproduction of a typical early 19th-century "Baltimore clipper" topsail schooner, commissioned to represent Baltimore, Maryland. This was a style of vessel made famous by its success as a privateer during the War of 1812 against British merchant shipping. After the end of the war in 1815, Baltimore clippers did not have sufficient cargo capacity for normal merchant trade, so some were used in the illegal American opium trade into China and vessels of the same type were used in the Atlantic slave trade from Africa.

Pride of Baltimore was commissioned on 1 May 1977 by the 44th Mayor of Baltimore, William Donald Schaefer, in an elaborate public ceremony in the historic Inner Harbor watched by thousands of Baltimoreans and Marylanders. She spent nine years at sea logging over 150,000 miles, equivalent to traveling six times around the globe. On 14 May 1986, the Pride of Baltimore was lost at sea in the Caribbean, and her captain and three of the crew died.

The Pride of Baltimore II was commissioned as the successor to the Pride in 1988, sailing in the same Goodwill Ambassador role for the city of Baltimore. Its role has expanded to also representing the State of Maryland. Pride II has sailed over 275,000 miles and visited over 200 ports in 40 countries in its voyages.

== Chasseur: The inspiration for the Pride of Baltimore ==
The Pride of Baltimore was built as an authentic reproduction of an early nineteenth-century "Baltimore clipper" topsail schooner. It was not patterned after any particular vessel, but was rather designed as a typical "Baltimore Clipper" of the type in its heyday. It was indirectly named for the Baltimore-built topsail schooner Chasseur sailed by the privateer captain Thomas Boyle; Chasseur was known as the "Pride of Baltimore" and participated in the War of 1812 (1812–1815).

One of the most famous of the American privateers, Boyle sailed Chasseur out of Baltimore's waterfront historic neighborhood of Fells Point, where she had been launched from Thomas Kemp's shipyard in 1812. On his first voyage as master of Chasseur in 1814, Boyle sailed east to the British Isles, where he harassed British merchant fleet and sent a notice to England by way of a captured merchant vessel declaring that the entire British Isles were under naval blockade by Chasseur alone as a way of demonstrating the folly of "paper blockades". The disruption caused by American privateers such as Chasseur led the British Admiralty to recall many warships of the Royal Navy back to the home waters from the Napoleonic Wars in Europe and more intense real blockade on the American east coast to guard merchant shipping in convoys. Chasseur captured or sank 17 vessels before returning home to Baltimore on 25 March 1815, three months after a peace treaty in Ghent, United Netherlands had been signed ending the War of 1812. Perhaps its most famous accomplishment was the capture of the schooner HMS St Lawrence.

On the Chasseur's return to Baltimore, the national newspaper published in the city, Niles Weekly Register dubbed the vessel, her captain, and crew the "pride of Baltimore" for their achievement.

After the end of the War of 1812, Chasseur was engaged in the China trade. Baltimore clippers were one of the types of clippers used to smuggle opium into China — a trade which was both illegal and highly lucrative. Other Baltimore Clippers, made redundant by the end of the war and of limited cargo carrying capacity, became engaged in the slave trade from Africa.

== Pride of Baltimore ==
History

United States
- Name: Pride of Baltimore
- Owner: City of Baltimore
- Builder: Melbourne Smith/International Historical Watercraft Society
- Laid down: April 1976
- Launched: 27 February 1977
- Commissioned: 1 May 1977
- Home port: Baltimore, Maryland
- Fate: Sunk, 14 May 1986

General characteristics
- Type: Topsail schooner
- Displacement: 129 long tons (131 t)
- Length: 90 ft (27 m) on deck; 79 ft (24 m) w/l
- Beam: 23 ft (7.0 m)
- Draft: 9 ft 9 in (2.97 m)
- Sail plan: 9,327 ft^{2} (866.5 m^{2}) sail area
- Crew: 12

=== Baltimore revival ===
The old municipal piers 1 through 6 along East Pratt Street around the north shore of the former "Basin" of the Northwest Branch of the Patapsco River, now rechristened "Inner Harbor" had been cleared in 1971 of their warehouses and buildings and rebuilt and by 1974, a new Pier 1, renamed "Constellation Dock" was constructed providing a new centerpiece home for the ancient warship sloop-of-war USS Constellation of 1854 to be moored and anchored for future visitors. A brick sidewalk promenade was built around the water's edge on the new extended bulkheads on the west shores along rerouted and rebuilt Light and South Calvert Streets, and the south shore below landmark Federal Hill Park, and running down the sides of the Pratt Street Piers 1–6.

=== Construction and service ===
In 1975, the City of Baltimore adopted a proposal from Charles Center-Inner Harbor Management for the construction of a replica sailing vessel as a centerpiece of the redevelopment of its Inner Harbor. The city requested proposals for "an authentic example of an historic Baltimore Clipper" to be designed and built using "construction materials, methods, tools, and procedures... typical of the period."

A topsail schooner design by Thomas Gillmer was chosen, and master shipwright Melbourne Smith oversaw the construction of the vessel next to the Maryland Science Center on the western shoreline of the Inner Harbor (the historic former "Basin" of the Northwest Branch of the Patapsco River / Baltimore Harbor and Port). During construction, residents and visitors/tourists could watch the craftsmen working with tools and techniques of two centuries earlier. Congresswoman Barbara Mikulski of Baltimore, (who grew up in Fells Point, the nearby waterfront neighborhood where many Baltimore clippers were built 180 years earlier), performed the launching ceremonies on 27 February 1977, only 10 months after the start of construction. Mayor William Donald Schaefer commissioned the Pride of Baltimore on behalf of the citizens of the city of Baltimore and the state of Maryland, two months later on 1 May 1977.

The Pride sailed over 150,000 nautical miles (280,000 km) during its nine years of service, visiting ports along the Eastern Seaboard from Newfoundland to the Florida Keys, the Great Lakes of North America, the Caribbean Sea and the West Coast along the Pacific Ocean from Mexico to British Columbia in Canada. It visited European ports across the Atlantic Ocean in the North Sea, the Baltic Sea and the Mediterranean Sea.

=== Sinking ===
On 14 May 1986, a microburst squall, possibly a white squall, struck the Pride while it was returning from the Caribbean, 250 nautical miles (463 km) north of Puerto Rico. Winds of 80 knots (150 km/h; 92 mph) hit the vessel, capsizing and sinking it. Its captain and three crew died; the remaining eight crewmembers floated in a partially inflated life-raft for four days and seven hours with little food or water until the Norwegian tanker Toro came upon them and rescued them.

A memorial on Rash Field in Baltimore's Inner Harbor memorializes the Pride's captain, Armin Elsaesser 42, and crewmembers Vincent Lazarro, 27, engineer; Barry Duckworth, 29, carpenter; and Nina Schack, 23, seaman.

== Pride of Baltimore II ==
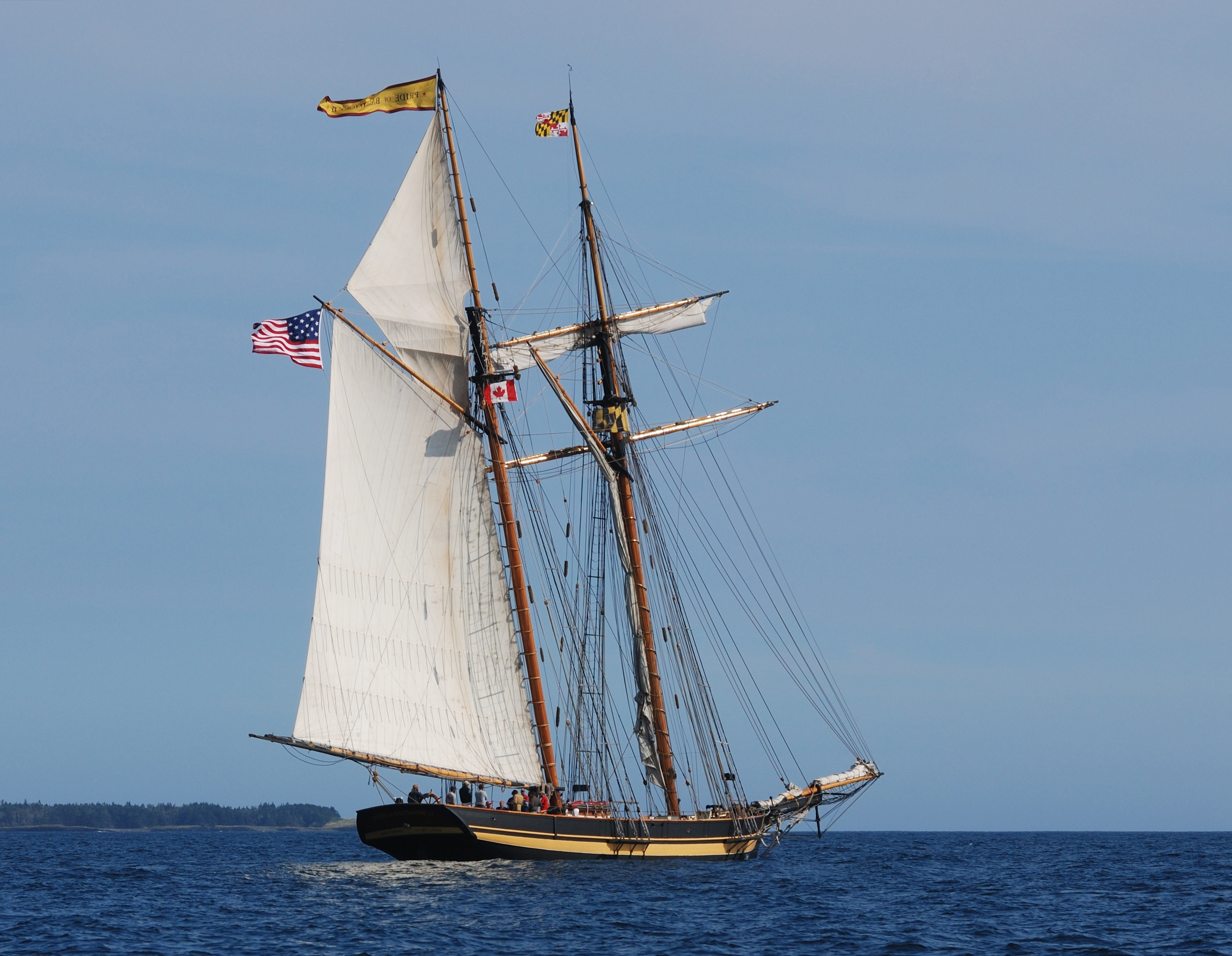
- Pride of Baltimore II in September 2008, Nova Scotia

History

United States
- Name: Pride of Baltimore II
- Owner: Pride of Baltimore, Inc.
- Operator: Pride of Baltimore, Inc.
- Port of registry: U.S.A.
- Builder: G. Peter Boudreau
- Launched: 30 April 1988
- Commissioned: 23 October 1988
- Maiden voyage: 23 October 1988
- Home port: Baltimore, Maryland
- Identification: MMSI number: 303615000
- Nickname(s): "America's Star-Spangled Ambassador"

General characteristics
- Type: Topsail schooner
- Length: 100 ft (30 m) on deck; 157 ft (48 m) sparred length
- Beam: 26 ft 4 in (8.03 m)
- Height: 107 ft (33 m)
- Draft: 12 ft 6 in (3.81 m)
- Propulsion: two 160 horsepower diesel
- Sail plan: 9,018 ft^{2} (837.8 m^{2}) sail area
- Speed: Up to 13 knots
- Crew: 12

=== Origins ===
Baltimore civic society was disappointed with the loss of the Pride of Baltimore, and a campaign to fund a replacement began soon after. After the incident with the microburst, the second ship decided to emphasize safety somewhat more, rather than the original's attempt to be early-19th-century accurate. This meant more modern ship-building techniques were used. In particular, it is larger, has a deeper keel, its bulkheads are watertight, and its engines are more powerful. The Pride of Baltimore II was launched on April 30, 1988.

=== Construction and service ===
Like the original Pride, the Pride II is not a replica of a specific vessel, and, although it represents a type of vessel known as a "Baltimore Clipper", it was built to contemporary standards for seaworthiness and comfort. Like its predecessor, it is a topsail schooner. Built in the "Baltimore Clipper" style, Pride II has heavily raked masts, and has 10 sails, she carries two large gaff sails (one on a boom and one loose-footed), a main gaff topsail, three headsails, and a square topsail and flying topgallant on the foremast. Also rare on modern traditional sailing vessels, it flies studding sails (stun's'ls), additional sails set along the edge of the square topsail and the gaff mainsail on temporary spars known as stun's'l booms. Pride II also carries a very unusual sail known as a ring-tail, set like a studding sail off the main boom and main gaff.

On 5 September 2005, the Pride of Baltimore II suffered a complete dismasting while sailing in a squall in the Bay of Biscay off the western coast of France. The ship returned to port under motor power for repairs and spent over four months rebuilding the rig in St. Nazaire, France.

Until 2010, the Pride of Baltimore II was owned by the citizens of the state of Maryland and operated by Pride of Baltimore, Inc., a private, nonprofit organization. Ownership was transferred to the ship's nonprofit operator with unanimous approval by Maryland's state governmental Board of Public Works on 9 June 2010.

=== Gallery ===
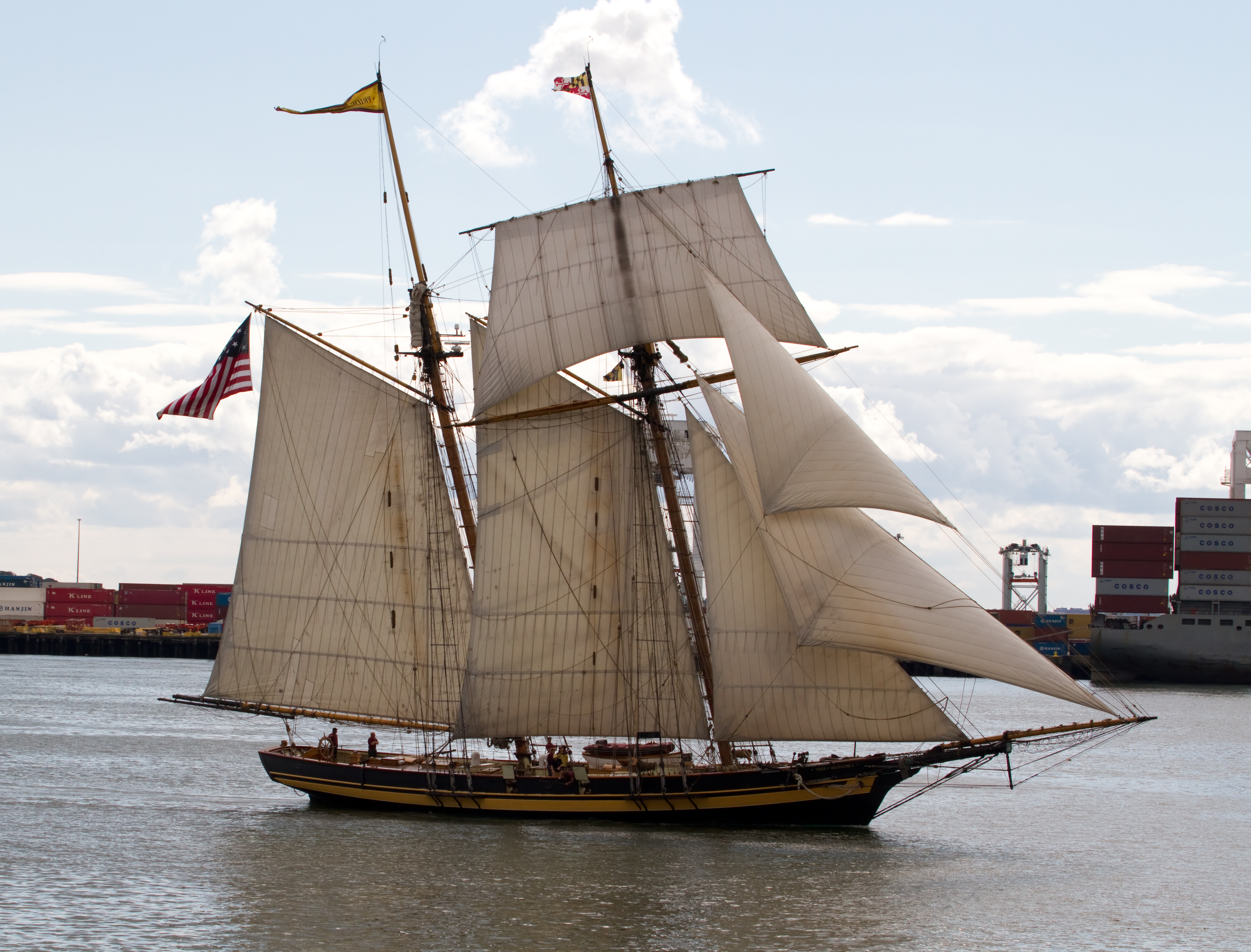
In 2011, in Boston

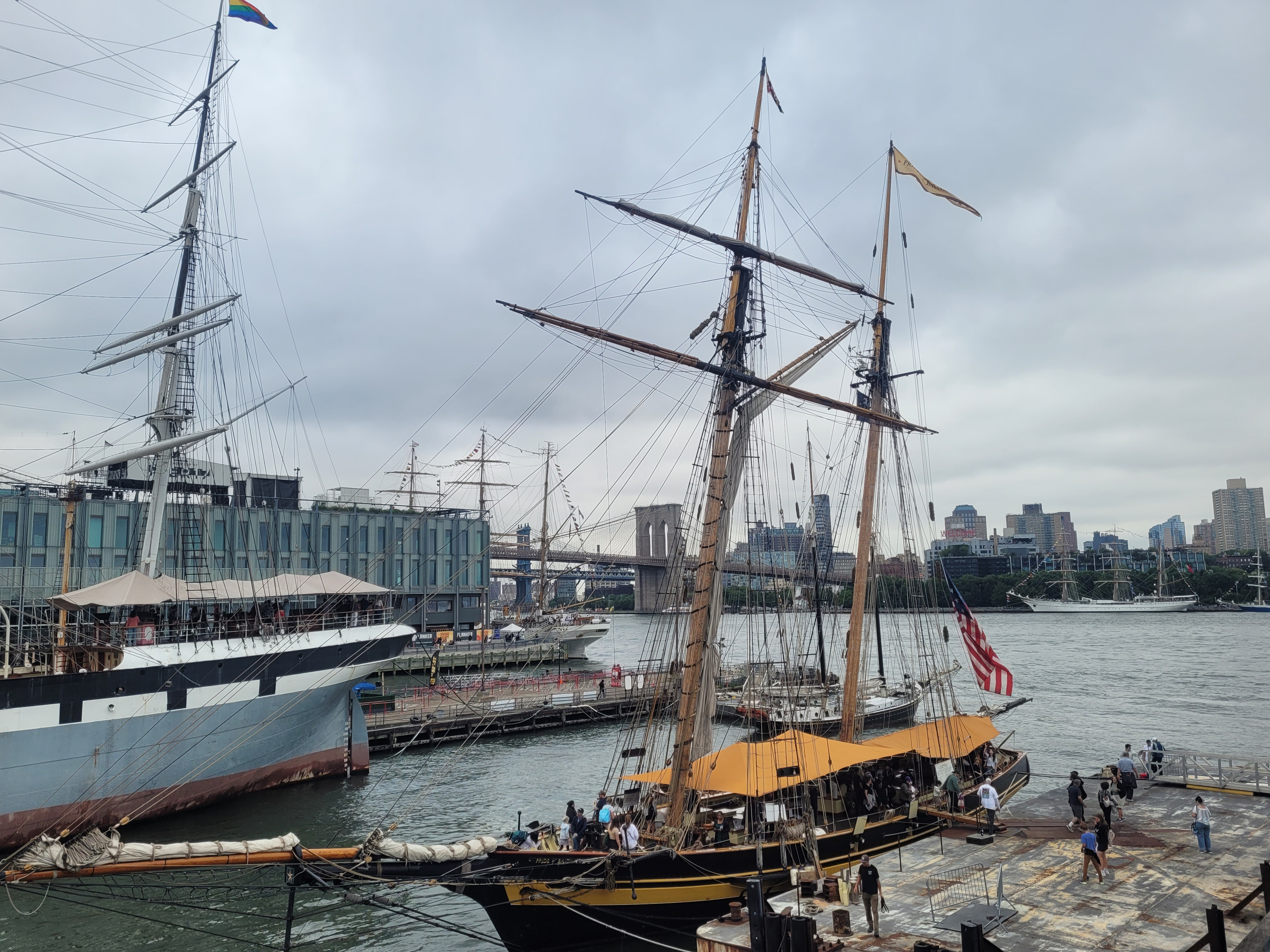
In 2026, for Sail250, at a pier with its sails struck

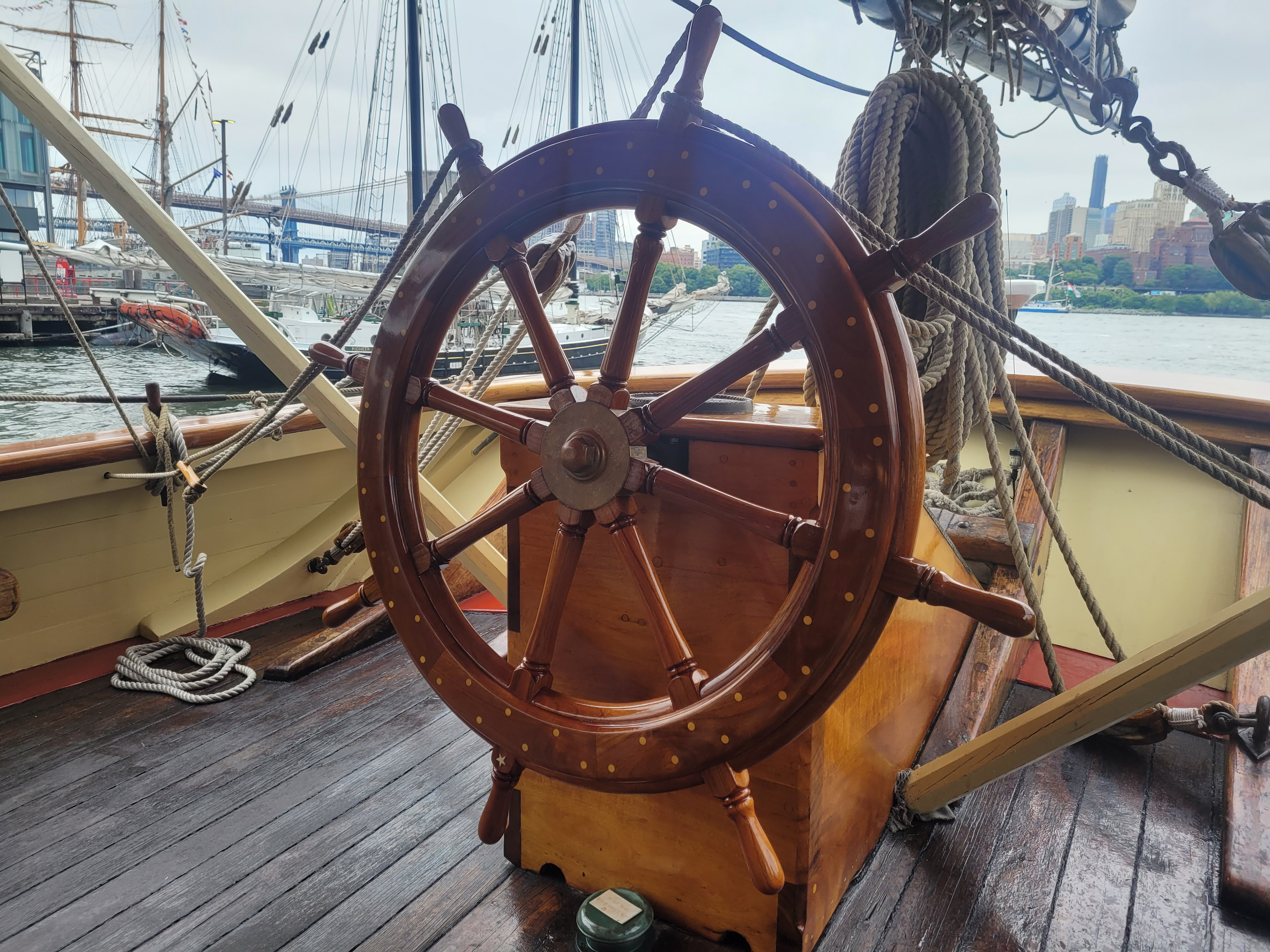
Ship's wheel

== See also ==
- List of schooners
