= Brilliant =

Brilliant may refer to:

== Music ==
- Brilliant (album), a 2012 album by Ultravox
- Brilliant (band), a British pop/rock group active in the 1980s
- "Brilliant" (song), a song by D'espairsRay
- Brilliant Classics, Dutch classical music record label
- Brilliant!, a 1989 album by Kym Mazelle

== Places ==
- Brilliant, British Columbia, a community in Canada
- Brilliant, Alabama, a town in the U.S.
- Brilliant, New Mexico
- Brilliant, Ohio, a town in the U.S.

== Ships ==
- Brilliant (schooner), a schooner at Mystic Seaport in Mystic, Connecticut
- Brilliant (ship)
- HMS Brilliant – one of nine vessels by that name
- USS Brilliant – one of two vessels by that name

== Other uses ==
- Brilliant.org, an educational website
- Brilliant (diamond cut)
- brilliant (typography), the typographic size between diamond and excelsior
- Brilliant (film), a 2004 TV film
- Brilliant!, 1995/96 art show of Young British Artists in Minneapolis and Houston
- The Fast Show or Brilliant!, a BBC series
- Brilliant, a 1950s cartoon character in the Dick Tracy comic strip
- Brilliant, several species of hummingbirds in the genus Heliodoxa.

== People with the name ==
- Ashleigh Brilliant (born 1933), author and syndicated cartoonist
- Dora Brilliant (1880–1907), Ukrainian socialist revolutionary
- Fredda Brilliant (1903–1999), Polish sculptor and actress
- Larry Brilliant, American physician, epidemiologist, technologist, and author
- Varvara Brilliant-Lerman (1888–1954), Russian plant physiologist
- Brilliant Dadashova, Azerbaijani pop singer
- Brilliant Chang, British-based Chinese businessman

== See also ==
- Brillant (disambiguation)
- Brilliance (disambiguation)
- Brilliancy (chess)
