= Sir Charles Forbes (1824 ship) =

History

United Kingdom
- Name: Sir Charles Forbes
- Builder: A.Hall & Co., Aberdeen
- Launched: June 1824
- Fate: Last listed 1861

General characteristics
- Tons burthen: 36373/94, or 364 (bm)
- Length: 104 ft 5 in (31.8 m)
- Beam: 23 ft (7.0 m)

Sir Charles Forbes was a barque built at Aberdeen in 1824. Between 1825 and 1837 she made three voyages transporting convicts to Hobart and one convict voyage to Sydney. In 1842 she made one voyage carrying emigrants from England to New Zealand under the auspices of the New Zealand Company. She was last listed in 1861.

== Career ==
When Alexander Hall contracted to build Sir Charles Forebes, construction costs had fallen to £11/ton burthen, from the £15 10s per ton for Brilliant in 1814. She was described as a "sharp–built ship", having moderately finer lines than was usual for a merchant ship of her time.

Sir Charles Forbes first appeared in Lloyd's Register (LR), in the volume for 1824. It showed her with Fullarton, master, M'Innes, owner, and voyage London–Calcutta.

1st convict voyage (1825): Captain Thomas Fullarton sailed from Portsmouth on 5 January 1825 and arrived at Hobart on 18 April. Sir Charles Forbes had embarked 130 male convicts and had suffered two convict deaths on her voyage. Two officers and 30 men of the 57th Regiment of Foot provided the guard. On 16 June she attempted to sail but grounded and had to put back for repairs. Still, on 21 June she sailed for Calcutta.

2nd convict voyage (1826–1827): Captain Alexander Duthie sailed from London on 16 September 1826 and arrived at Hobart on 3 January 1827. Sir Charles Forbes had embarked 73 female convicts and had suffered four convict deaths on her voyage.

3rd convict voyage (1830): Captain J. Leslie sailed from Plymouth on 5 April 1830 and arrived at Hobart on 27 July. Sir Charles Forbes had embarked 160 male convicts and had suffered two convict deaths on her voyage. The guard consisted of one officer, plus 29 other ranks, primarily from the 17th Regiment of Foot. The regiment later participated in two documented massacres of Aborigines.

4th convict voyage (1837): Captain Leslie sailed from Dublin on 11 August 1837 and arrived at Sydney on 25 December. Sir Charles Forbes had embarked 148 female convicts and had suffered one convict death on her voyage.

New Zealand immigrants (1842): Captain Thomas Bacon from Gravesend on 1 May 1842 and arrived at Nelson on 22 August. Sir Charles Forbes carried 187 settlers.

== Fate ==
Sir Charles Forbes was last listed in 1861. She had not had any voyages listed for some years before that.
