= Pursuit (ship) =

Several vessels have been named Pursuit:

- Pursuit (1795 ship) was launched at Whitby in 1795. She made two voyages for the British East India Company and then traded with the West Indies. She repelled one attack by a French privateer that caused severe casualties, but eventually an American privateer captured her in August 1812.
- Pursuit (1800 ship), of 192 tons (bm), was launched by R & J Bulmer, South Shields, in 1800. She first appeared in Lloyd's Register (LR) in the volume for 1803, trading with the Baltic. She later began trading across the Atlantic. Lloyd's List reported at end-September 1812 that as Pursuit, Stroud, master, was sailing from Poole to New Brunswick, a United States privateer captured her and sent her to the United States. The privateer was Rapid, of Portland. Lloyd's Register for 1813 carried the annotation "captured" under Pursuit's name. (Note: HMS Maidstone captured Rapid on 17 October 1812. The Royal Navy took Rapid into service as HMS Nova Scotia.)

== See also ==
- USS Pursuit (1861) was a 600-ton barque purchased at New York on 3 September 1861 and was commissioned on 17 December 1861.
- USS Pursuit (AM-108) was a U.S. Navy metal-hulled minesweeper commissioned 30 April 1943.
