= Rossie (1807 ship) =

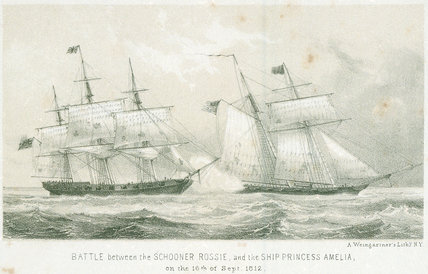
- Rossie and Princess Amelia, 1812, by Adam Weingartner, c. 1856

History

United States
- Name: Rossie
- Owner: First letter of marque:John McKim Jr., Thos. Tenant, Robt. Patterson, Andrew Clopper, Levi Hollingsworth, Jas. Partridge,, Christopher Deshon, Jas. Briscoe, August & Frederick Schwaetse & Jeremiah Sullivan; Second letter of marque:John N. D'Arcy & Henry Didier, Jr.
- Builder: Thomas Kemp, Fells Point, Baltimore
- Launched: 1807
- Captured: 6 January 1813

General characteristics
- Type: schooner
- Tons burthen: 206, or 208 (bm)
- Length: 97 ft 6 in (29.7 m) (overall); 70 ft 0 in (21.3 m) (keel)
- Beam: 23 ft 6 in (7.2 m)
- Depth of hold: 10 ft 0 in (3.0 m)
- Complement: First letter of marque:100 officers and men; Second letter of marque:35 officers and men
- Armament: First letter of marque: 1 × long 9-pounder gun + 11 × 12-pounder carronades; Second letter of marque: 1 × long 9-pounder gun + 4 × 12-pounder carronades

Rossie was a schooner launched at Baltimore in 1807. At the outbreak of the War of 1812 she became a privateer, operating under a letter of marque. She made two voyages, the first as a privateer, and the less successful second as a letter of marque. The British captured her in January 1813.

== Construction ==
Thomas Kemp of Fell's Point, Baltimore, built and launched her. He would go to build several other schooners that would become among the most successful privateer of the war, such as Chasseur.

== First letter of marque ==
Rossie was commissioned on 11 July 1812, right at the outbreak of the war. Her owners hired Joshua Barney as her captain and Silvanus Long as her first lieutenant. She had letter of marque #1. On her first cruise under Barney she captured some 18 vessels in six weeks off Nova Scotia and Newfoundland. Barney then put in at Newport, Rhode Island, on 30 August. He replenished his supplies and then cruised southward. On his cruise, Barney thrice out-sailed British frigates. He engaged in two actions, the first with the Jenny (or Jeanie), of 12 guns. He captured her and did not report any casualties. Lloyd's List reported that Rossie's prize, Jane, of 12 guns, carrying 20,000 bushels of salt, had arrived in Newport on 5 September. Rossie also captured the brig Nymphe, Patch, master, which had been sailing from the West Indies, and carried her into Boston.

Name	Type	Fate
Brothers	Brig	Cartel
Kitty	Ship	Recaptured
Devonshire	Brig	Burnt
Merrimack	Ship	Sent in (US)
Euphrates	Ship	New Bedford (US) (Note: The designation "US" means the vessel was either an American vessel recaptured from the British, or one operating in violation of the Non-importation Act.)
Nymph	Brig	Boston
Fame	Brig	Burnt
Princess Amelia	Brig	Savannah
Halifax	Schooner	Burnt
Princess Royal	Ship	Burnt
Henry	Brig	Sunk
Race Horse	Schooner	Sunk
Hetty	Ship	Sent in
Rebecca	Brig	New London (US)
Jane	Ship	Newport
Squid	Schooner	Burnt
Jenny	Ship	Salem
Two Brothers	Schooner	Cartel
	Schooner	Sent in
William	Brig	New York

Rossie captured Kitty, Thompson, master, on 31 July as she was sailing from Greenock to New Brunswick. On 1 August Rossie captured the brig Two Brothers, and burnt four "Bankers", loaded with fish. Three days later, HMS Pomone recaptured Kitty and sent her into Newfoundland.

It was on the second leg of the cruise that Rossie's most famous action took place. On 16 September 1812 she captured the Post Office Packet Service packet ship Princess Amelia. At the time Rossie was armed with ten 12-pounder guns and one long 9-pounder on a pivot, and had a crew of 95; Princess Amelia was armed with four 6-pounders and two 9-pounders, and had a crew of 27 or 28. Princess Amelia had to strike after she had lost three men killed, including her captain, Isaac Moorsom, and her sailing master, John Nankevell, and 11 men wounded. (Note: Lloyd's List gave the number of dead as two, Moorsom and a boy, and the number of wounded as ten, including the mate.) (Some of the wounded may have died later as a report on her arrival in Savannah gives her casualties as six dead and six or seven wounded.) American casualties were seven men wounded, one of them, Sylvanus Long, severely. Barney sent Princess Amelia into Savannah, Georgia, where the US Navy bought her and named her USS Troup.

Barney returned to Baltimore on 11 October. Merrimack, Cook, master, which had been sailing from Liverpool when Rossie captured her, arrived 12 days later.

Barney estimated that on this voyage he had captured 3698 tons of British shipping, worth US$1.5 million. He also had captured 217 prisoners. Of course, it helped that many of the vessels that he captured did not know that the war had begun.

== Second letter of marque ==
Rossie was commissioned on 3 December 1812 with J. D. Daniels as captain and James Stubbs as first lieutenant. The Royal Navy's Rochfort squadron captured her on 6 January 1813 in the Basque Roads. She was carrying coffee from Baltimore to Bordeaux, and the announcement of her capture states that she had only one gun. The actual captor appears to have been HMS Dryad. Rossie arrived in Plymouth on 17 January 1813. (Note: Lloyd's List gives her name as Ross and her captor as Dryade.) Eight ships of the Royal Navy were in sight at the capture, as was the British privateer Chance.
