= Aucellina Point =

Aucellina Point (54°12′S 37°24′W) is a small headland 1.6 miles (2.6 km) southeast of Cape Rosa on the south coast of South Georgia. It was named in 1982 by the UK Antarctic Place-Names Committee after a mollusk of the genus Aucellina, found in a rich fossil locality nearby.
