= Brillant =

Brillant may refer to:

== People ==
- Félix Brillant (born 1980)
- Dany Brillant (born 1965)
- Edmond Wilhelm Brillant (1916–2004)
- Jean Brillant (1890–1918)
- Pierre-Luc Brillant (born 1978)

== Places ==
- Montigné-le-Brillant, Mayenne, France
- Val-Brillant, Quebec

== Other ==
- Brilliant, the original French and German way of writing the French-based word
- French ship Brillant (1815)
- Les Brillant, a French language Canadian sitcom
- Voigtländer Brillant, a twin-lens reflex camera

== See also ==
- Brilliance (disambiguation)
