= USS Boyle =

Benson-class destroyer

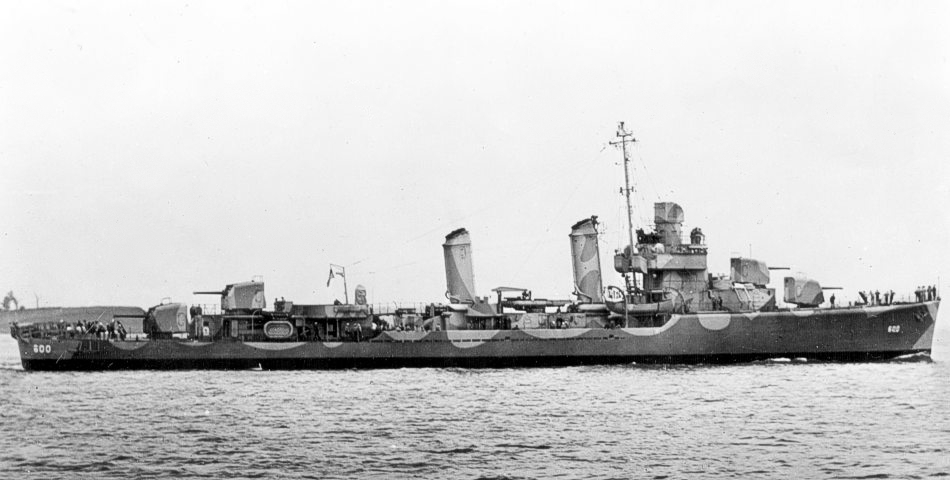
- USS Boyle (DD-600) at Boston in August 1942

History

United States
- Name: USS Boyle (DD-600)
- Namesake: Thomas Boyle
- Builder: Fore River Shipyard
- Launched: 15 June 1942
- Commissioned: 15 August 1942
- Decommissioned: 29 March 1946
- Stricken: 1 June 1971
- Fate: Sunk as target, 3 May 1973

General characteristics
- Class & type: Benson-class destroyer
- Displacement: 1,620 tons
- Length: 348 ft 2 in (106.12 m)
- Beam: 36 ft 1 in (11.00 m)
- Draft: 17 ft 6 in (5.33 m)
- Speed: 36.5 kts
- Complement: 276
- Armament: 5 x 5 in (130 mm)/38 guns, 10 x 21 inch (533 mm) tt.

USS Boyle (DD-600) was a Benson-class destroyer in the United States Navy during World War II. She was the first ship named after Thomas Boyle, a privateer and naval officer during the War of 1812.

Boyle was launched 15 June 1942 by Bethlehem Steel Corporation, Quincy, Massachusetts, sponsored by Mrs. Margaret A. Glascock, great-granddaughter of Sailing Master Boyle, and commissioned 15 August 1942.

== Service history ==
Boyle joined the Atlantic Fleet and sailed from Norfolk, Virginia 25 October 1942 as part of Task Force 34 (TF 34), bound for the invasion of North Africa. She took part in the landings at Fedhala, French Morocco (8–11 November), and the skirmish with French corvettes off Casablanca (10 November). Returning to the United States 30 November she patrolled off the east coast and in the Caribbean until February 1943.

Between then and 4 April 1944 Boyle made six convoy runs to North Africa and three to Ireland. On 7 February 1943, Boyle served as an escort for Convoy UGS-5 to North Africa. Two days out, Pan Royal was accidentally rammed by both Evita and George Davis. Pan Royal sank at position 36°40′N 67°20′W with the loss of eight men. Her 54 survivors were rescued by Boyle.

The monotony of convoy duty was broken by participation in the Sicilian invasion, where she served as a guide ship for the Scoglitti landings (9–15 July 1943). After serving with a hunter-killer group off New York in April 1944, she returned to the Mediterranean Sea. She patrolled in the Gulf of Naples, Italy, during May and June, taking part in the bombardment of Formia and Anzio (13–18 May). Between 15 August and 1 September, she took part in the Invasion of southern France. Boyle returned to New York 14 September.

Following a yard period at Boston, Massachusetts, she returned to the Mediterranean 21 December 1944 and remained there on fire support and escort duty until 22 April 1945. Returning to the east coast 1 May, she sailed for the Pacific Ocean 23 May, and arrived at San Diego, California, 12 June.

After cruising between San Diego and Pearl Harbor (25 June–17 July 1945) she steamed to the western Pacific, arriving at Saipan 5 August. En route, Boyle took part in the bombardment of Wake Island (1 August 1945). The destroyer reached Okinawa 12 August and patrolled there until 1 September when she departed for Tokyo, Japan. She arrived off Tokyo 11 September and served in Japanese, Okinawan, and Chinese waters until departing Okinawa 1 November. She arrived at Charleston, South Carolina, 8 December 1945, and remained there until being placed out of commission in reserve 29 March 1946. She was struck from the Naval Vessel Register on 1 June 1971. She was sunk as a target on 3 May 1973 off Florida.

== Awards ==
Boyle received four battle stars for her World War II service.
