= Marquis Cornwallis (1802 ship) =

History

United Kingdom
- Name: Marquis Cornwallis
- Namesake: Charles Cornwallis, 1st Marquess Cornwallis
- Builder: Sunderland
- Launched: 1802
- Fate: Wrecked December 1823

General characteristics
- Tons burthen: 111 (bm)
- Sail plan: Brig

Marquis Cornwallis was launched at Sunderland in 1802. She traded widely, to the West Indies, the Iberian peninsula, and the Baltic. The American privateer Chasseur captured her in 1814 but released her as a cartel to deliver a challenging message to the British government. She was wrecked in 1823.

== Career ==
Marquis Cornwallis first appeared in Lloyd's Register (LR) in 1802. In 1803 LR showed her master as G.Killer, changing to T.Letsne and then to T. Simpson. Her owner was "Captain & Co.", and her trade London–Tobago, changing to London–Copenhagen.

Year	Master	Owner	Trade	Source
1805	T.Simpson	Keiler & Co.	Lieth coaster	LR
1810	T.Simpson	Keiler & Co.	Lieth–Gothenburg; London–Lisbon	LR

On 17 January 1814, Marquis of Cornwallis, Simpson (late), master, put into Weymouth, in a leaky state. she had been sailing from London to Gibraltar.

Lloyd's List reported on 6 September on a number of prizes that had fallen prey to the American privateers Chasseur, David Porter, and Whig. Chasseur had captured Marquis Cornwallis, Simpson, master, on 8 August, but had given her up as a cartel. She had arrived off the Isles of Scilly on 30 August. Marquis Cornwallis had been sailing from Teneriffe to Portsmouth.

On 27 August 1814, Captain Thomas Boyle, of Chasseur, captured Marquis Cornwallis, and by her sent a message to King George. Boyle issued a proclamation of blockade, forbidding “ships and vessels of all and every nation in amity and peace with the United States from entering... any of [their] said ports.

Year	Master	Owner	Trade	Source & notes
1815	T.Simpson	Keiler & Co.	London–Viana	LR
1820	J.Napier	Butt & Co.	London–Petersburg	LR; Damages repaired 1819

In September 1818 Marquis Cornwall, Napier, master, was on her way from Dunkirk to Petersburg when she ran aground on the Swine Bottoms in the Baltic Sea, off Denmark. The "Diving company" assisted in getting her off and she arrived in the Sound on the 12th.

== Fate ==
Marquis Cornwallis, Herring, master, foundered on 3 December 1823 off the Dogger Bank, in the North Sea. She was on a voyage from Sunderland, County Durham, to London with a cargo of coals. A light collier from Shields saved her crew.
