= Benson (1794 ship) =

History

Great Britain
- Name: Benson
- Builder: Liverpool
- Launched: 1794
- Fate: Wrecked 23 March 1811

General characteristics
- Tons burthen: 361, or 375, or 376 (bm)
- Complement: 1794:20; 1796:20; 1799:40; 1803:40; 1807:45
- Armament: 1794:14 × 6-pounder guns; 1796:14 × 6-pounder guns; 1799:20 × 6-pounder guns & 18-pounder carronades; 1803:20 × 6-pounder guns & 18-pounder carronades; 1807:18 × 6&9-pounder guns & 18-pounder carronades

Benson was launched in 1794 in Liverpool as a West Indiaman. She sailed under a letter of marque and in December 1798 engaged in a notable single-ship action in which she repelled an attack by a French naval corvette of superior force. Benson was wrecked on 23 March 1811.

== Career ==
Benson first appeared in Lloyd's Register (LR) in 1794.

Year	Master	Owner	Trade	Source
1794	Atkinson	Benson & Co.	London–Jamaica	LR
1795	J.Atkinson; R.Crosdell	Benson & Co.	London–Jamaica	LR

Captain John Atkinson acquired a letter of marque on 12 February 1794. Captain Richard Croasdell acquired one on 17 December 1796.

In December 1797 as Benson, Crosdale, master, was sailing for Jamaica from Liverpool she grounded at Liverpool. It was expected that she would have to unload her cargo to effect repairs.

A year later, on 6 December 1798, Benson was some 18 leagues off st Kitts when she encountered a French naval corvette of twenty 9-pounder guns and 170 men. The two vessels engaged for an hour and a half, and then again for 45 minutes or so before the French vessel sailed off. The French had fired high to disable Benson's sails and rigging. In this they succeeded to the extent that Benson was in no condition to pursue; she also had no casualties. Benson, by contrast, had fired low to cause casualties. In this Benson succeeded, reportedly killing 14 men and wounding 20 aboard the French vessel, leading it to break off the engagement.

The next day Benson chased a privateer schooner, of 12 guns and a large complement, into the shoals of Cape Roxen, on the west end of Puerto Rico.

On 11 December Benson chased a French privateer cutter of 17 guns that had an American brig, her prize, in company. As Benson gained on the cutter the wind failed. The cutter liberated her prize and escaped by using her sweeps.

On an earlier voyage, Benson had captured a Spanish vessel valued at about £7000.

Year	Master	Owner	Trade	Source
1799	Crosdale; T.Phillips	Benson & Co.	London–Jamaica	LR
1805	T.Phillips; J.Askin	Benson & Co.	London–Jamaica	LR

Captain Thomas Phillips acquired a letter of marque on 2 September 1799. Captain John Askew acquired one on 9 September 1803. LR was only as accurate as ship owners' reporting.

Year	Master	Owner	Trade	Source & notes
1806	J.Aikin; J.Askew	Benson & Co.	London–Jamaica	LR
1807	J.Askew; J.Lea	Benson & Co.	London–Jamaica	LR; repairs 1805

Captain James Lea acquired a letter of marque on 12 November 1807.

Year	Master	Owner	Trade	Source
1809	J.Lea; R.Allen	Benson & Co. Holland & Co.	London–Jamaica; Brazil	LR; repairs 1805
1810	R.Allen; Willimot	Holland & Co. Bennet & Co.	Liverpool–Jamaica; London–Yucatán	Register of Shipping; small repairs 1803

== Fate ==
As Brilliant was returning to London from Honduras, on 3 February 1811 she encountered Benson, Wilmot, master, and Hope, Ward, master, off Cape Florida. The two vessels were 16 days out of Honduras and on their way had encountered bad gales that had made Benson leaky; she was making four feet of water per hour. Her masts also had received significant damage. Brilliant accompanied Benson until they were two-days' sail from Charleston, at which time Brilliant separated, confident that Benson could reach the port.

Benson, Wilmot, master, arrived at Charleston on 19 February, "in distress". However, she got on shore on 23 March and it was expected that she would be totally lost.
