= Thomas Kemp (shipbuilder) =

US shipbuilder (1779–1824)

- Born: February 28, 1779; St. Michael's, Maryland
- Died: March 2, 1824 (aged 45)
- Occupation: Shipbuilder
- Known for: Schooner Comet, clipper Chasseur
- Spouse(s): Sophia Horstman (1803–1809), Eliza (Fisher) Doyle (1809–1824)
- Children: from Horstman: Thomas H., Elizabeth, and Sophia; from Fisher: John W., Louisa, Margaret (died in infancy), Joseph F., Sally Ann, and William Pinkney
- Parents: Thomas Kemp (father); Rachel Denny (mother)

Thomas Kemp (28 February 1779 – 2 March 1824) was a Baltimore shipbuilder, known for building some of the fastest and best known privateers of the War of 1812, such as Rossie, Comet, Patapsco, Chasseur, and Lynx.

== Early Career as a Shipbuilder ==
Thomas Kemp moved to Baltimore in 1803 from near Saint Michaels, Maryland on the Eastern Shore of Maryland. He is thought to have learned at least some of his shipbuilding skills at the Dawson's wharf shipyard in St. Michaels. In 1804, he built a schooner with his brother Joseph. In the next few years his shipyard was mostly involved in making repairs to Baltimore vessels. He made some repairs for Isaac McKim on the schooner Maryland, the brig Samuel and the Chesapeake, for Henry Craig on the Vigilante and the schooner Eclipse and for John Conway on the schooner Nonsuch.

== Building Baltimore Clippers ==
On July 6, 1805, Kemp purchased additional property bounded by Fountain, Fleet, and Washington streets at Fell's Point, expanding his business and establishing his own shipyard.

It is important to noticed that some of the vessels built by Kemp were attributed to different shipbuilders, partially because Kemp did not put his name on those ships, as it was against Quaker principles.

== Ships Built by Thomas Kemp's Shipyard ==
- Thomas and Joseph (1804), a schooner Kemp built with his brother, Joseph
- Lynx (1806), 99 tons, a Baltimore clipper schooner for Henry Craig
- Maria (1806), a schooner for Henry Craig
- Eidue (1806), 190 tons, a brig for Captain Christopher Deshon
- Unnamed schooner (possibly Breezio) (1806), 114 1/3 tons, for Captain Christopher Deshon
- Hawk (or Mohawk) (1807), 124 tons, a schooner for Henry Craig
- Leo (1807), 244 1/4 tons, a brig for Henry Wilson.
- a pilot boat (1807) for William Harrow
- five ships (1807) for Isaac McKim, Henry Wilson, James Barry, John McKee, and Henry Craig
- Rossie (1808), a schooner and a privateer of the War of 1812.
- a schooner (1808), 146 1/2 tons, for John McFadon
- two gunboats (1808) for John Strieker for the United States
- Experiment (1808), 108 tons, a schooner for Captain Christopher Deshon
- two schooner brigs (1808) for Henry Wilson and John McKee
- Aut (1809), a schooner for Charles Kalkman
- a pilot boat schooner (possibly Wasp) (1809) for James Taylor and Curtis
- a schooner (possibly Hornet) (1809), 100 tons, for James Taylor and Curtis
- Comet (1810), a schooner and a privateer of the War of 1812, commanded by Captain Thomas Boyle.
- a schooner (1810), 189 91/95 tons, for Hollins & McBlair
- a schooner (possibly Leopard) (1810), 79 50/95 tons, for P. A. Gestier
- Milo (1810), 230 34/95 tons, a brig for James Williams
- Wabash (1810), 262 1/2 tons, for Samuel Smith & Buchanan
- a pilot boat (1810) for William Pitt
- Extreme (1811), 122 1/3 tons, length 65' 6", a schooner for Captain Robert Hambleton
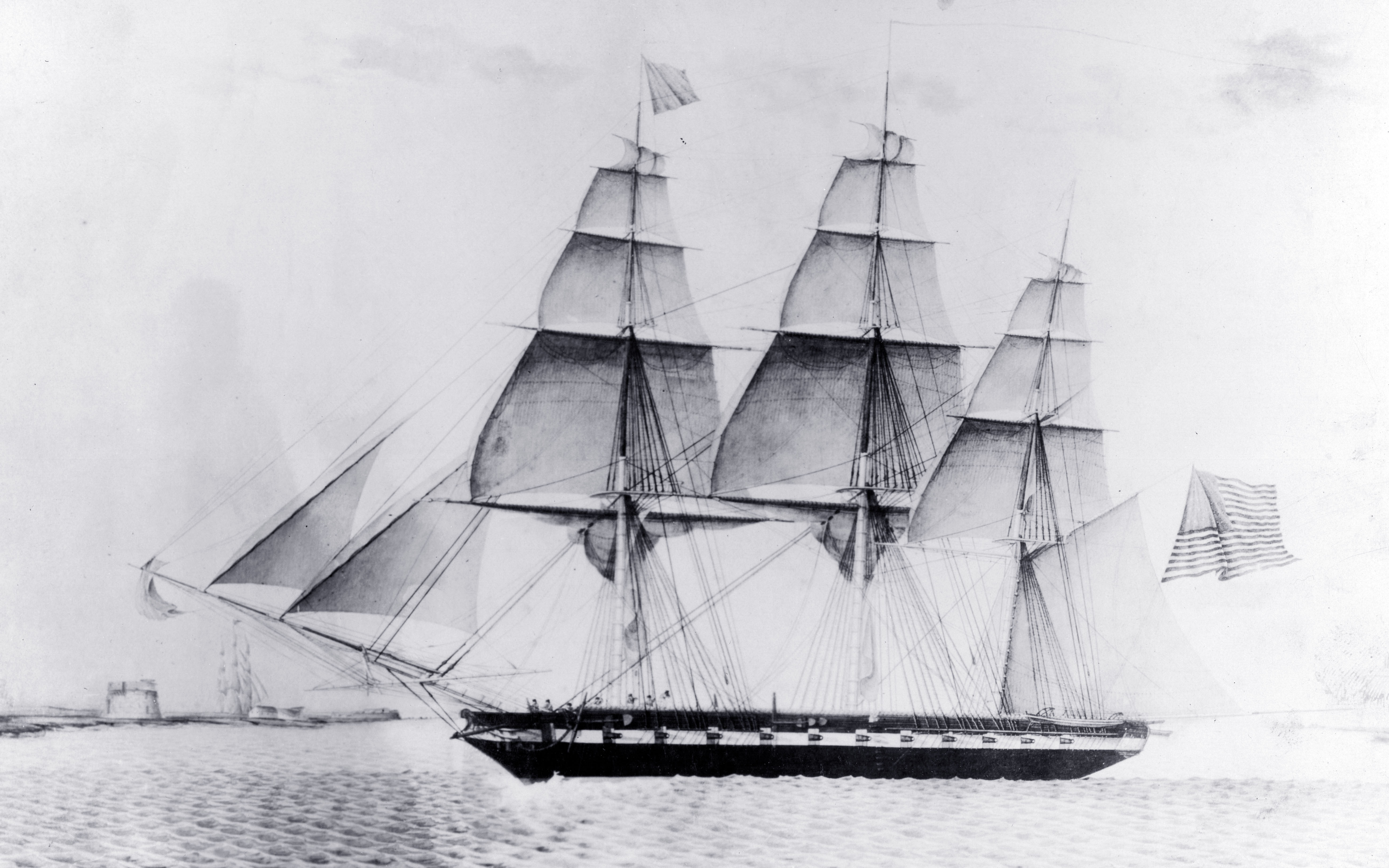
- USS Ontario
  Marmion (1811), 244 tons, for Smith & Buchanan
- a pilot boat (1811) for William Pitt
- a small boat (1811) for Joseph Butler
- Arrow (1811), 180 74/95 tons, a schooner for Hollins & McBlair
- Emperor of Russia (1810), 430 tons, for Charles F. Kalkman
- Patapsco (1810s), 259 tons, a ten-gun schooner commissioned as a privateer on 4 June 1814 under command of Richard Moon.
- Grecian (1812), 187 1/4 tons, for Isaac McKim
- Chasseur (1812), a topsail schooner and a privateer of the War of 1812, commanded by Captain Thomas Boyle.
- Lynx (1812), a six-gun schooner commissioned as a privateer under command of captain Elisha Taylor.
- USS Erie and Ontario (1813), sloops of war, for United States Navy
- three barges (1814) for United States Navy
- David Porter (1814), 18 1/2 tons, a sloop
- Perry (1814), possibly was built by Kemp
- a schooner (1814), 122 1/2 tons, for Fulford & Clopper
- a schooner (1814), 124 63/95 tons, for Pearl Durkee
- Seagull (1815), a sloop for Captain James Martin
- a schooner (1818) for George Williams
- a schooner (1819) for Henry Payson & Co.
- K&R (1822), a schooner built by Kemp and Joseph Robson

== After the War of 1812 ==
After the War of 1812 demand on shipbuilding declined and Kemp returned to the Eastern Shore to live at his farm, Wade's Point. He only built a few vessels after the war.
