= Brilliance =

Brilliance may refer to:

- Brilliance (gemstone), a measure of the light performance of gemstone diamonds
- Brilliance (graphics editor), a bitmap graphics editor for the Amiga
- Brilliance (synchrotron light), the quality of an x-ray source
- Brilliance (Atlantic Starr album), 1982
- Brilliance, an album by Chieko Kawabe, 2005
- The Brilliance, an American indie band
- Brilliance Audio, an ebook subsidiary of Amazon
- Brilliance Auto, a Chinese car company
- Brilliance, a novel by Marcus Sakey, 2013
- Genius

== See also ==
- Brightness
- Spectral radiance
- Brillant (disambiguation)
- Brilliant (disambiguation)
