= USS Erie (1813) =

Sloops-of-war of the United States Navy

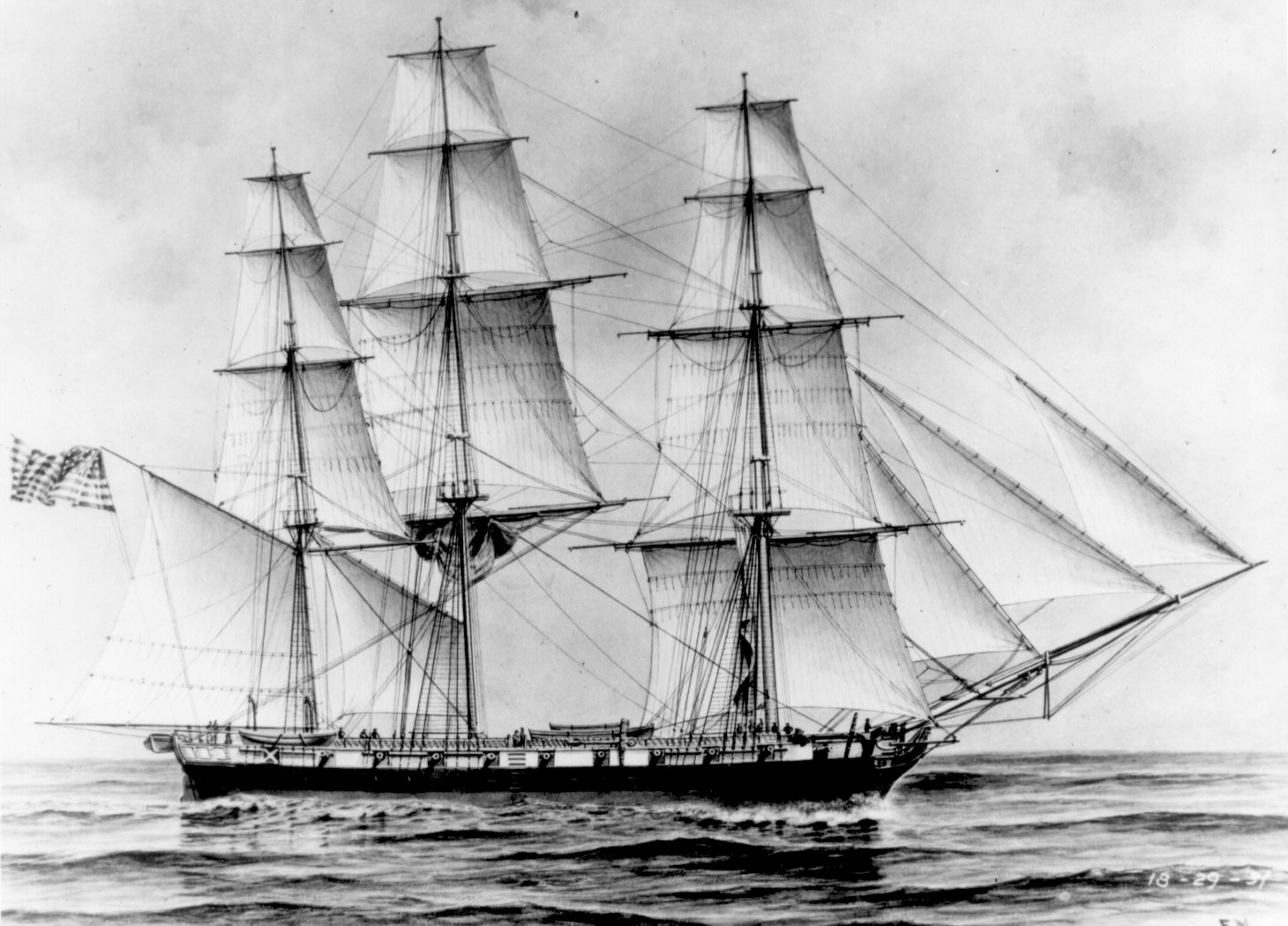
- USS Erie

History

United States
- Name: USS Erie
- Builder: Thomas Kemp, Baltimore, Maryland
- Cost: $25,461.05
- Launched: 3 November 1813
- Fate: Sold, 26 November 1850

General characteristics
- Tons burthen: 509 tons
- Length: 117 ft 11 in (35.94 m)
- Beam: 31 ft 6 in (9.60 m)
- Depth of hold: 14 ft 6 in (4.42 m)
- Complement: 140 officers and enlisted
- Armament: 2×18-pounder cannons; 20×32-pounder carronades

USS Erie was a three-masted, wooden-hulled sloop-of-war of the United States Navy in the early 19th century.

== Launch ==
Erie was launched 3 November 1813 by Thomas Kemp, Baltimore, Maryland; and first put to sea 20 March 1814, Commander Charles G. Ridgeley in command.

== Service in the Mediterranean ==
Unable to reach the open sea because of the British blockade at Hampton Roads, Erie was forced to return to Baltimore 7 April 1814 where she remained berthed at Baltimore without a crew until early in 1815. On 8 May she sailed to Boston, Massachusetts to join Commodore William Bainbridge's squadron sailing for the Mediterranean 2 July. With peace concluded with Algiers before the squadron reached the area, the squadron returned to the United States, leaving Erie to cruise with the naval force assigned to protect commerce and guard against any further disturbance of peace by the Barbary States. She remained on station for 4 years, sailing from Gibraltar for home 27 November 1819. After calling at Madeira and in the West Indies, she reached New York 20 January 1820, and was laid up there for repairs for 3½ years.

Lengthened to 122 feet (37 m) and with her tonnage increased to 611 tons, Erie sailed from New York in November 1823 to serve in the Mediterranean until 1826. From 1827 to 1832, she was based at Pensacola, Florida, returning north to New York or Norfolk, Virginia for necessary repairs. Erie patrolled in the West Indies and off the coast of Mexico, protecting American citizens and property, suppressing the slave trade, and convoying merchantmen.

== Service in South America ==
After lying in ordinary at Boston from 21 August 1832 to 24 June 1834, Erie served on the Brazil Station for 3 years, as flagship during the last two. During a period of revolution and other political disturbance, her squadron gave protection to Americans and their commerce, and provided vital intelligence concerning Brazil, Uruguay, and Argentina. She was again in ordinary at Boston from 15 September 1837 to 4 February 1838, and on 9 February sailed to cruise the Atlantic coast, to aid any merchantmen she might find in distress. In July, she sailed to Pensacola to patrol the West Indies and Gulf of Mexico for 2 weeks, guarding American interests during the French blockade of Mexican ports.

== Service in the Pacific ==
Between July 1840 and February 1843, Erie was rebuilt at Boston, and converted into an armed storeship. She sailed for the Pacific 9 February, delivered supplies to ships on the Brazil Station en route, and reached Callao, Peru, 27 July. During a cruise to the Hawaiian and Society Islands between November 1843 and January 1844, she served as flagship and in June 1844, she sailed for New York, arriving 10 November.

Erie crossed the Atlantic to supply the African Squadron, then repaired at New York, returning to the Pacific Squadron 18 November 1845. When the Mexican–American War opened, Erie was in the Hawaiian Islands, but she returned to the coasts of Mexico, California, and Panama in August 1846, to supply the fleet in its operations at sea and in landings. She participated in the occupation of Mazatlán 11 November 1847, and shortly thereafter sailed for the east coast, reaching New York 24 June 1848.

== Last Voyages ==
Erie set sail for the coast of Africa and the Mediterranean 15 September 1848 to deliver supplies to ships on those stations. She returned to New York 11 July 1849 and between 6 September 1849 and 12 September 1850, twice more voyaged to the Mediterranean with supplies. She was sold in New York 26 November 1850.

== Bibliography ==
- Paullin, Charles Oscar (1910). Commodore John Rodgers: Captain ... The Arthur H. Clark Company, Cleveland, Ohio. p. 434. Url
- Cooper, James Fenimore (1826). History of the Navy of the United States of America.
  Stringer & Townsend, New York. p. 508. OCLC 197401914. Url
- Maclay, Edgar Stanton (1894). A History of the United States Navy, from 1775 to 1893.
  D. Appleton & Company, New York. pp. 647. Url
- Dept U.S.Navy. "Erie". Dictionary of American Naval Fighting Ships.
  DEPARTMENT OF THE NAVY -- NAVAL HISTORICAL CENTER. Archived from the original on 15 March 2004.
