= Brilliant (1813 ship) =

History

United Kingdom
- Name: Brilliant
- Owner: John Barry & Co. (1814)
- Builder: John Barry, Whitby
- Launched: 2 December 1813
- Fate: Foundered 7 February 1823

General characteristics
- Tons burthen: 23414/94 or 237 (bm)
- Armament: 4 guns (1814)

Brilliant was launched at Whitby in 1813. She spent the bulk of her career sailing between London and the Cape of Good Hope (CGH). Finally, she became waterlogged while sailing between New Brunswick and Dublin and on 7 February 1823, her crew and passengers had to abandon her.

== Career ==
Brilliant's first captain was A. Smales. The Register of Shipping (RS) for 1815 showed her master as A.Smales, her owner as J.Barry, and her trade as Whitby–Shields. She was sold to London owners in 1814.

She first appeared in Lloyd's Register (LR) in 1814.

Year	Master	Owner	Trade	Source
1814	G.Brown; Young	Berry	London–Cadiz; London–CGH	LR
1816	W.Young	Berry	London–CGH	LR
1818	W.Young	Berry	London–CGH	LR
1821	W.Young; J.Smith	Berry; Hill & Co.	London–CGH	LR
1823	Scott	Capt.& Co.	Dublin–Quebec	LR

== Fate ==
Her passengers and crew abandoned Brilliant, Scott, master, on 7 February 1823 at 38°N 47°W as she was sailing from St. Andrews, New Brunswick to Dublin. Young Phoenix rescued the two passengers and the crew, who had taken to the tops of her masts as Brilliant became waterlogged. (Note: Young Phenix (or Young Phoenix), of 363 tons (bm), was launched in 1822 at Rochester-Mattapoisett, Massachusetts. At the time of the rescue she was trading between Liverpool and New York. In 1826 she became a whaling ship that continued whale hunting until gale-driven ice crushed her against the shore on 3 August 1888 at Point Barrow.)
