= HMS St Lawrence (1813) =

British warship

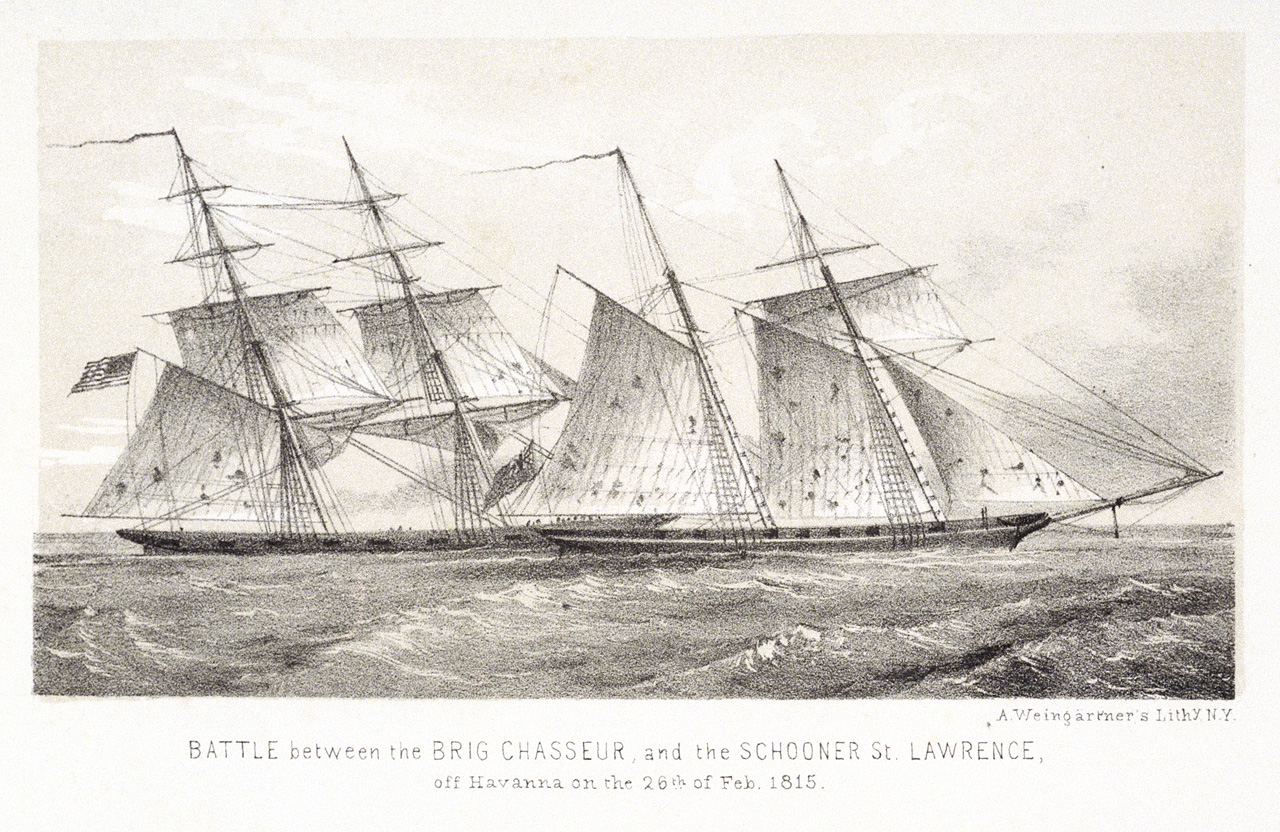
- Chasseur capturing HMS St Lawrence, by Adam Weingartner

History

United Kingdom
- Name: HMS St Lawrence
- Acquired: 13 June 1813
- Captured: 26 February 1815

General characteristics
- Class & type: 14-gun schooner
- Tons burthen: 244 bm
- Complement: 60 in British service
- Armament: American service: 12 × short 9-pounder guns + 1 × long 9-pounder gun; British service: 12 × 12-pounder carronades + 2 × 9-pounder guns

HMS St Lawrence was a 14-gun schooner of the Royal Navy. She had been built in 1808 in St. Michaels, Talbot County, Maryland for Thomas Tennant and sold to Philadelphians in 1810. During the War of 1812 she was the US privateer Atlas. The UK captured her in 1813 and renamed her St Lawrence. The US privateer Chasseur recaptured her in 1815, and then HMS Acasta re-recaptured her.

== Privateer ==
Atlas had a home port of Philadelphia and took to sea early in the war under the command of Captain David Maffitt. She was armed with 12 short 9-pounders and one long 9-pounder, and had a crew of 104 men. In July 1812, she cleared the Capes of the Delaware, and when two days out she took the brig Tulip, Captain Monk, just out from New York. On 3 August Atlas captured Pursuit, of 450 tons, carrying 16 guns and a crew of 35 men, and Planter, of 280 tons, carrying twelve 12-pounders and a crew of 15 men. Both ships were thirty days out from Surinam, bound for London, with a cargo of coffee, cotton, cocoa, and six hundred hogsheads of sugar. Atlas, which had sailed between the two vessels and fired broadsides from both sides, had been damaged in the fighting before the two vessels struck. Still, Atlas made it safely back to Philadelphia with Pursuit. The British recaptured Planter, off the Delaware Capes.

=== Capture ===
On a cruise early in the summer of 1813, Atlas took shelter in Ocracoke Inlet, North Carolina, where she found the 18-gun privateer Anaconda, out of New York City, Captain Nathaniel Shaler commanding. Here, on 12 July, a British squadron under Rear Admiral Sir George Cockburn, that included HMS Highflyer, herself a former American privateer, captured the two vessels. The British took both vessels into service, Anaconda as HMS Anaconda, and Atlas as HMS St Lawrence.

== British service ==
Her first British commander was Lieutenant David Boyd, (Note: He had transferred from HMS Firefly.) and he served on her until 1 October 1814, when he became acting commander of the sloop Alban, which was the former American privateer William Bayard.

In June 1814 St Lawrence, was part of a squadron under Captain Robert Barrie of the 74-gun third rate Dragon. The British chased Joshua Barney's Chesapeake Bay Flotilla of 18 gunboats, barges and the like up the Patuxent River. On 26 June, the Americans scuttled 16 of the remaining vessels of the flotilla, with the British capturing one.

St Lawrence shared with a number of other British warships in the capture, on 2 July 1814, of the schooner Little Tom. Then 12 days later, St Lawrence shared in the capture of the schooners William, Eliza, Union, and Emmeline. (Note: For the cargo of the Little Tom an ordinary seaman on St Lawrence received 11½d, or less than a shilling; for the four schooners the seaman received 2s 7d.)

In January 1815 Lieutenant James E. Gordon took command. On 26 February 1815, St Lawrence was bound for Mobile with dispatches when just off Havana, she encountered the privateer brig Chasseur, out of Baltimore and under the command of Captain Thomas Boyle.

Chasseur carried 14 guns and 102 men, while St Lawrence carried 14 guns and 76 men, though St Lawrence's broadside was much heavier. What would prove decisive though was small arms fire from the American vessel. The intense action lasted only about 15 minutes, during which St Lawrence suffered six men killed and 18 wounded, several of them mortally. (According to American accounts, the English had 15 killed and 25 wounded.) Chasseur had five killed and eight wounded, including Boyle. Both vessels were badly damaged. Captain Boyle made a cartel of St Lawrence and sent her and her crew into Havana as his prize.

== Fate ==
Acasta recaptured St Lawrence in March. The British sailed St Lawrence to Bermuda where an Admiralty Court ruled that as the capture took place after the treaty of peace, in accordance with the terms of peace she was to be returned to the United States as a legitimate prize of war.
