= Pursuit (1795 ship) =

British merchant ship 1795–1812

History

Great Britain
- Name: Pursuit
- Owner: 1795:Atty & Co.; 1799:Dawson; 1807:Liney & Co.
- Builder: Ing. Eskdale, Whitby
- Launched: 17 August 1795
- Fate: Captured August 1812

General characteristics
- Tons burthen: 393, 40661/94, or 406, or 408 or 450 (bm)
- Length: 107 ft 9 1/4 in (32.8 m) (overall); 86 ft 1 3/4 in (26.3 m) (keel)
- Beam: 29 ft 3 3/4 in (8.9 m)
- Depth of hold: 12 ft 8 3/4 in (3.9 m)
- Propulsion: Sail
- Complement: 1797:33; 1801:40; 1813:35
- Armament: 1797: 12 × 6&12-pounder guns + 6 swivel guns; 1801:12 × 6-pounder guns + 8 × 18-pounder carronades + 2 swivels; 1813:8 × 18-pounder carronades + 8 × 9-pounder guns "of the New Construction"
- Notes: Two decks

Pursuit was launched at Whitby in 1795. She made two voyages for the British East India Company and then traded with the West Indies. She repelled one attack by a French privateer that caused severe casualties, but eventually an American privateer captured her in August 1812.

== Career ==
Pursuit enters Lloyd's Register in 1795 with J. Barker, master, Atty, owner, and trade London-East India.

EIC voyage #1 (1795-1796): Before Pursuit sailed on her first voyage as an "extra ship" under charter to the EIC, the EIC had Fletcher measure and repair her. Captain John Barker sailed from the Downs on 22 September 1795, bound for Bengal. Pursuit reached Calcutta on 7 February 1796. Homeward bound, she was at Fultah (possibly the present day Falta), on 27 March, and reached St Helena on 21 July and Crookhaven on 26 November. She arrived back at the Downs on 11 December.

EIC voyage #2 (1797-1798): Captain John Barker acquired a letter of marque on 20 March 1797. He sailed from London on 28 March 1797, and from Portsmouth on 3 June, again bound for Bengal. Pursuit reached Calcutta on 27 October. Homeward bound, she was at Culpee (an anchorage towards Calcutta, and just below Diamond Harbour), on 30 November, and reached St Helena on 2 March 1798 and Cork on 25 June. She returned to the Downs on 8 July.

On her return, Pursuit began trading to the West Indies.

Year	Master	Owner	Trade
1798	J. Barker; S.Borrows	Atty& Co.	London—India; London—Jamaica
1799	S. Burrows; J. Stranock	Atty & Co. I & J. Dawson	London—Jamaica

In 1799 new owners changed Pursuit's registration from Whitby to London.

Lloyd's List reported on 28 January 1800 that La Fraternite, which had been sailing from Liverpool to Africa, had returned to Liverpool dismasted. Before she returned she had encountered Pursuit. While Pursuit had been sailing from London to Jamaica, she had repelled an attack by a French privateer, but at the cost of the death of all her officers, except her master, who had been severely wounded. La Fraternite had put a mate on board Pursuit to help her return to port.

Year	Master	Owner	Trade
1800	J. Stunock	Dawson	London—Jamaica
1801	J. Sterry; J. Sturrock; Borradale	Dawson	London—Jamaica; London—Surinam

On 29 January 1801 James Sturrock acquired a letter of marque. However, when Borradale replaced him as master Borradale did not also acquire one.

A year later, on 27 January 1802 Pursuit, Borradale, master, grounded at Surinam. Part of her cargo had been landed and she was expected to be gotten off.

Year	Master	Owner	Trade
1802	Boradaile; I. Roberts	Dawson	London—Surinam
1806	McDonald; King	Dawson	London—Jamaica

One report has Pursuit parting from her convoy on 23 August 1806 on passage from Jamaica for London in the 1806 Great Coastal hurricane and not being heard of again. However, Pursuit was not lost; she continued to trade.

Year	Master	Owner	Trade
1807	King	Lyney	London—Jamaica
1808	King	Lyney	London—Jamaica
1809	King or G. Frouell	Liney & Co	London—Jamaica
1810	W. Chivers	Liney & Co.	London—Surinam
1811	W. Chivers	Liney & Co.	London—Surinam
1812	W. Chivers	Liney & Co.	London—Surinam; New "B_da"
1813	W. Chivers	Liney & Co.	London—Surinam

The entry in the 1813 volume of Lloyd's Register carries the notation "captured".

== Fate ==
Lloyd's List reported that Commodore John Rodgers's squadron captured Pursuit as Pursuit was sailing from Surinam to London. The Americans sent Pursuit and another prize to America. The capture took place not long after the outbreak of war between England and the United States.

The other vessel that Lloyd's List mentions as being captured was Argo, Middleton, master, sailing from Pernambuco. Rodgers and President captured Argo on 2 August 1812. The list of captures does not include Pursuit, which actually fell prey to an American privateer. (Note: The British reportedly recaptured Argo.)

On 3 August the Philadelphia-based privateer schooner Atlas encountered Pursuit and Planter at 36°N 47°W. At 11a.m. there began an engagement of an hour-and-a-half duration. Eventually both British vessels struck. The British had suffered two men dead and three wounded. The Americans had suffered two men dead and five wounded.

The details below are from Coggeshall, Maclay, and Williams.

Vessel	Master	Tons (bm)	Guns	Men
Atlas	Moffat		10	100
Pursuit	Chivers	450	10	35
Planter	Frith or Fritte	280	12	15

Atlas made it safely back to Philadelphia with Pursuit. The British recaptured Planter off the Delaware Capes. (Note: The frigate Shannon reportedly was the captor.) Later, the British Royal Navy captured Atlas and took her into service as HMS St Lawrence.
