= Cape Rosa =

Cape Rosa (54°11′S 37°25′W) is a cape marking the south side of the entrance to King Haakon Bay on the south coast of South Georgia. The name first appears about 1920 on charts of South Georgia and has since become established by usage.

It was here, in a cave, that Ernest Shackleton's expedition sheltered for four days, and this is commemorated in a plaque there.

The small headland of Aucellina Point is nearby, about 1.6 miles (2.6 km) southeast.
