= HMS Brilliant =

Nine ships of the Royal Navy have been named HMS Brilliant.

- HMS Brilliant (1696) was a prize sloop taken in 1696 and sold in 1698.
- HMS Brilliant (1729) was a sloop in service in 1729.
- HMS Brilliant (1757) was a 36-gun fifth rate launched in 1757 and sold in 1776.
- HMS Brilliant (1779) was a 28-gun sixth rate launched in 1779 and broken up in 1811.
- HMS Brilliant was the former name of HMS Orontes, renamed in 1813 and broken up in 1817.
- HMS Brilliant (1814) was a 36-gun fifth rate launched in 1814, renamed Briton in 1889 and sold in 1908.
- HMS Brilliant (1891) was an Apollo-class light cruiser launched in 1891 and sunk in 1918 as a blockship at Ostend.
- HMS Brilliant (H84) was a B-class destroyer launched in 1930. She served in World War II and was sold in 1947. She was scrapped in April 1948.
- HMS Brilliant (F90) was a Type 22 frigate launched in 1978. She took part in the Falklands War. She was sold to the Brazilian Navy in 1996 and renamed Dodsworth. She was scrapped in July 2012.

== Battle honours ==
- Belgian Coast 1914
- Zeebrugge 1918
- English Channel 1940–43
- Atlantic 1941–43
- North Africa 1942–43
- Falklands War 1982
- Kuwait 1991

== See also ==
- Brilliant (disambiguation)
