= Carlebury (1799 ship) =

History

Great Britain
- Name: Carlebury
- Namesake: Carlbury
- Owner: Chisman & Co.
- Builder: James Minns, Plymouth, or Yarmouth
- Launched: 17 October 1799
- Captured: 1814 and recaptured by Royal Navy
- Fate: Foundered 1821

General characteristics
- Tons burthen: 241, or 252 (bm)
- Armament: 1805: 4 × 6-pounder + 9 × 4-pounder guns

Carlebury (or Carlbury) was launched in 1799 and spent her entire career as a West Indiaman. An American privateer captured her in 1814, but the British Royal Navy recaptured her. She foundered in 1821 with the loss of most of her crew.

== Career ==
Carlebury first appeared in Lloyd's Register in 1800 with W. Johnson, master, Cox & Co., owners, changing to Chisman & Co., and trade Yarmouth.

| Year | Master | Owner | Trade | Notes and source |
|---|---|---|---|---|
| 1805 | R. Dolling | Chisman | London–Jamaica | Lloyd's Register (LR) |
| 1810 | J. Dower | Driscoll | London–Martinique | Damage and thorough repair 1809; LR |
| 1815 | Driscoll; G.Anthony | Driscoll | Cork–St Croix | LR |

Capture: Carlebury, Jameson, master, was sailing from Curacao when the American privateer Chasseur captured her on 20 September 1814. HMS Castilian recaptured Carlbury on 29 September 1814. (Note: A first-class share of the salvage money was worth £171 9s; a sixth-class share, that of an ordinary seaman, was worth £6 18s 4½d.) Lloyd's List reported on 11 October that Carlbury had arrived at Cork after Castilian had recaptured her. Chasseur had plundered Carlbury of her cargo. Carlebury had been carrying cotton, cocoa, hides, 237 seroons (packages) of indigo, etc., and her captors valued the cargo at 50,000 dollars.

A report from Santo Domingo dated 2 January 1818 stated that Captain Tingle had died there a few weeks earlier and that many members of Carlebury's crew had deserted. She had loaded on the coast and was going to proceed to Jamaica to gather a crew to take her back to England. The next report was that Carlbury, which had been sailing from Jamaica to Liverpool, had had to put into Charleston, South Carolina, on 24 April in distress. Part of her cargo was 40,000 feet of "prime St Domingo Mahogany".

| Year | Master | Owner | Trade | Notes and source |
|---|---|---|---|---|
| 1820 | J. Ronald | Captain | Bristol–London | Damages repaired 1808 and thorough repair 1815; LR |
| 1821 | J. Ronald | Captain | Bristol–London | Damages repaired 1808 and thorough repair 1815; LR |

== Fate ==
Her crew abandoned Carlebury at 51°13′N 26°06′W on 20 February 1821 as she was dismasted and waterlogged. Ellen, Campbell, master, rescued the only two survivors and brought them into Liverpool. Carlebury, Chambers (late), master, had been sailing from Saint John, New Brunswick, to Falmouth.
