= Thomas Boyle =

- Born: June 29, 1775; Marblehead, Massachusetts
- Died: October 12, 1825 (aged 50); At sea
- Spouse: Mary Gross (1779-1863)
- Children: Elizabeth Boyle (1797-1880)
- Military career
- Allegiance: United States
- Branch: United States Navy
- Service years: 16 April–September 1813
- Rank: Sailing Master
- Conflicts: War of 1812
- Other work: Privateer

Coat of Arms of Thomas Boyle

Thomas Boyle (29 June 1775 – 12 October 1825), an Irish American, as a captain of the schooner Comet and the clipper Chasseur, was one of the most successful Baltimore privateers during the War of 1812. He briefly served in the United States Navy during the same war.

== Biography ==
Born in Marblehead, Massachusetts, Boyle went to sea at 10 or 11 years of age. In 1794, he moved his base of operation to Baltimore, Maryland.

=== Early career ===
At age 17 he commanded several vessels for Baltimore French born merchant John Carrere, including Vigilant. In 1792, he commanded the schooner Hester, owned by Carrere. In April, 1808, he was appointed captain and commander of Baltimore's 51st. Regiment, but later resigned in order to take command of Comet.

=== War of 1812 ===
==== Comet ====
Soon after the War of 1812 began, Boyle took command of the privateer Comet and during his first cruise—conducted in the West Indies between 11 July and 7 October 1812—captured four vessels with an aggregate value of $400,000. On his second cruise, he sailed along the Brazilian coast, departing Baltimore on 25 November 1812. Though he made five captures, his second voyage was a financial disaster because British cruisers retook all five prizes. On 17 March 1813, Boyle slipped past the British blockade into Chesapeake Bay.

During the spring of 1813 the Royal Navy tightened its blockade of the Chesapeake which blocked attempts by Baltimore privateers to slip past them. Comet and two other privateers were contracted by the U.S. Navy to patrol and observe British movements, and Boyle accepted a warrant as sailing master in the United States Navy on 16 April 1813. His brief naval career lasted only until 8 September 1813 when he began to prepare Comet for her third voyage as a privateer.

On 29 October 1813, he and his ship slipped through the blockade in heavy weather. During that cruise to the West Indies, Boyle and his crew captured 20 prizes before returning to the United States at Beaufort, North Carolina, on 19 March 1814.

==== Chasseur and Blockade Proclamation ====
Boyle left Comet at Beaufort and headed north to Baltimore and thence to New York City where he took command of the privateer Chasseur, of which he was part owner. The privateer tried to put to sea on 24 July, but British warships obliged her to wait four days off Staten Island.

Once at sea, Boyle set a course for the British Isles via the Grand Banks. The cruise lasted three months, and he netted 18 prizes before returning to New York on 24 October. During his trip, Boyle proclaim a paper blockade of the British Isles. His proclamation was posted in Lloyd's Coffee House in London:

PROCLAMATION:

Whereas, It has become customary with the admirals of Great Britain, commanding small forces on the coast of the United States, particularly with Sir John Borlaise [sic] Warren and Sir Alexander Cochrane, to declare all the coast of the said United States in a state of strict and rigorous blockade without possessing the power to justify such a declaration or stationing an adequate force to maintain said blockade;

I do therefore, by virtue of the power and authority in me vested (possessing sufficient force), declare all the ports, harbors, bays, creeks, rivers, inlets, outlets, islands, and seacoast of the United Kingdom of Great Britain and Ireland in a state of strict and rigorous blockade.

And I do further declare that I consider the force under my command adequate to maintain strictly, rigorously, and effectually the said blockade.

And I do hereby require the respective officers, whether captains, commanders, or commanding officers, under my command, employed or to be employed, on the coasts of England, Ireland, and Scotland, to pay strict attention to the execution of this my proclamation.

And I do hereby caution and forbid the ships and vessels of all and every nation in amity and peace with the United States from entering or attempting to enter, or from coming or attempting to come out of, any of the said ports, harbors, bays, creeks, rivers, inlets, outlets, islands, or seacoast under any pretense whatsoever. And that no person may plead ignorance of this, my proclamation, I have ordered the same to be made public in England.

Given under my hand on board the Chasseur.

THOMAS BOYLE

By command of the commanding officer.

J. J. STANBURY, Secretary.

British merchants were alarmed, shipping and insurance rates soared and the Royal Navy diverted 14 sloops of war and three frigates to patrol the northern and western coasts of England. Upon her return to Baltimore Chasseur was hailed as "The Pride of Baltimore."

Boyle spent the next two months preparing for his fifth and final privateering voyage. On 24 December, Chasseur put to sea and shaped a course for the West Indies. There, she took a succession of prizes. On 25 February 1815, she chased what appeared to be a weakly armed coaster but which turned out to be a Royal Navy cruiser. Undaunted, Boyle raced to the attack and, after a sharp 15-minute fight, captured HMS St Lawrence. He was wounded during the capture and concluded his final cruise at Baltimore on 18 March 1815.

It was estimated that Boyle profited in a range of $30,000 as a privateer during the War of 1812.

As a commander of Chassuer Capt Boyle placed a significant emphasis on drills. His crew practiced over and over again handling the sails and operating the guns, which paid off during numerous engagements with the enemy vessels.

=== Late career ===
After the war Boyle returned to mercantile service between Baltimore and ports in the West Indies and South America. Boyle also was one of a number of 1812 captains who engaged in privateering under letters of marque during the Spanish American Wars of Independence.

Boyle died at sea aboard the 'second' Chasseur en route from Alvarado, Mexico to Philadelphia.

== Namesake and honors ==
"Boyle Street" in South Baltimore (intersects Fort Avenue and Key Highway) is named in honor of Thomas Boyle.

The destroyer USS Boyle (DD-600) was named for him. She was launched in 1942 and sponsored by Mrs. Margaret A. Glascock, great-granddaughter of Thomas Boyle.
