= USS Brilliant =

USS Brilliant may refer to the following ships operated by the United States Navy:

- USS Brilliant (1862), a steamer in commission from 1862 to 1865
- USS Brilliant (ID-1329), was the commercial tug Brilliant, registered for U.S. Navy service during World War I but never commissioned
