= Brilliant (1814 ship) =

British merchantman 1814–1849

History

United Kingdom
- Name: Brilliant
- Builder: A[lexander] Hall & Co., Aberdeen
- Launched: 20 July 1814
- Fate: Last listed in 1849

General characteristics
- Tons burthen: 330, or 332 (bm)
- Length: 97 ft 3 in (29.6 m), or 97 ft 2 in (29.6 m)
- Beam: 28 ft 8 in (8.7 m), or 29 ft 0 in (8.8 m)

Brilliant was launched at Aberdeen in 1814. She initially traded with the Caribbean and South America. She made one voyage in 1820 carrying settlers to South Africa. She later traded across the North Atlantic, carrying emigrants from Scotland to Quebec and bringing back lumber. She was last listed in 1849.

== Career ==
One report states that Brilliant was a whaler, but there is no evidence of that. She may have been built for the northern whale fishery (Greenland and Davis Strait), and strengthened against ice. However, there is no evidence that Brilliant ever engaged in whaling. Her construction cost was £15 s per ton.

Brilliant first appeared in Lloyd's Register in 1814 with Garrioch as master and owner, and trade London–Hayti.

Year	Master	Owner	Trade	Source & notes
1815	Garrioch	Garrioch	London–Hayti	Lloyd's Register (LR)
1820	Bothwell	J.Robinson	Cork	LR

Lloyd's Register for 1821 showed Brilliant with Bothwell, master, J.Robinson, owner, and trade Cork, changing to Plymouth transport. Captain William Bothwell sailed from England on 15 February 1820 bound for South Africa. He was bringing 144 settlers who were coming out under the 1820 Government Settler Scheme and Brilliant was one of some 20 vessels to bring out settlers that year. She made landfall on 30 April at Simon's Bay, and made final landfall on 15 May at Algoa Bay, Port Elizabeth.

Year	Master	Owner	Trade	Source & notes
1825	Beverley	Lumsden	Liverpool–Quebec	LR
1830	A.Barclay	A.Mackie	Leith–Quebec	LR; in 1828 she struck on Blackwater Bank (Wexford) but got off.

William Duthie purchased Brilliant in 1830. His timing was fortunate in that a depression was affecting Scotland while the south western region of Upper Canada was opening to immigrants. From 1830 to 1845 Brilliant carried more than 1300 immigrants to Canada, being usually the first vessel to arrive after winter. The number of passengers ranged between 20 (1830), and 175 (1832). She would then take on a cargo of lumber to carry back to Scotland.

Year	Master	Owner	Trade	Source & notes
1835	A.Duthie	W.Duthie	Aberdeen–Quebec	LR; large repair 1833
1840	A.Duthie; J.Elliot	W.Duthie	Aberdeen–Quebec	LR; large repair 1833
1845	J.Elliot	W.Duthie	Aberdeen–Quebec	LR; large repair 1833 & small repair 1843
1849		W.Duthie	Shields	LR; large repair 1833 & small repair 1843

== Fate ==
Brilliant was last listed in 1849. In 1850 the Duthie brothers launched a new Brilliant, of 548 tons (bm; New Act (post 1836)).
