= Brilliant (1807 ship) =

History

United Kingdom
- Name: Brilliant
- Builder: Whitehaven
- Launched: 1807
- Fate: Grounded February or 10 March 1821; refloated and sold

General characteristics
- Tons burthen: 367 (bm)
- Armament: 1813:16 guns; 1815: 6 × 6-pounder guns

Brilliant was launched at Whitehaven in 1807. Initially, she was a West Indiaman. Then from 1816 she started sailing to India under a license from the British East India Company (EIC). She grounded in February or on 10 March 1821 at Coringa (or Nursapura) while sailing from London to Bengal. She was refloated, repaired, and sold locally.

== Career ==
Brilliant first appeared in Lloyd's Register (LR) in 1807.

Year	Master	Owner	Trade	Source
1807	Morrison	Hyde & Co.	Greenock–Honduras	LR
1810	D.Morrison; W.Kerr; M'Arthur	Hyde & Co.	Greenock–Jamaica	LR

As Brilliant was returning to London from Honduras, on 3 February 1811 she encountered Benson, Wilmot, master, and Hope, Ward, master, off Cape Florida. The two vessels were 16 days out of Honduras and on their way had encountered bad gales that had made Benson leaky; she was making four feet of water per hour. Her masts also had received significant damage. Brilliant accompanied Benson until they were two-days sail from Charleston, at which time Brilliant left, confident that Benson could reach the port. (Note: Benson, Wilmot, master, arrived at Charleston on 19 February, "in distress". However, she got on shore on 23 March and it was expected that she would be totally lost.)

Year	Master	Owner	Trade	Source
1813	Thompson; B.Fenn	Fleming	London–Trinidad	LR
1818	B.Fenn	Campbell	London–Cape of Good Hope(CGH)	LR

In 1813 the EIC had lost its monopoly on the trade between India and Britain. British ships were then free to sail to India or the Indian Ocean under a license from the EIC.

On 19 October 1816, Brilliant, Fenn, master, sailed from Gravesend, bound for Bengal She reached the Cape of Good Hope (the Cape) on 30 December. On 4 February 1817 she was at Madras, and on 26 March she arrived at Bengal. On 21 January 1818 she was back at Gravesend.

On 23 July 1818 Brilliant, Fenn, master, sailed from Deal, for Bengal. By 11 August she was at Madeira. On 29 October she sailed from the Cape for Bengal. She arrived at Bengal on 12 January 1819. She arrived at the Cape from Bengal on 20 June 1819 and sailed for London on 3 July. She returned to Deal on 26 September from Bengal and the Cape.

On 26 September Brilliant, Fenn, master, sailed from Gravesend, bound for Bengal. She arrived at the Cape on 9 December and Madras on 15 February.

== Fate ==
Brilliant, Fenn, master, stranded off Coringa or Nursapura, in February 1821 or on 10 March 1821,. Her crew, passengers, mails, and part of the cargo were saved. Brilliant was later refloated and taken in to Coringo, India. The Nawab of Nellore purchased her. Captain Hall sailed her to Bengal, arriving at Calcutta on 23 July 1822. On her way she lost two anchors, upset her windlass, and damaged her rudder in the Eastern Channel.
