= Sarah Ann (ship) =

Several ships have borne the name Sarah Ann:

- Sarah Ann (1799 ship) (or Sarah & Ann), was a ship launched at Philadelphia in 1795. A French privateer captured her, but she was recaptured and sold. She returned to service and was last listed in 1806.
- Sarah Ann was a West Indiaman launched at Newcastle upon Tyne in 1800 that the Admiralty purchased in October 1803. As HMS Meteor she conducted bombardments at Havre de Grâce, the Dardanelles, and Rosas Bay, on the Spanish coast. She was sold in 1811. she then returned to mercantile service under her original name. Sarah Ann continued to trade, primarily across the North Atlantic. She was last listed in 1863 with stale data.
- Sarah Ann (1811 ship) was a 1-gun schooner built in Maryland and commissioned as a letter of marque at Baltimore in July 1812. HMS Rhodian captured her in September. Before her own capture, Sarah Ann captured the 10-gun brig Elizabeth in a notable single-ship action.
- Sarah Ann was a schooner built in 1831 by Dorgin and Baily at Fell's Point Baltimore. The US Navy purchased her in April and renamed her USS Sylph. She foundered without a trace, probably during a storm in August.
