= Sarah Ann =

Sarah Ann may refer to:

- Sarah Ann (1799 ship)
- Sarah Ann (1811 ship)
- Sarah Ann, West Virginia
