= List of shipwrecks in August 1851 =

The list of shipwrecks in August 1851 includes ships sunk, foundered, wrecked, grounded, or otherwise lost during August 1851.

== 1 August ==
List of shipwrecks: 1 August 1851
Ship	State	Description
Ann Grant	United Kingdom	The ship was driven ashore and wrecked at Londonderry, Nova Scotia, British North America. She was on a voyage from Londonderry to Cork.
Amalia	Brazil	The brigantine was captured by HMS Bonetta (Royal Navy) off Guarapari (20°37′S 40°18′W). As she was fitted out for the slave trade and was unfit to sail to Saint Helena, she was burnt and sank. All on board were handed over to the Brazilian authorities.
Perseverance	United Kingdom	The ship ran aground on the Glasgorman Bank, in the Irish Sea. She had been refloated by 13 August and taken in to Dublin.
Saxon Maid	United Kingdom	The ship was wrecked on Juan de Nova Island. Her crew survived.
Triumph	United Kingdom	The ship ran aground on Hog Island, County Limerick. She was on a voyage from America to Limerick.

== 2 August ==
List of shipwrecks: 2 August 1851
Ship	State	Description
Alexander Baring	United Kingdom	The ship ran aground on the Arklow Bank, in the Irish Sea off the coast of County Wicklow. She was on a voyage from Liverpool, Lancashire to Bombay, India. She was refloated and put in to Kingstown, County Dublin.
Snipe	United Kingdom	The ship capsized in the River Welland. She was righted.

== 3 August ==
List of shipwrecks: 3 August 1851
Ship	State	Description
Joseph Rodger	United Kingdom	The ship was destroyed by fire in the Mississippi River. She was on a voyage from New Orleans, Louisiana, United States to Liverpool, Lancashire.

== 4 August ==
List of shipwrecks: 4 August 1851
Ship	State	Description
Clauden	United Kingdom	The ship was driven ashore on Skagen, Denmark. She was on a voyage from Cardiff, Glamorgan to Saint Petersburg, Russia. She was refloated and taken in to Helsingør, Denmark.
Dorothy	United Kingdom	The ship struck a sunken rock and sank in the Black Sea 15 nautical miles (28 km) off Kertch, Russia. She was on a voyage from Constantinople, Ottoman Empire to Kertch.
Eliza Kincaid	United Kingdom	The ship departed from South Shields, County Durham for Quebec City, Province of Canada, British North America. No further trace, presumed foundered with the loss of all hands.
Goojerat	United Kingdom	The ship ran aground off Jerseyman Island, Nova Scotia, British North America. She was on a voyage from Liverpool, Lancashire to Arichat, Nova Scotia. Goojerat was refloated and taken in to Arichat, but was consequently condemned.
Leander	United Kingdom	The ship was driven ashore at Perth, Swan River Colony. She was later refloated and repaired.
Peruvian	United Kingdom	The ship was wrecked on the San Josi Rocks, Montevideo, Uruguay. She was on a voyage from Glasgow, Renfrewshire to Lima, Peru.
Victoria	United Kingdom	The ship was driven ashore on the coast of Caernarfonshire. She was on a voyage from "Laguna" to Liverpool, Lancashire. She was refloated with assistance from the smack Margarita (United Kingdom) and taken in to Pwllheli, Caernarfonshire

== 5 August ==
List of shipwrecks: 5 August 1851
Ship	State	Description
Minerva	Prussia	The ship ran aground and sank off "Westergarn", Gotland, Sweden. She was on a voyage from London, United Kingdom to Norrköping, Sweden.
Nouvelle Granade	France	The ship departed from Cartagena, Spain for Havre de Grâce, Seine-Inférieure. No further trace, presumed foundered with the loss of all hands.
Victor et Marie	France	The ship struck a sunken wreck and sank in Quiberon Bay. Her crew were rescued.

== 6 August ==
List of shipwrecks: 6 August 1851
Ship	State	Description
Helen Mar	United Kingdom	The ship was driven ashore at Little Harbour, Nova Scotia, British North America. She was on a voyage from Prince Edward Island, British North America to Cork. Also reported as lost on the east point of Prince Edward Island.
Lynter	United Kingdom	The ship was severely damaged by fire at Belfast, County Antrim.
Nouvelle Grenade	France	The ship departed from "Santa Martha" for Havre de Grâce, Seine-Inférieure. No further trace, presumed foundered with the loss of all hands.
Thetis	United Kingdom	The ship was driven ashore at L'Islet, Province of Canada, British North America. She was on a voyage from Liverpool, Lancashire to Quebec City, Province of Canada. She was refloated and taken in to Quebec City for repairs.
Wave	(United Kingdom of Great Britain and Ireland) New South Wales	The cutter was in collision with the ketch Warlock ( (United Kingdom of Great Britain and Ireland) ) New South Wales and sank off the Sydney Heads. Her crew were rescued. She was on a voyage from the Hunter River to Sydney.

== 7 August ==
List of shipwrecks: 7 August 1851
Ship	State	Description
John Hawkes	United Kingdom	The ship was abandoned in the Atlantic Ocean. Her crew were rescued by the brig Victoria (Prussia). John Hawkes was on a voyage from Prince Edward Island, British North America to Bristol, Gloucestershire. She was taken in to Liverpool, Lancashire in a derelict condition on 20 August.
Mirzapore	Netherlands	The ship ran aground on the Horsens Sandbank. She was on a voyage from Bahia, Brazil to Amsterdam, North Holland.

== 8 August ==
List of shipwrecks: 8 August 1851
Ship	State	Description
Lively	United Kingdom	The ship was wrecked on the south coast of Saint Croix. She was on a voyage from Newport, Monmouthshire to Havana, Cuba.

== 9 August ==
List of shipwrecks: 9 August 1851
Ship	State	Description
Dacotah	United States	The steamboat suffered a boiler explosion and sank with the loss of at least thirteen of the 58 people on board. She was on a voyage from Michigan to Minnesota.
James Boorman	Sweden	The barque was in collision with Royal Adelaide (United Kingdom and sank in the Atlantic Ocean. Her crew were rescued by Royal Adelaide. James Boorman was on a voyage from Batavia, Netherlands East Indies to Stockholm.
Reform	United Kingdom	The smack sank off Black Combe, Cumberland. Her crew were rescued by Prince of Wales (United Kingdom). Reform was on a voyage from Whitehaven, Cumberland to Liverpool, Lancashire.

== 10 August ==
List of shipwrecks: 10 August 1851
Ship	State	Description
Amandus	Sweden	The ship was in collision with Remembrance (United Kingdom and sank in the Baltic Sea off Hogland, Russia. Her crew were rescued.
Russia	United Kingdom	The ship was departed from Havana, Cuba for Cowes, Isle of Wight. No further trace, presumed foundered with the loss of all hands.
Whitehaven	United Kingdom	The steamship was damaged by fire at Liverpool, Lancashire.

== 11 August ==
List of shipwrecks: 11 August 1851
Ship	State	Description
Archimede	France	The schooner was destroyed by fire whilst on the stocks at Havre de Grâce, Seine-Inférieure.
Batieola	United Kingdom	The ship ran aground on the Cerebrus Rock off Arichat, Nova Scotia. She was on a voyage from Pugwash, Nova Scotia, British North America to Liverpool, Lancashire. She was refloated and put in to Arichat, where she was condemned.
Chieftain	United Kingdom	The tug suffered a boiler explosion and sank in the Clyde at Dumbarton, Dunbartonshire. Her crew were rescued by the brig she was towing.
Cygne	France	The steamship was damaged by fire whilst on the stocks at Havre de Grâce.
Normandie	France	The steamship was destroyed by fire whilst on the stocks at Havre de Grâce.
Perseverance	United Kingdom	The ship ran aground on the Glasgorman Bank, in the Irish Sea off the coast of County Dublin. She was on a voyage from Saint John, New Brunswick to Dublin. She was refloated the next day.

== 12 August ==
List of shipwrecks: 12 August 1851
Ship	State	Description
Brisk	(United Kingdom of Great Britain and Ireland) Guernsey	The pilot cutter was wrecked on the Longue-Pierre Rock. All six people on board survived.
Euxine	United Kingdom	The paddle steamer ran aground in the Dardanelles. She was refloated on 14 August and resumed her voyage to Constantinople, Ottoman Empire the next day.
Gipsy	(United Kingdom of Great Britain and Ireland) British North America	The steamship was lost in the Bay of Fundy. Her crew were rescued. She was on a voyage from Petitcodiac to Saint John, New Brunswick.

== 13 August ==
List of shipwrecks: 13 August 1851
Ship	State	Description
Advance	Sweden	The ship ran aground off Hamra, Gotland. She was on a voyage from Sundsvall to London, United Kingdom. She was refloated and resumed her voyage.
Batolica	(United Kingdom of Great Britain and Ireland) British North America	The barque ran aground and sank off Arichat, Nova Scotia. She was on a voyage from Pugwash to Liverpool, Nova Scotia. She was refloated with assistance from HMRC Daring ( Board of Customs) and towed in to Arichat.
Bowes	United Kingdom	The ship ran aground in the River Tyne at Hebburn, Northumberland. She was on a voyage from Dalhousie, New Brunswick, British North America to Newcastle upon Tyne, Northumberland.
Roza	Portugal	The brig was wrecked 3 nautical miles (5.6 km) north of Cape Frio, Brazil.

== 14 August ==
List of shipwrecks: 14 August 1851
Ship	State	Description
Catherine and Margaret	United Kingdom	The ship ran aground on the Foreness Rock, Margate, Kent. She was on a voyage from London to Dublin.
Isabella	United Kingdom	The ship ran aground in the Gulf of Smyrna. She was on a voyage from Smyrna, Ottoman Empire to Liverpool, Lancashire. She was refloated on 16 August and put back to Smyrna.
Jane	United Kingdom	The ship was driven ashore at Bridport, Dorset. She was on a voyage from Plymouth, Devon to Bridport.

== 15 August ==
List of shipwrecks: 15 August 1851
Ship	State	Description
Martha	Norway	The schooner struck the quayside and was damaged at Rye, Sussex, United Kingdom.

== 16 August ==
List of shipwrecks: 16 August 1851
Ship	State	Description
Acushnet	United States	The 359-ton whaler was wrecked on St. Lawrence Island in the Bering Sea due to a combination of fog, ice, and a gale and sank in 60 feet (18 m) of water. Her captain and crew survived.
Alvarada	United States	The brig was run down and sunk in the Atlantic Ocean by the steamship Pacific (United States). Her crew were rescued by Pacific.
Amandus	Sweden	The sloop collided with Remembrance (United Kingdom) and foundered in the Baltic Sea off Hogland, Russia. Her crew were rescued.
Pandora	United Kingdom	The ship was driven ashore on Stroma, Caithness. She was on a voyage from South Shields, County Durham to Dublin. She was refloated on 18 August.

== 17 August ==
List of shipwrecks: 17 August 1851
Ship	State	Description
Brazil Packet	United Kingdom	The ship was driven ashore at Puerto Plata, Dominican Republic. She was consequently condemned.
Good Intent	United Kingdom	The ship ran aground on the Middle Sand, in the North Sea off the coast of Kent. She was on a voyage from Hartlepool, County Durham to Whitstable, Kent. She was refloated and taken in to Whitstable in a leaky condition.
James	United Kingdom	The schooner was driven ashore at Kingsdown, Kent. She was on a voyage from Middlesbrough, Yorkshire to Exeter, Devon. She was refloated and resumed her voyage.
John Rickinson	United Kingdom	The ship was driven ashore at Whitby, Yorkshire. Her crew were rescued. She was refloated on 18 August and taken in to Whitby.
Lancashire Witch	United Kingdom	The barque was wrecked on a reef north of Barbados with the loss of seven of her eleven crew. She was on a voyage from Liverpool, Lancashire to Puerto Rico.
Matchless	United Kingdom	The ship ran aground on the Gunfleet Sand, in the North Sea off the coast of Essex. She was on a voyage from London to Seaham, County Durham or vice versa. She was refloated.
Tomlinson	United Kingdom	The brig was wrecked off Lagos, Nigeria. Her crew were rescued.
Vaselake	Ottoman Empire	The ship was wrecked near Cape St. Vincent, Spain. Her crew were rescued. She was on a voyage from Galway, United Kingdom to Constantinople.
William Foster	(United Kingdom of Great Britain and Ireland) Cape Colony	The schooner was wrecked at Cape Recife. All on board were rescued.

== 18 August ==
List of shipwrecks: 18 August 1851
Ship	State	Description
Frederick	United Kingdom	The brig was wrecked at Arecibo, Puerto Rico.
Glide	United Kingdom	The brig was wrecked at Arecibo.
Junge Heinrich	Duchy of Holstein	The ship was driven ashore at Saint Croix, Virgin Islands. She was consequently condemned.
Leo	United Kingdom	The schooner was driven ashore and wrecked at Puerto Plata, Dominican Republic.
Mary	United Kingdom	The brig was wrecked at Arecibo.
Prince of Wales	(United Kingdom of Great Britain and Ireland) Dominica	The sloop was driven ashore and wrecked at Point Town, Saint Kitts with the loss of a crew member.
Regulator	(United Kingdom of Great Britain and Ireland) Antigua	The sloop departed from Montserrat for Antigua. No further trace, presumed foundered with the loss of all hands.
Rosetta	(United Kingdom of Great Britain and Ireland) Dominica	The sloop was driven ashore at Cabaret, Haiti.
Scotia	United Kingdom	The brig was wrecked at Arecibo.

== 19 August ==
List of shipwrecks: 19 August 1851
Ship	State	Description
Austria	United Kingdom	The ship ran aground at Liverpool, Lancashire. She was on a voyage from Philadelphia, Pennsylvania, United States to Liverpool.
Clementina	United Kingdom	The ship sprang a leak and was beached at Dartmouth, Devon. She was on a voyage from Liverpool to London.
Duncan	United Kingdom	The ship was driven ashore at Leith, Lothian. She was on a voyage from Leith to the Cape of Good Hope, Cape Colony. She was refloated and taken in to Leith.
Eliza	(United Kingdom of Great Britain and Ireland) British North America	The ship was driven ashore at Baracoa, Cuba and was abandoned. She was subsequently repaired in situ.
I. K. L.	United Kingdom	The ship ran aground at Liverpool.

== 20 August ==
List of shipwrecks: 20 August 1851
Ship	State	Description
Ann Alexander	United States	The whaler was attacked and sunk in the Pacific Ocean by a sperm whale. Her 22 crew survived.
Emilie	Prussia	The brig was driven ashore and wrecked in Onega Bay.

== 21 August ==
List of shipwrecks: 21 August 1851
Ship	State	Description
Conde de Luchana	Dominican Republic	The ship was driven ashore at Barnegat, New Jersey, United States. She was on a voyage from Puerto Plata to New York, United States. She had become a wreck by 1 September.
Johannes	United Kingdom	The barque was driven ashore and wrecked 8 nautical miles (15 km) south of the entrance to San Francisco Bay. She was on a voyage from Valparaíso, Chile to San Francisco, California, United States.
USS Mississippi	United States Navy	The paddle frigate ran aground off Smyrna, Ottoman Empire. She was refloated on 26 August.
Science	United Kingdom	The brig was wrecked on Castle Island, Bermuda. Her crew were rescued.

== 22 August ==
List of shipwrecks: 22 August 1851
Ship	State	Description
Arrow	United Kingdom	America's Cup: The cutter ran aground between Bonchurch and Ventnor, Isle of Wight. She was refloated with assistance from the steamship Majesty (United Kingdom).
Harp	(United Kingdom of Great Britain and Ireland) British North America	The ship was driven ashore and wrecked on Ragged Island, Maine, United States. She was on a voyage from Portland, Maine to Walton, Nova Scotia.
Nina	Norway	The ship was wrecked near Lysekil, Sweden. Her crew were rescued. She was on a voyage from London, United Kingdom to Sundsvall, Sweden.

== 23 August ==
List of shipwrecks: 23 August 1851
Ship	State	Description
Catherine	United States	The ship was driven ashore at East Hampton, New York. All on board, more than 300 people, were rescued. She was on a voyage from Dram, Norway to New York City. She was refloated on 16 September and taken in to New York City.
Fernando	Spain	The brig was wrecked at Cape San Blas, Florida, United States with some loss of life. There were 56 survivors.
Jessie	United Kingdom	The ship was wrecked between Brodick and Lamlash, Isle of Arran. Her crew were rescued.
Prosperity	United Kingdom	The smack was driven ashore north of Harrington, Cumberland. She had become a wreck by 25 August.

== 24 August ==
List of shipwrecks: 24 August 1851
Ship	State	Description
Adelina Sophia	Netherlands	The koff was driven ashore in the Heller. She was refloated two days later and taken in to Carolinensiel, Kingdom of Hanover.
Chariot	United Kingdom	The ship ran aground on a reef off Hogland, Russia. She was on a voyage from Hull, Yorkshire to Kronstadt, Russia. She sank on 27 August.
Commerce	United Kingdom	The brig was driven ashore in the Canary Islands.
Farmer	United Kingdom	The sailing barge sank off Warden Point, Isle of Sheppey, Kent. She was on a voyage from Hullbridge to Bromley-by-Bow, Essex. She was refloated on 26 August and towed in to Whitstable, Kent.
Helena	United Kingdom	The ship was wrecked on the Lobeira Rocks. She was on a voyage from Galaţi, Ottoman Empire to Queenstown, County Cork.
Robert Sherrat	United Kingdom	The sloop sank in the River Mersey during a squall with the loss of all hands. She was refloated on 27 August and taken in to Woodside, Cheshire.

== 25 August ==
List of shipwrecks: 25 August 1851
Ship	State	Description
Bolton Abbey	United Kingdom	The ship was driven ashore and wrecked at Sydney, New South Wales.
Britannia	United Kingdom	The brig was wrecked in the Pamahiba River, Brazil. Her crew were rescued.
Countess of Minto	United Kingdom	The ship sank in a squall at Sydney.
Eversdale	United Kingdom	The brig was wrecked at Wilmington, North Carolina. She was on a voyage from Matanzas, Cuba to Halifax, Nova Scotia, British North America.
John	United Kingdom	The smack capsized in Liverpool Bay with the loss of all six of her crew.
John Bryan	United Kingdom	The full-rigged ship was driven ashore and wrecked on Dog Island, Florida, United States.
Magnolia	United States	The steamship was wrecked at Old Woman's Bluff, Florida.
Paxton	United Kingdom	The brig was driven ashore on Cape Sable Island, Nova Scotia, British North America. She was on a voyage from Parrsboro, Nova Scotia to Liverpool. She was refloated and put in to Halifax, Nova Scotia, where she arrived on 4 September in a leaky condition.

== 26 August ==
List of shipwrecks: 26 August 1851
Ship	State	Description
Agent	United States	The sloop sank at Greenport, New York.
Armantine	France	The ship was driven ashore in the Falkland Islands. Her crew were rescued. She was on a voyage from Havre de Grâce to Callao, Peru. She had broken up by 23 September.
Clinker	United Kingdom	The ship foundered in the North Sea off Texel, North Holland, Netherlands. Her crew were rescued. She was on a voyage from Sunderland, County Durham to Schiedam, South Holland, Netherlands.
Grasshopper	United Kingdom	The ship ran aground off Hirsholmene, Denmark. She was on a voyage from Kronstadt, Russia to Truro, Cornwall. She was refloated and taken in to Frederikshavn, Denmark.
Harriet	United States	The schooner capsized, was driven ashore and wrecked on Block Island, Rhode Island. Her crew survived.
Hero	United Kingdom	The schooner was driven ashore at Lytham St Annes, Lancashire. She was refloated.
Intellect	United Kingdom	The ship was driven ashore and wrecked on Anholt, Denmark. She was on a voyage from Newcastle upon Tyne, Northumberland to Danzig.
Margaret Dowar	United Kingdom	The ship was wrecked on Cape Sable Island, Nova Scotia, British North America. Her crew were rescued. She was on a voyage from the Clyde to New York, United States.
Superior	United States	The schooner was driven ashore and wrecked on Block Island.
Vrouw Maria	Kingdom of Hanover	The ship was driven ashore on Spiekeroog. She was refloated on 1 September.

== 27 August ==
List of shipwrecks: 27 August 1851
Ship	State	Description
Adelaide	United Kingdom	The ship was driven ashore near Varberg, Sweden. She was on a voyage from Pori, Grand Duchy of Finland to London. She was refloated and resumed her voyage.
Fanny	United Kingdom	The brig was driven ashore. She was on a voyage from San Francisco, California, United States to San Blas. She was refloated.
Hindostan	United Kingdom	The vessel foundered in the Atlantic Ocean with the loss of nine of her sixteen crew. Survivors took to a boat. They were rescued on 27 September by the schooner Martha Greenow ( (United Kingdom of Great Britain and Ireland) British North America). Hindostan was on a voyage from Whitby, Yorkshire to Quebec City, Province of Canada, British North America.
Lady Huntley	United Kingdom	The ship ran aground off Sprogø, Denmark. She was on a voyage from Liverpool, Lancashire to Flensburg, Duchy of Schleswig. She was refloated the next day and take in to Nyborg, Denmark.
Louise Josephine	France	The ship struck the Navestone Rock, off the Farne Islands, Northumberland, United Kingdom. She floated off and drifted out to sea. Her crew were rescued by a pilot boat. Louise Josephine was on a voyage from Anstruther, Fife, United Kingdom to Saint-Valery-sur-Somme, Somme.
Margaret Parker	(United Kingdom of Great Britain and Ireland) British North America	The ship was lost whilst on a voyage from Newfoundland to Sydney, Nova Scotia. Her crew were rescued.
Polito	Kingdom of Sardinia	The ship ran aground on the North and South Rocks, in the Irish Sea. She was refloated and take in to Belfast, County Antrim, United Kingdom.
Sophia	United States	The schooner was wrecked on the coast of Newfoundland.

== 28 August ==
List of shipwrecks: 28 August 1851
Ship	State	Description
Erinneerung	Prussia	The ship foundered in the North Sea. Her crew were rescued by the steamship Director (United Kingdom). Erinneerung was on a voyage from Königsberg to London, United Kingdom.
Lafayette	United States	The steamship was destroyed by fire at Chagres, Panama.
Maria	United Kingdom	The ship was wrecked off "Kyrkesand", Sweden with the loss of four of her nine crew. She was on a voyage from Devonport, Devon to Memel, Prussia.
Urgent	United Kingdom	The barque was driven ashore in Lynhaven Bay. She was on a voyage from New York to Wilmington, North Carolina, United States.

== 29 August ==
List of shipwrecks: 29 August 1851
Ship	State	Description
Agelique	Flag unknown	The ship was driven ashore and wrecked near Kalmar, Sweden.
Friends	United Kingdom	The barque ran aground and sank at Sarawak. Her crew were rescued. She was on a voyage from Singapore to Sarawak.
Grampus	(United Kingdom of Great Britain and Ireland) New Zealand	The schooner was caught by a heavy gale while riding at anchor in the Bay of Plenty and driven on shore. All hands were saved.
Saint Petersburg	Russia	The brig was driven ashore on Saaremaa.

== 30 August ==
List of shipwrecks: 30 August 1851
Ship	State	Description
Commerce	United States	The brig was driven ashore on Craney Island, North Carolina.
E. P. Mackrell	United States	The steamboat was destroyed by fire at Memphis, Tennessee.
Tamar	United Kingdom	The schooner was in collision with the steamship Rose (United Kingdom) and sank in the English Channel. Her eight crew were rescued by Rose. Tamar was on a voyage from Newcastle upon Tyne, Northumberland to Plymouth, Devon.
Urgent	United States	The brig was driven ashore near Lynnhaven, Virginia. She was on a voyage from New York to Wilmington, Delaware. She was consequently condemned.

== 31 August ==
List of shipwrecks: 31 August 1851
Ship	State	Description
Albertine	United Kingdom	The ship was wrecked off Ameland, Friesland, Netherlands with the loss of a crew member. She was on a voyage from Dram, Norway to Plymouth, Devon.
Amethyst	United Kingdom	The brig foundered in the North Sea 40 nautical miles (74 km) east of Flamborough Head, Yorkshire. Her crew were rescued by the lugger Albert (France). Amethyst was on a voyage from Sunderland, County Durham to Saint Petersburg, Russia.
Cervantes	United Kingdom	The ship foundered 7 nautical miles (13 km) off Flamborough Head. Her crew survived. She was on a voyage from South Shields, County Durham to London.
Enigheten	(Russian Empire) Grand Duchy of Finland	The ship was wrecked on Gotland, Sweden. She was on a voyage from Raumo to Holbæk, Denmark.
Gannet	United Kingdom	The smack was driven ashore and severely damaged on Stroma, Caithness. She was on a voyage from Wick, Caithness to the Orkney Islands. She was refloated and beached in a severely leaky condition.
Governor Davis	United Kingdom	The full-rigged ship ran aground in the Bogueron Passage. She was on a voyage from the Chincha Islands to Callao, Peru. Attempts by USS Raritan (United States Navy) to refloat her were unsuccessful and she was abandoned.
Maria	United Kingdom	The schooner ran aground on the Callam Bank, in the Strait of Malacca and was abandoned. She was on a voyage from Calcutta, India to Penang, Malaya and Liverpool, Lancashire. She subsequently floated off and was taken in to Malacca, Malaya.
Maria Rose	United Kingdom	The sloop was driven ashore and severely damaged at Liverpool, Lancashire.
Orion	Sweden	The ship ran aground on the Haisborough Sands, in the North Sea off the coast of Norfolk, United Kingdom and was abandoned. Her crew were rescued. She was on a voyage from Härnösand to Lisbon, Portugal/ Orion was later refloated and towed in to Great Yarmouth, Norfolk.
William and Thomas	United Kingdom	The ship was driven ashore and wrecked at Fort Ricasoli, Malta.

== Unknown date ==
List of shipwrecks: Unknown date in August 1851
Ship	State	Description
Argo	United Kingdom	The ship was in collision with Industry (United Kingdom) and was abandoned. Her crew were resccued by Industry.
Flying Dutchman	(United Kingdom of Great Britain and Ireland) Van Diemen's Land	The brig ran aground and sank at Adelaide, South Australia before 9 October. She was on a voyage from Hobart to Adelaide.
Claudia	United Kingdom	The ship was driven ashore on Skagen, Denmark. She was on a voyage from Cardiff, Glamorgan to Saint Petersburg, Russia. She was refloated and put in to Helsingør, Denmark, where she arrived on 4 August.
Eudora	United Kingdom	The ship was wrecked in Poverty Bay. She was on a voyage from Canterbury, New Zealand to Sydney, New South Wales.
Jos	United Kingdom	The flat was wrecked between Crosby and Formby, Lancashire with the loss of at least one life.
Juliet	(United Kingdom of Great Britain and Ireland) British North America	The ship was abandoned in the Atlantic Ocean before 18 August.
Juverna	(United Kingdom of Great Britain and Ireland) British North America	The ship capsized and was abandoned in the Atlantic Ocean in a squall. She was subsequently towed in to Gloucester, Massachusetts, United States.
La Coquette	France	The barque was abandoned in the Atlantic Ocean off the coast of Senegal before 21 August. She was subsequently taken in to Gibraltar by a French Navy crew, arriving on that date.
Marion	Kingdom of Sardinia	The brig was wrecked on the Caravella Bank, off the coast of Brazil. Her crew were rescued. She was on a voyage from Buenos Aires, Argentina to Bahia, Brazil.
Phœnix	Norway	The ship was driven ashore at Mågerø between 20 and 26 August.
Pizarro	Spanish Navy	The paddle steamer ran aground and was wrecked at Bahía Honda, Cuba. Her pilot was executed by the commander of the troops on board, suspecting him of being a supporter of Narcisco López and running her aground deliberately.
Rachel	(United Kingdom of Great Britain and Ireland) Antigua	The ship was driven ashore at Montserrat. Her crew were rescued. She was on a voyage from Dominica to Antigua.
Razee	Portugal	The brig was wrecked 3 nautical miles (5.6 km) north of Cape Frio, Brazil.
Recovery	United Kingdom	The ship was driven ashore on the coast of Denmark. She was on a voyage from London to Riga, Russia. She was refloated and put in to Helsingør, where she arrived on 13 August.
Scandia	Sweden	The steamship was destroyed by fire at Kalmar.
Silea	United Kingdom	The ship foundered in the Atlantic Ocean before 29 August. Her crew were rescued. She was on a voyage from Port Dundas, Renfrewshire to Hamburg.
Speculation	United Kingdom	The ship was driven ashore near "Kolibke", Prussia. She was refloated and taken in to Danzig, where she arrived on 20 August.
Spy	United Kingdom	The ship was wrecked in St. Francis Bay before 25 August.
Varvaki	Greece	The ship was lost at Cavo D'Oro, Euboea. Her crew were rescued. She was on a voyage from Constantinople, Ottoman Empire to Queenstown, County Cork of Falmouth, Cornwall, United Kingdom.
Victoria	United Kingdom	The ship was driven ashore near Pwllheli, Caernarfonshire. She was on a voyage from Laguna to Liverpool. She was refloated on 10 August with assistance from the smack Margarets (United Kingdom) and resumed her voyage.
Vigilant	United Kingdom	The ship was wrecked on the Anegada Reef. Her crew survived. She was on a voyage from Trinidad to the United States.
Vine	United Kingdom	The ship was driven ashore on the coast of Cuba before 1 September. She was on a voyage from Havana to Matanzas. She was refloated and taken in to Havana.
