= Harriot (1784 ship) =

History

Great Britain
- Name: Harriet
- Builder: Thames
- Renamed: Dominica Packet (circa 1787)
- Fate: Foundered circa January 1821

General characteristics
- Tons burthen: 231, or 232, or 250 (bm)
- Complement: 1798: 40; 1808:30
- Armament: 1798: 18 × 6-pounder guns; 1808:2 × 6-pounder guns + 10 × 12-pounder carronades; 1812:10 × 6-pounder guns

Harriot was launched in 1784, on the Thames as a West Indiaman. Her owners may have intended to send her to the South Seas as a whaler in 1786, but there is no evidence that she actually made such a voyage. A new owner renamed her Dominica Packet around 1787. She then spent her career primarily sailing between Britain and the West Indies. During her career she, together with two other Liverpool letters of marque, captured a valuable Spanish merchantman. Later, Harriot captured a Dutch East Indiaman. A Baltimore privateer captured Dominica Packet in 1813, but the British Royal Navy quickly recaptured her. She foundered circa January 1821.

== Career ==
Harriot first appeared in Lloyd's Register (LR) in 1786.

| Year | Master | Owner | Trade | Source & notes |
|---|---|---|---|---|
| 1786 | A.Walton | I.Rigg & Co. | London–South Seas | LR |
| 1787 | A.Walton; J.Banks | I.Rigg & Co. | London–South Seas | LR; "Now the Dominica Packet, Banks" |

Although Lloyd's Register showed Harriet sailing to the South Seas Fishery, and two sources on the trade, probably drawing on Lloyd's Register, says the same thing, there is no evidence in Lloyd's List's ship arrival and departure data, or in any other newspaper of the period available online, of any such voyages for Harriot, or Harriet.

Captain John Banks purchased Harriot and renamed her Dominica Packet. He then sailed her between England and Dominica. (Note: One source misnames the vessel as Dunning Packet.)

| Year | Master | Owner | Trade | Source & notes |
|---|---|---|---|---|
| 1787 | John Banks | Captain & Co. | London–Dominica | LR |
| 1789 | Boutfloor | Banks & Co. | London–Dominica | LR |
| 1793 | G.Gray | Lubbock | London–Leghorn | LR |
| 1797 | G.Gray; W.A.Meriton | Lubbock; J.Lee | London–Straits; London–Barbados | LR |
| 1798 | W.A.Meriton; J.Ferguson | J.Lee | London–Barbados; Liverpool–Barbados | LR |

Captain John Ferguson acquired a letter of marque on 16 July 1798. On 13 November 1798, Dominica Packet came upon the hulk of a schooner at 24°N 63°W. The schooner had lost her masts and her crew had abandoned her. On her stern she bore the legend "Sam, Trackle, of Baltimore".

| Year | Master | Owner | Trade | Source & notes |
|---|---|---|---|---|
| 1799 | J.Ferguson | J.Bennett | Liverpool–Barbados | LR |
| 1801 | J.Ferguson | J.Bennett | Liverpool–Barbados | LR |

Capture of Galga: Alfred, Dominica Packet, and Intrepid, all Liverpool letters of marque, were sailing in company with Captain John Pettigrew of Intrepid serving as commodore of the squadron, when on 22 June 1801, they encountered the Spanish frigate-built ship Galgo at 18°25′N 40°10′W. Galgo had visited several ports but was most recently from Rio de Plate. The British gave chase and after an engagement of almost two hours succeeded in capturing Galgo. Galgo, of 600 tons (bm), was armed with twenty-four six-pounder guns and had a crew of 78 men under the command of Francisco de Pascadeilo. Intrepid had one man killed and sustained some damage. Alfred and Dominica Packet had no damage or casualties. The three British ships and their prize arrived at Barbados on 4 July. Galgo was carrying a cargo of hides, cocoa, indigo, and bar copper. She had been carrying her cargo to Cadiz or any other Spanish port. (Note: The British vessels had a combined heavier broadside and larger crew than Galga. Intrepid's letter of marque showed her with twenty 9&18-pounder cannons and 50 men. Alfred's letter of marque showed her with eighteen 9&24-pounder cannons and 16 men.) One report put the value of Galgo at £60,000. (Note: Prize money was paid to Alfred in January 1812.)

On 28 November Dominica Packet was at Cork when a storm capsized Dumfries, which had her master and four men aboard. Boats from Dominica Packet and four other vessels rescued the men, but at great risk to themselves and not without great difficulty. Dominica Packet's boat overturned but the men were able to right her and bail her out.

| Year | Master | Owner | Trade | Source |
|---|---|---|---|---|
| 1804 | Ferguson; R.H.Caitcheon | J.Bennett; J.G.Foderingham | Bristol–Barbados | LR |

Captain Caitcheon, in May 1804, delivered to Liverpool 29 tons of dyewood, 157 hogsheads and 22 barrels of sugar, 238 bales of cotton, 145 pieces of lignum vitae, 27 casks and 189 bags of coffee, three bags of ginger, seven casks of tamarind, 2 casks cocoa corder. (Note: Robert Hunter Caitcheon had earlier been captain of Harriot and Cam's Delight.)

On 12 May 1805, as Dominica Packet was sailing from Liverpool to Barbados, she sighted a French fleet near Martinique. One frigate briefly gave chase but then returned to the fleet.

| Year | Master | Owner | Trade | Source & notes |
|---|---|---|---|---|
| 1805 | R.H.Caitcheon; Gillespie | J.G.Foderingham | Liverpool–Barbados | LR; repairs 1804 & damages repaired 1805 |
| 1807 | Gillespie; J.Cowell | J.G.Foderingham | Liverpool–Barbados | LR; repairs 1804, damages repaired 1805, large repair 1807 |

In 1807, Dominica Packet, Cowall, master, captured a Dutch East Indiaman sailing under American colours and brought her into Trinidad.

| Year | Master | Owner | Trade | Source & notes |
|---|---|---|---|---|
| 1808 | J.Cowell; T.Rising | Taylor & Co. | London–Trinidad | LR; large repair 1807 |

Captain J.Rising acquired a letter of marque on 24 October 1808. In 1809, Dominica Packet sailed up the Pará River to the port of Parra. She was the first British vessel ever to call there. Her captain fired a salute and the inhabitants greeted her with great hospitality. When Dominica Packet, Rising, master, returned to Liverpool from Para she fell over in the dock and proceeded to fill with water at every tide.

| Year | Master | Owner | Trade | Source & notes |
|---|---|---|---|---|
| 1810 | T.Rising; T.Hea | Taylor & Co. | London–Trinidad; Liverpool–Brazils | LR; large repair 1807 |
| 1811 | T.Hea | Gladstone | Liverpool–Newfoundland | LR; large repair 1807 |
| 1813 | T.Hea | Gladstone | Liverpool–Newfoundland | LR; large repair 1807 & repair 1813 |

Capture and recapture: on 6 March 1813, Dominica Packet, of Liverpool, was sailing from Demerara bound for St. Thomas with rum, sugar, cotton, and coffee when she encountered the Baltimore privateer Comet. Comet captured Dominica Packet in sight of St Thomas. (Note: For Captain Thomas Boyle's account of the cruise in which he captured Dominica Packet, among numerous other vessels, see the extract from Comet's log book.) HMS Variable recaptured Dominica Packet on 13 March. Dominica Packet, Hex, master, arrived at Nassau on 28 March.

Dominica Packet sailed from New Providence on 18 May, together with some other merchantmen, all under convoy by HMS Variable. Dominica Packet arrived at Liverpool on 3 July.

| Year | Master | Owner | Trade | Source |
|---|---|---|---|---|
| 1818 | J.Davis | Gladstones | Liverpool–Madeira; Liverpool–Brazils | LR; repair 1807, repair 1813, large repair 1817 |
| 1819 | J.Davis; White | Gladstones | Liverpool–Brazils | LR; large repair 1807 & 1817 |
| 1820 | White | Gladstones | Liverpool–Derry | LR; large repair 1807 & 1817 |

As Dominica Packet was sailing from Londonderry to New York she had to put into Strangford leaky. She then moved about a mile to Portaferry where she was to unload her cargo and repair.

== Fate ==
Dominica Packet foundered in the Atlantic Ocean in January 1821. Midas, of the United States, rescued her crew and passengers, and delivered them to Lisbon on 27 January. Dominica Packet was on a voyage from Londonderry to New York.
