= George R. Roberts (privateer) =

American privateer

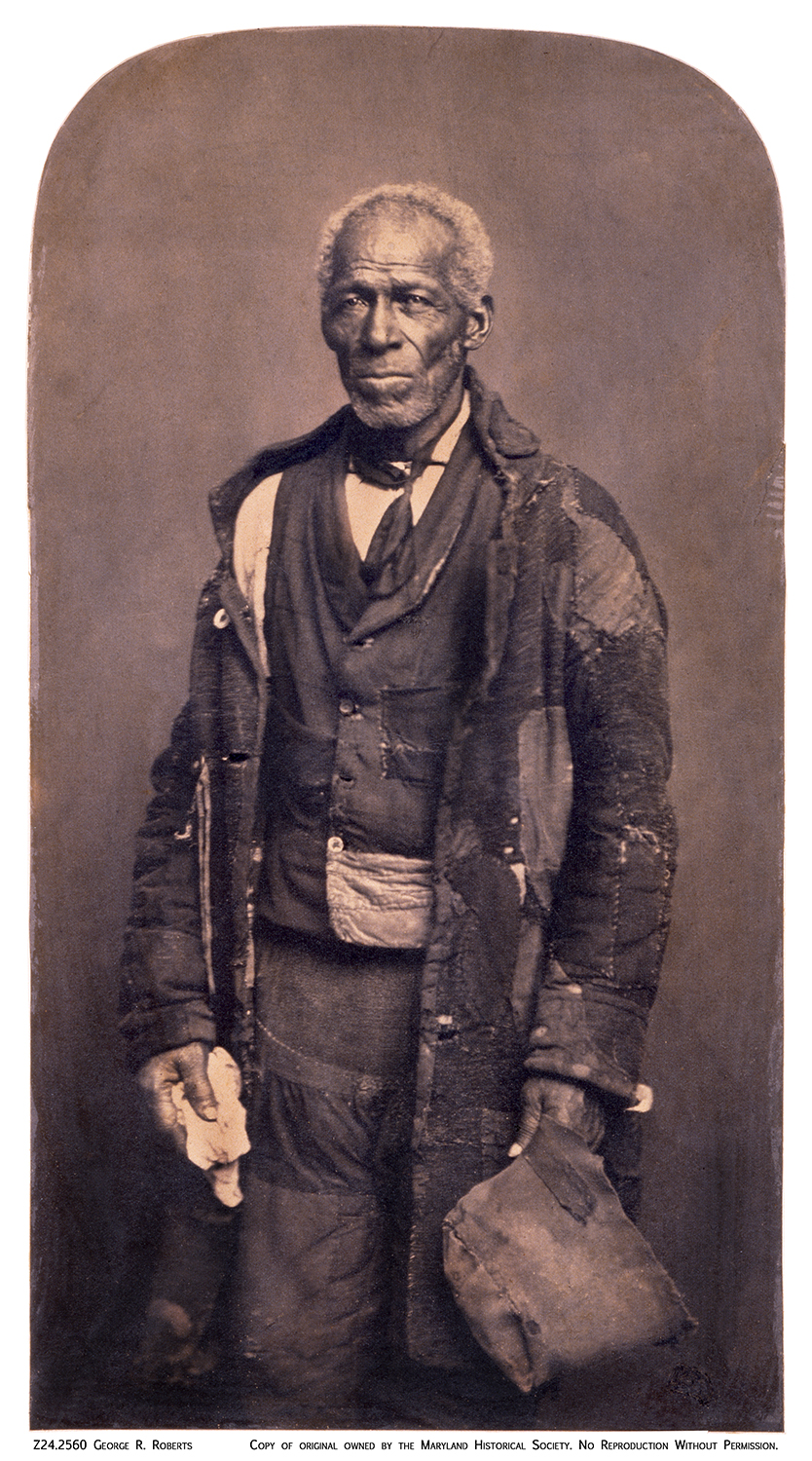
- Portrait of George R. Roberts by Daniel and David Bendann at H. Furlong Baldwin Library, Maryland Historical Society, Baltimore. C. 1859-1865.
- Born: 1766; Baltimore, Maryland
- Died: 14 January 1861 (aged 94–95); Baltimore, Maryland
- Occupation: Privateer
- Known for: Privateer in the War of 1812

George R. Roberts (1766 – 14 January 1861) was an American privateer in the War of 1812.

== Aboard the Sarah Ann ==
He began his career as a privateer in July 1812, a month after the start of the war, sailing from his native Baltimore on Captain Richard Moon's privateer Sarah Ann. The next month, in the Bahamas, their ship attacked and captured a British ship transiting from Kingston, Jamaica to London, England and brought its cargo of sugar and coffee to Savannah, Georgia. Back in the Bahamas on 13 September 1812, the Sarah Ann was captured by HMS Redbridge. Roberts was among six sailors accused of being British deserters, but Captain Moon asserted him "a native born of the United States [with] every sufficient document, together with free papers."

== Aboard the Chasseur ==
Released from British custody and back in Baltimore, in July 1814 he signed on as a gunner under Captain Thomas Boyle on the privateer Chasseur, called the "Pride of Baltimore." After sinking seventeen ships and declaring a facetious paper blockade of the British Isles, the Chasseur returned, passing Fort McHenry on 8 April 1815, with Roberts and the other crew welcomed as war heroes. According to Boyle, Roberts "displayed the most intrepid courage."

== Later life ==
In civilian life Roberts worked as a sawyer and laborer, living in numerous locations, many in Fell's Point. At his death on 14 January 1861 he was remembered in the Baltimore Sun:

For a number of years past an aged colored man, named George Roberts, has been allowed to parade with the military of the city on all occasions of importance, and was generally mounted as a servant to the major-general of the division. He died on Monday night, at the advanced age of ninety-five years, at his residence, at Canton. Old George was among those who took up arms in defense of the city of Baltimore in 1814, and throughout his long life was always highly thought of by the citizen soldiery.
