= Hibernia (1810 ship) =

British ship launched at Cowes in 1810

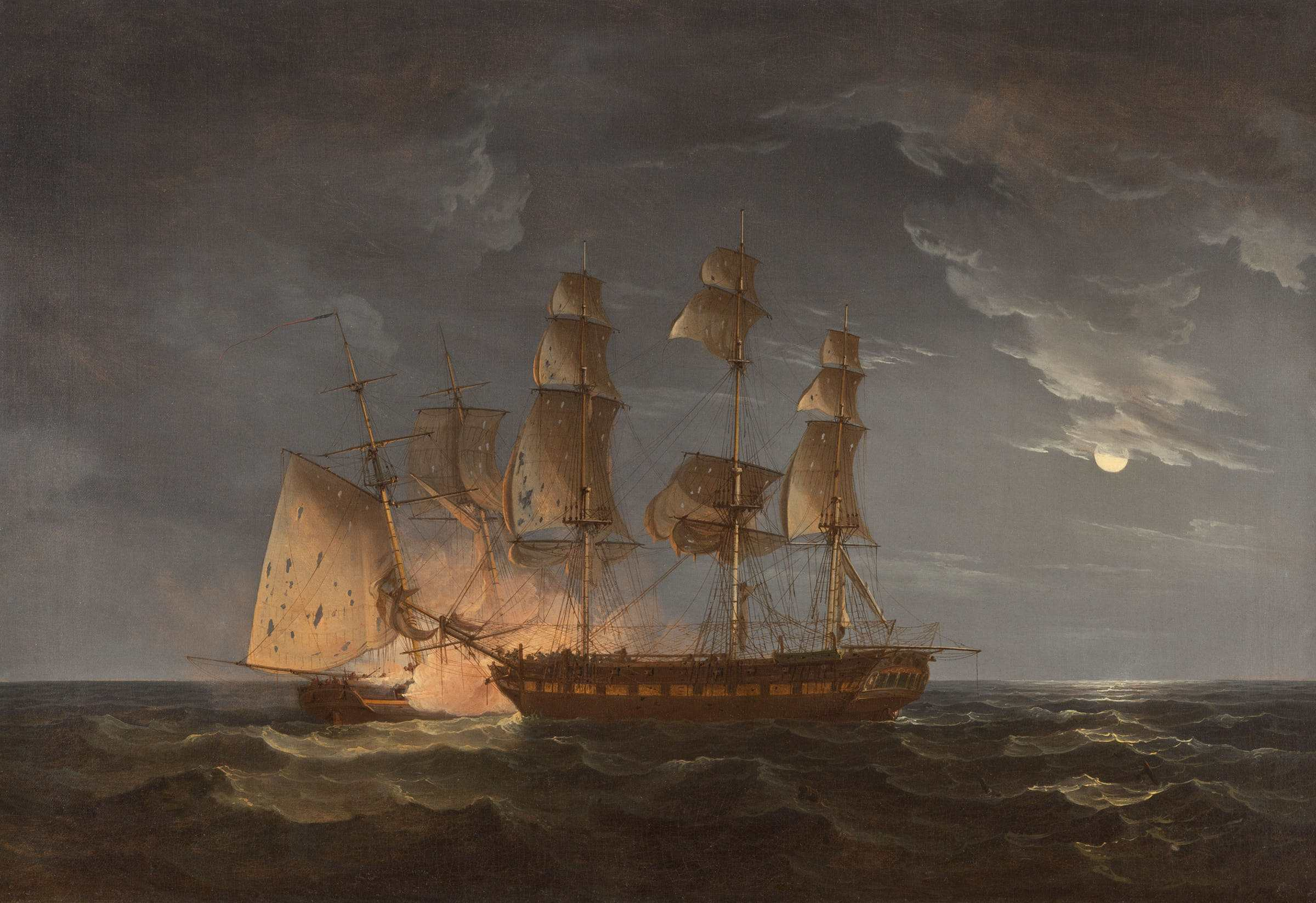
- 12 at Midnight; The Hibernia Attempting to Run the Comet Down, 1814; Thomas Whitcombe, Smithsonian National Portrait Gallery

History

United Kingdom
- Name: Hibernia
- Builder: Cowes
- Launched: 1810
- Fate: Last listed in Lloyd's Register in 1840

General characteristics
- Tons burthen: 430, or 432, or 435 (bm)
- Propulsion: Sails
- Sail plan: Brig
- Complement: 1810:45; 1814:22
- Armament: 1810:18 × 18-pounder carronades + 2 × 9-pounder chase guns; 1814:6 guns

Hibernia, of 435 tons (bm), was launched at Cowes in 1810. She operated as a letter of marque West Indiaman and in 1814, engaged in a noteworthy single-ship action with the American privateer Comet during which she repelled her more heavily armed attacker. In 1819, she transported convicts to Van Diemen's Land. She was last listed in 1840.

== Career ==
Hibernia entered Lloyd's Register (LR) in 1810, with J. "Lennen" master. He was also her owner. Her trade was Cowes-West Indies.

Captain John Lennon received a letter of marque on 5 February 1810.

On 26 January 1811, Westmoreland, of Liverpool, ran foul of Hibernia off Scilly, causing Hibernia to lose her bowsprit, head, and cutwater. Hibernia, which had sailing from London to St Thomas's, put back into Portsmouth on 1 March.

In 1812, orders were issued that no vessels should leave St Thomas's without convoy, on account of the American privateers. Hibernia and three other merchantmen, whose aggregate cargoes were valued at half a million sterling, had long been waiting. Unwilling to detain them further, Governor Maclean had agreed to their sailing without convoy, on condition that Lennon hoist his pennant as commodore. Lennon had to post a bond of £500 that he would execute the duties of commodore; the other three captains had to post bonds of £250 each that they would follow signals and obey orders. Although Rossie, Commodore Joshua Barney, an American privateer of superior force, harassed the British vessels, Lennon brought them safe into the English Channel on 18 October 1812. He also repatriated the mate and crew of the packet Princess Amelia, which Rossie had earlier captured.

In late 1812 or early 1813, Hibernia captured a Swedish schooner carrying 900 barrels of flour. The American privateer Orders in Council captured the schooner from Hibernia's prize crew. HMS Scorpion in turn captured the schooner from the Americans and sent her into Antigua.

On 24 November, Hibernia ran onshore at Margate as she was sailing from London to St Thomas's. She was got off with little or no damage and the next day sailed from The Downs for Portsmoutyh.

On 4 December, Hibernia was "all well" at 45°23′N 10°53′W.

=== Action with a privateer ===
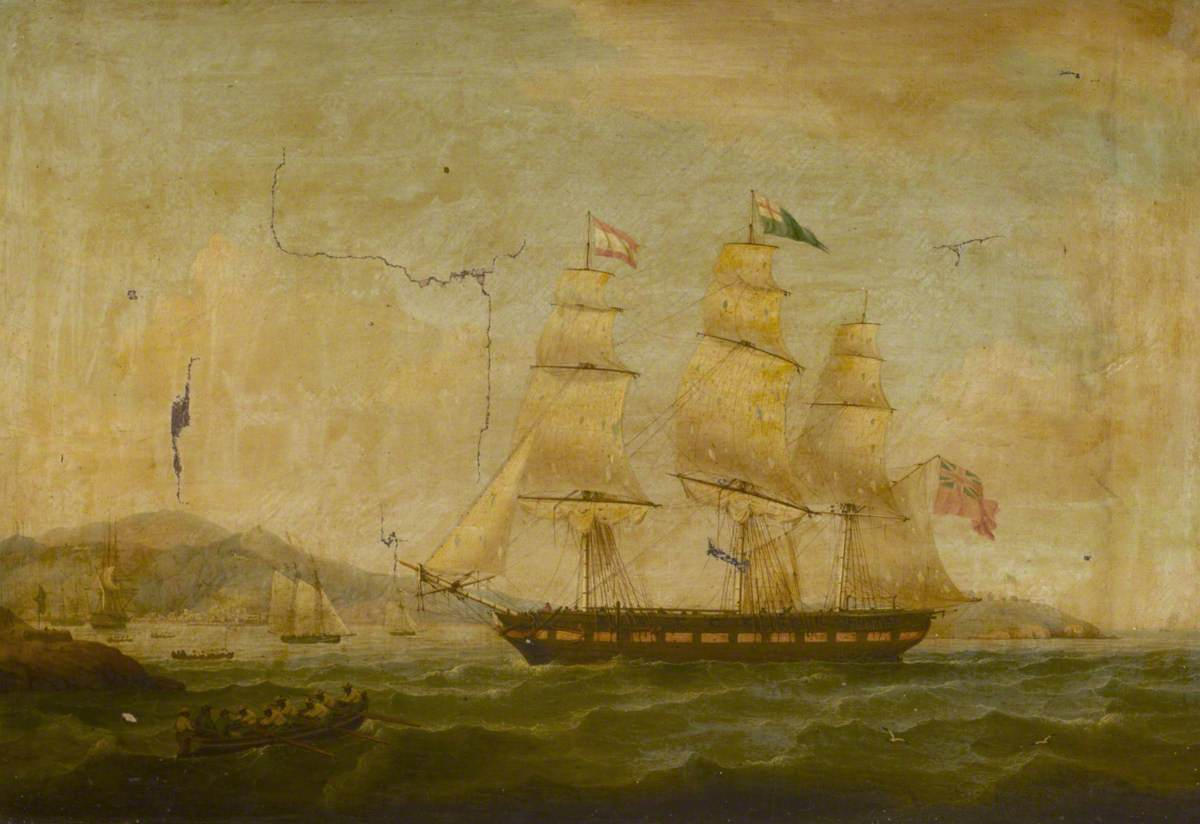
Hibernia Beating off the Privateer Comet, 10 January 1814: Returning to Port; Thomas Whitcombe, National Maritime Museum

On 11 January 1814, Hibernia, of 22 men and six guns, Lennon, master, encountered the American privateer Comet, of 14 guns and 125 men, Thomas Boyle, master. Two days before Comet had encountered the British merchantman Wasp west of Saba, but had sailed away when Wasp gave chase, fearing that Wasp was a warship. This time, an engagement ensued.

After an intense 9-hour single-ship action that left one man killed on Hibernia, and 11 wounded (who were expected to recover), Hibernia succeeded in driving Comet off. Comet had three men killed and eight men wounded. One first-hand American account reported that Comet had six dead and 16 wounded, and that Hibernia had sailed off first. Comet retired to Puerto Rico to refit. Hibernia arrived at St Thomas's that same day. Another report in an American newspaper described Hibernia as being of 800 tons burthen, and gave her casualties as eight killed and 13 wounded. It gave the total of casualties aboard Comet as three killed and 16 wounded.

Two lawsuits with the underwriters of Hibernia's cargo followed. Lennon and his owners were liable for £8,000 in damages, or more than double the loss that would have been incurred if Lennon had surrendered.

=== Convict transport ===
Hibernia departed Portsmouth on 20 November 1818. Adverse winds in the Channel and again off the coast of Australia delayed her voyage with the result that she arrived in Hobart on 11 May 1819, after a transit of 172 days. She had embarked 160 male prisoners, of whom three died on the way. Hibernia continued on to Sydney in June with cabin passengers. Hibernia departed Sydney bound for Calcutta via Batavia.

Two incidents had marred the voyage to Australia. On 8 January 1819, two seamen behaved in a mutinous manner. The rest of the crew objected to the men being put in irons, but eventually all but two others returned to their duties. When Hibernia reached Rio de Janeiro, Lennon asked Captain Robert Wauchope, of HMS Eurydice for assistance. Eventually 12 men from Hibernia joined Eurydice's crew; Wauchope sent only three men in return. The resulting crew shortage on Hibernia delayed her sailing.

On her voyage to Hobart Hibernia's surgeon was Charles Carter, who had a deep-seated antipathy towards clergymen. Unfortunately for Carter, Hibernia carried Rev. Richard Hill. Hill complained that Carter had prohibited Hill from visiting prisoners in the hospital quarters, and had ridiculed Hill's efforts at moral instruction. Carter countered that visits from clergymen depressed the sick. Eventually, Carter's inability to exercise tact when dealing with the clergy led to his dismissal from the convict service.

=== Later career ===
On 5 April 1825, Hibernia, Captain Robert Gillies, arrived at Sydney from England. She was carrying stores for the government. She left Plymouth on 8 November 1823, and came out via the Cape of Good Hope, which she left on 1 February 1824. She also stopped at Hobart Town, leaving there for Sydney on 24 February.

In May 1825, Hibernia got on shore on the Hooghly River and had to put back to port to be docked.

The table below is from Lloyd's Register (LR). The data in the Register was only as accurate as owners chose to keep it updated.

Year	Master	Owner	Trade
1820	J. Lennon	Capt. & Co.	London-India
1822	J. Lennon; M'Intosch	Capt. & Co.	London-India
1823	M'Intosh; J. Lennon	Capt. & Co.	London-India
1824	Gilles (or Gillies)	Capt & Co	Liverpool-New South Wales
1828	Rogers	G. Joad	London-Jamaica
1830	A. Rogers	G. Joad	Plymouth-Jamaica
1831	A.Rogers; Sadler	G. Joad	Plymouth-Jamaica
1832	Sadler	G. Joad	London-Jamaica
1833 - not listed			
1834	J. Cooking		London homeport
1835 (Note: The entry in Lloyd's Register describes Hibernia as being of 432 tons (bm), and launched in 1811 at Cowes.)	J.Cooking; Gillies	Jacob & Son.	London-Calcutta
1838 (Note: The entry in Lloyd's Register describes Hibernia as being of 422 tons (bm), and launched in 1811 at Cowes. It also gives her homeport as Scarborough.)	Fowler	Willis & Co.	London-Quebec
