= Wasp (1809 ship) =

British ship

History

United Kingdom
- Name: Wasp
- Namesake: Wasp
- Builder: Hull
- Launched: 1809

General characteristics
- Tons burthen: Originally:267; (bm); Post-1812: 319, or 31965/94 (bm)
- Propulsion: Sails
- Sail plan: Brig
- Complement: 36; 1817:18
- Armament: 1809:12 × 12-pounder carronades; 1814:12 × 12-pounder guns of the new construction; 1817: 4 guns

Wasp was a British ship. It launched at Hull in 1809. She traded as a West Indiaman and in 1812 she was lengthened, which increased her burthen to 319 tons. This does not appear in the issues of Lloyd's Register that are the basis for the table below, but does appear in a different volume of a Register of Shipping. After the commencement of the War of 1812 she sailed under a letter of marque that too recorded her burthen as 319 tons.

- Letter of marque: Edward Archer
- Letter of marque: John Crabtree

Wasp and Crabtree arrived at St Thomas on 10 January 1814. Crabtree reported that the day before he had encountered an American privateer west of Saba but that it had sailed away when he gave chase, fearing that Wasp was a warship. On 11 January, the British merchantman Hibernia, of 22 men and six guns, Lennon, master, too encountered the privateer. The privateer was Comet, of 14 guns and 125 men, Boyle, master. After an intense 9-hour single-ship action that left one man killed on Hibernia, and 11 wounded, Hibernia succeeded in driving Comet off. Comet had three men killed and eight men wounded.

On 12 October 1817, Wasp, John Ware, master, and Thomas Staniforth and Thomas Blunt, owners, received a license at Gibraltar from the British East India Company. The license authorized Wasp to trade with India. Then on 29 December 1818 they received a license again, but this time at Malta. Each license only cost £5. Wasp left Calcutta on 5 April 1818, bound for Gibraltar and Malta.

In 1820, Wasp changed owners and thereafter made one voyage as a whaler. The outcome and duration are currently obscure. Wasp is no longer listed after 1827.

The data in the table below are from Lloyd's Register. The information is only as accurate as owners bothered to keep it updated.

Year	Master	Owner	Trade	Notes
1809	J.Shepherd	Staniforth	Hull-London	12 × 12-pounder carronades
1810	Grieson	Staniforth	London-Haiti	12 × 12-pounder carronades
1811	Grieson; E.Archer	Staniforth	London-Haiti; London Santo Domingo	12 × 12-pounder carronades
1812	E. Archer	Staniforth	London-Santo Domingo; London-Malta	12 × 12-pounder carronades
1813	E. Archer; Crabtree	Staniforth	London	12 × 12-pounder carronades
1814	Crabtree; Dalziel	Staniforth	London; London-Jamaica	12 × 12-pounder guns of the new construction
1815	Dalzeil; J. Ware	Staniforth	London-Jamaica	12 × 12-pounder guns of the new construction
1816	J. Ware	Staniforth	Plymouth-West Indies	
1818	J. Ware	Staniforth	London	
1819	J. Ware	Staniforth	London	
1820	J. Ware; Harris	Staniforth; Birnie	London-South Seas Fishery	
1821	E. Harris	Birnie (or Burnie)	London-South Seas Fishery	
1822	Harris	Birnie	London-South Seas Fishery	
1823	Harris	Birnie	London-South Seas Fishery	
1824	Harris	Birnie	London-South Seas Fishery	
1825	Harris	Birnie	London-South Seas Fishery	
1826	Harris	Birnie	London-South Seas Fishery	
1827	Harris	Birnie	London-South Seas Fishery	
