= John Lennon (naval officer) =

John Lennon (1768–1846), was a naval captain, born at Downpatrick, Ireland in 1768. He is stated to have served as a midshipman in the British Royal Navy during the American Revolution. In 1796, when in command of the letter of marque schooner Favorite, of Martinique, he was very severely wounded and his ship was taken by a French privateer of very superior force after a fierce engagement of one hour and twenty minutes' duration.

In 1798 he was in command of the General Keppel, also of Martinique, which was capsized in a white squall on passage from Philadelphia, when Lennon and some of his crew were rescued by a passing schooner, after suffering great perils and hardships. Lennon performed various daring feats in the West Indies in 1806–9; but his most remarkable exploits were in Hibernia, a Cowes-built barque, carrying six guns and about twenty-two men and boys all told, in which he traded for some years from the West India island of St. Thomas. In 1812 orders were issued that no vessels should leave the island without convoy, on account of the American privateers. The Hibernia and three other merchantmen, whose aggregate cargoes were valued at half a million sterling, had long been waiting. Unwilling to detain them further, Governor Maclean agreed to their sailing without convoy, on condition of Lennon hoisting his pennant as commodore. Although harassed by Rossie, Commodore Joshua Barney, an American privateer of superior force, Lennon brought his vessels safe into the English Channel on 18 October 1812.

Two years later Lennon was attacked, on 19 July 1814, by the schooner Comet of Baltimore, U.S., an American privateer of sixteen guns and 136 men, which he beat off after a nine-hour fight, in which twelve out of his crew of twenty-two hands were killed or wounded. Two lawsuits followed with the underwriters of the Hibernia's cargo, and Lennon and his owners were liable for £8,000 in damages, or more than double the loss that would have been incurred if Lennon had surrendered.

In 1818–19, Lennon and Hibernia transported convicts to Van Diemen's Land.

Lennon and his wife Mary had two daughters. He died in retirement at his home, in Plymouth, England, on 27 August 1846 from complications (a bronchial infection) resulting from a wound he received in 1796.

== Sources ==
- This article incorporates text from a publication now in the public domain: Chichester, H. M. (1893). "Lennon, John". In Lee, Sidney (ed.). Dictionary of National Biography. Vol. 33. London: Smith, Elder & Co. pp. 46, 47. The article cites the following: Nav. and Mil. Gazettes, 24 July, 7 Aug., 21 Aug., and 18 Sept. 1841, by David Burn. See Burn's Chivalry of the Merchant Marine, London, 1841, and Brenton's Naval Hist. vol. ii.
