= Comet (1810 schooner) =

American schooner

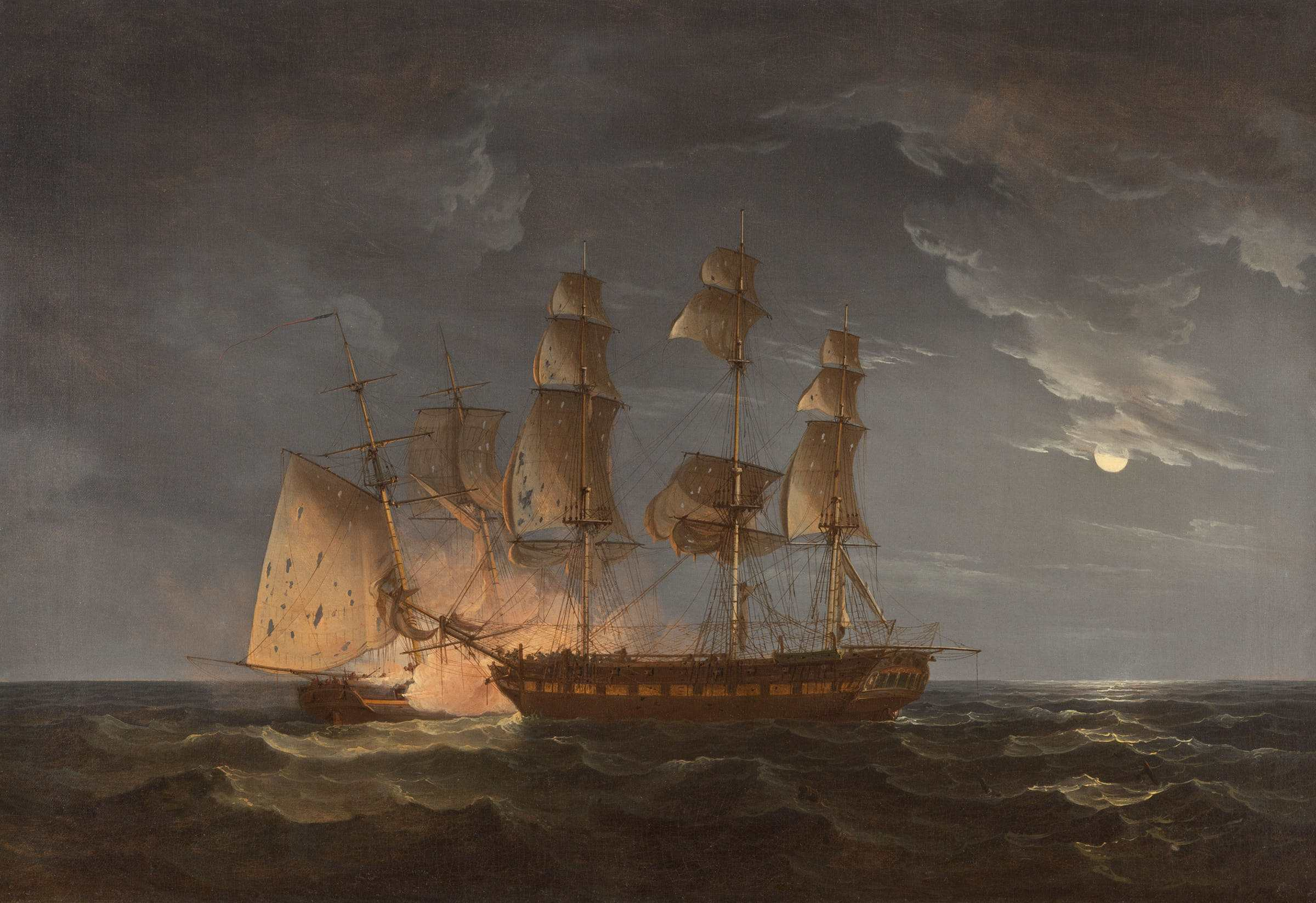
- Hibernia engaging Comet, 1814

History

United States
- Name: Comet
- Owner: William Furlong and Thorndike Chase
- Builder: Thomas Kemp
- Completed: 1810
- Acquired: 1812
- In service: 29 June 1812

General characteristics
- Type: Schooner
- Tonnage: 187
- Length: 90 ft 6 in (27.58 m); 68 ft 0 in (20.73 m) (keel)
- Beam: 23 ft 6 in (7.16 m)
- Depth of hold: 10 ft 0 in (3.05 m)
- Sail plan: Schooner-rigged
- Complement: 120
- Armament: 2 × 9-pounder guns + 10 × 12-pounder carronades in 1810; 2 × 9-pounder guns + 12 × 12-pounder carronades in 1812

Comet, an American schooner, was built in 1810 at Baltimore, Maryland. She was owned by "a group of wealthy Baltimore investors." Under Captain Thomas Boyle, who was a part owner of the schooner, Comet sailed from July 1812 to March 1814 as a privateer, which was a type of ships licensed by the United States during the War of 1812 to harass the British merchant vessels and divest their cargoes.

== Construction ==
Comet was built by Thomas Kemp of Baltimore, Maryland for Captain William Furlong, who made a series of payments of $1,505. Captain Thorndike Chase paid the rest of the total cost of $3,630 in 1810, bringing his share in the schooner to a little more than half.

== Career ==
=== First and Second Cruises ===
Comet started her career as a privateer on 12 July 1812 under the command of Thomas Boyle. At first she harassed many British vessels in the Caribbean Sea. Just two weeks into her cruise as a privateer, on 26 July 1812, she took her first prize.

Her second voyage was off the coast of South America. The cruise was less successful as the prize ships she was able to capture were all retaken by the British before able to reach the United States. Comet went back into the home port of Baltimore through fog at the mouth of the Chesapeake Bay, successfully running the British blockade on 17 March 1813.

=== Charter of U.S. Navy ===
Between April and September 1813, Comet, together with three other Baltimore privateers, Revenge, Patapsco and Wasp, was chartered by the U.S. Navy for reconnaissance in the Chesapeake Bay area, with Thomas Boyle remaining in command as a sailing Master of Comet. By the end of August, all four were released from patrol duty and Comet again put to sea on 29 October 1813, returning to Beaufort, North Carolina.

=== Third Cruise and Engagement with Hibernia ===
Boyle took the Comet on a third privateering cruise, which lasted until March 1814.

On 11 January 1814, Comet encountered Hibernia, who carried 22 men and six guns on board. Two days before Comet had encountered the British merchantman Wasp west of Saba, but had sailed away when Wasp gave chase, fearing that Wasp was a warship. This time Captain Boyle was ready to take his prize. After an intense 9-hour single-ship action Hibernia succeeded in driving Comet off and left the field. Comet had three men killed and sixteen wounded. The reports of the wounded and killed on Hibernia vary greatly, depending on the side reporting the numbers. A British source reports one dead and 11 wounded, as one American book lists that eight men were killed and 13 were wounded. (The former probably is more reliable in its reporting.) As to the schooner, Comet was completely demasted and had 28 wounds in her hall with water pouring in. After overnight jury rigging, she retired to Puerto Rico and stayed there for a three-week refit. Hibernia arrived at St Thomas's that same day. Comet wasn't fit for further duties as a privateer and Boyle took a command of another famous Baltimore privateer, Chasseur.

The 1812-1814 cruises were documented by a crew member and a relative of Thomas Boyle in a book.

=== Later career ===
Little is known of Comet's career after her years as a privateer.

On 12 May 1814 she was sold at Charleston, South Carolina, to New York owners. Another account report that she was purchased in 1815 by Thomas Boyle, owning 50% of the schooner, and the rest was owned by another two crew members of the 1812-1814 cruise.

== List of the prizes, War of 1812 ==
Comet took 35 prizes as a privateer. The list is:

- Adelphi, Scottish ship, 361 tons, mounting eight long twelve-pounders, captured off the coast of Pernambuco in January 1813, laden with salt and dry-goods. Adelphi foundered on the way to Surinam; her master and crew were saved and reached there.
- Alexis, brig, of Greenock, carrying sugar, rum, cotton and coffee from Demerara, mounting ten guns, captured on 6 February 1813; later retaken by HMS Lightning.
- Bowes, brig, retaken by HMS Opossum and taken into St Vincents on 6 February 1813.
- Dominica Packet, brig, of Liverpool, from Demerara bound for St. Thomas with rum, sugar, cotton and coffee, mounting ten guns, captured on 6 March 1813; later retaken by HMS Variable.
- Endeavor, sloop, destroyed (Cmp)
- Enterprise, brig, ransomed
- Enterprise, schooner, sunk
- General Spooner, sloop, retaken
- General Wale, sloop, retaken
- Hannah, brig, ransomed
- Henry, new ship, captured on 26 July 1812 after a 15-minute fight, carried sugar and old Madeira wine from St Croix to London, Valued at $150,000-170,00, sent to Baltimore.
- Hopewell, ship, 400 tons, was captured in July 1812 on her way to London from Surinam, carrying sugar, molasses, cotton, coffee and cocoa, one of her men was killed, the ship and the cargo was valued at $150,000, sent to Baltimore.
- Industry, schooner, sent in (US)
- Industry, brig, was captured on her way to London from Suriname, carrying sugar, cotton, and coffee, sent to Wilmington, North Carolina.
- Industry, sloop, burnt
- Jackman, schooner, cartel
- Jane, schooner, retaken
- John, ship, 400 tons, captured on her passage from Demerara to Liverpool on 18 September 1812, the prize was valued at $150,000-200,000 and sent to Baltimore.
- Little Cherub, sloop, given up
- Mary, sloop, foundered
- Messenger, schooner, sent to Wilmington, North Carolina.
- St. John, schooner, ransomed
- Venus, schooner, sent in
- Vigilant, schooner tender, sent to Wilmington, North Carolina.
- vessel, Puerto Rico
- 9 more vessels, destroyed

== Paintings ==
Only one painting of Comet is available, which is an 1814 painting by Thomas Whitcombe, 12 at Midnight; the Hibernia Attempting to run the Comet at the Smithsonian National Portrait Gallery.
