= Intrepid (1787 ship) =

Ship launched in 1776

History

Great Britain
- Name: Intrepid
- Builder: The Thames
- Launched: 1776
- Fate: Wrecked November 1816

General characteristics
- Tons burthen: 340, or 366, or 383 (bm)
- Complement: 1799:30; 1801:50; 1804:55
- Armament: 1793: 6 × 4-pounder guns; 1799: 18 × 9-pounder guns; 1801: 20 × 9&18-pounder cannons; 1804: 22 × 9–pounder + 2 × 6-pounder guns

Intrepid was launched in 1776, almost surely under another name. She appeared as Intrepid in British records from 1787; missing volumes of Lloyd's Register (LR) and missing pages in extant records obscure her earlier name(s) and history. She made one voyage as a whaler in the British southern whale fishery and two as a Liverpool-based slave ship in the triangular trade in enslaved people. She also captured a Spanish merchant ship in a notable action. Otherwise she traded widely as a West Indiaman, transport, and to North and South America. She was wrecked in November 1816.

== Career ==
Intrepid first appeared in LR in 1790. However she appeared as Intrepid in British records from 1787 on.

Whaling voyage (1787–1788): Captain John Leard (or Laird) sailed from London on 19 July 1787, bound for the southern fishery. He returned on 27 June 1788, with 56 tuns of whale oil and 14600 seal skins.

Missing volumes and missing pages in extant on-line volumes of LR obscure Intrepid's transition from whaling back to trading.

Year	Master	Owner	Trade	Source & notes
1790	M.L.Royal	J.Hall	London–St Vincent	LR; rebuilt 1786
1792	M.L.Royal; J.M'Kenzie	J.Hall	London–St Vincent	LR; rebuilt 1786
1793	J.M'Kenzie; Atkinson	J.Hall	London–St Vincent; Cork–Petersburg	LR; rebuilt 1786
1796	Atkinson; W.Murray	J.Hall	Cork transport London–Martinique	LR; rebuilt 1786
1797	W.Murray	M'burney	London–Martinique	LR; rebuilt 1786, repairs 1796
1798	Robbins	J.Gibbons	Liverpool–Africa	LR; rebuilt 1786, repairs 1796 & 1797

1st voyage transporting enslaved people (1797–1799): Captain Francis Robinson acquired a letter of marque on 16 November 1797. He sailed from Liverpool on 23 December, bound for the Bight of Benin. In 1797, 140 vessels sailed from English ports to participate in the triangular trade; 90 of these vessels sailed from Liverpool.

Robinson acquired captives at Lagos, and then elsewhere in the Bight. Intrepid arrived at Grenada on 3 January 1799, with 235 captives. She arrived back at Liverpool on 14 June. She had left Liverpool with 47 crew members and suffered seven crew deaths on the voyage. At some point Captain James Leavy replaced Robinson. Intrepid returned to Liverpool from Tobago, via Milford, under the command of Captain Thomas Kidney.

Year	Master	Owner	Trade	Source & notes
1801	Robinson; J.Pettigrew	J.Gibbons	Liverpool–Africa; Liverpool–Jamaica	LR; rebuilt 1786, repairs 1796 & 1797, and almost rebuilt 1800

Captain John Pettigrew acquired a letter of marque on 11 May 1801. On 22 June, he was on his way to Jamaica in company with Dominica Packet, Ferguson, master, and Alfred, Forster, master, when they encountered the Spanish ship Galgo at 10°25′N 40°18′W. After a running fight of two hours, Galgo struck. She was armed with twenty-four 6-pounder guns and had a crew of 78 men under the command of Franscisco de Pascadello. The only British casualty was one man killed aboard Intrepid. Galgo was last from Rio de la Plata and on her way to Cadiz with a cargo of hides, cocoa, indigo, and bar copper. The three British ships and their prize arrived at Barbados on 9 July. Lloyd's List described Galgo as having a burthen of 600 tons.

Year	Master	Owner	Trade	Source & notes
1802	J.Pettigrew; R.Caitcheon	Masden & Co. J.Wardle	Liverpool–Jamaica	LR; rebuilt 1786, repairs 1796 & 1797, and almost rebuilt 1800
1804	Critcheon; J.Campbell	J.Wardell	Liverpool–Jamaica	LR; rebuilt 1786, repairs 1796 & 1797, and almost rebuilt 1800

2nd voyage transporting enslaved people (1804–1805): Captain John Campbell acquired a letter of marque on 2 April 1804. He sailed from Liverpool on 4 June. In 1804, 147 vessels sailed from English ports to participate in the triangular trade; 126 of these vessels sailed from Liverpool.

Intrepid acquired captives at Calabar. She arrived at Suriname on 3 April 1805, with 312 captives. She left for home on 20 September, and arrived back at Liverpool on 20 November. She had left Liverpool with 67 crew members and she suffered 17 crew deaths on her voyage.

Year	Master	Owner	Trade	Source & notes
1806	J.Campbell; Trumbell	H.Clark; Gladstones	Liverpool–Africa	LR; rebuilt 1786, repairs 1796 & 1797, and almost rebuilt 1800
1808	Trumbell	Gladstones	Liverpool–Berbice	LR; rebuilt 1786, repairs 1796 & 1797, and almost rebuilt 1800

Intrepid, Turnbull, master, was on her way from Demerara to Liverpool when she had to put into Antigua leaky. The next report, from Antigua, was that it was expected that she would be able to proceed on her voyage. A third report stated that Intrepid had had to unload to effect repairs but that she was reloading and was expected to sail with the next convoy. She arrived at Liverpool on 18 June.

Year	Master	Owner	Trade	Source & notes
1809	Hevison; Finlay	Gladstones	Liverpool–Cadiz	LR; almost rebuilt 1800 & large repair 1808
1813	W.Finlay; G.East	Gladstones	Liverpool–Gibraltar	LR; almost rebuilt 1800, large repair 1808, repairs 1812
1814	G.Best; Cummins	Gladstones	Liverpool–Smyrna	LR; almost rebuilt 1800, large repair 1808, repairs 1812
1816	Cummins; J.Stroyan	Gladstones	Liverpool–Brazils	LR; almost rebuilt 1800, large repair 1808, repairs 1812
1816	W.Findlay; Stranhom	Gladstones	Liverpool–Smyrna; Liverpool–Newfoundland	Register; of Shipping; rebuilt 1809, new sides and repair 1812

== Fate ==
Intrepid, Stroyan, master, arrived at St. John's, Newfoundland on 22 June 1816. She then sailed to Miramichi.

Intrepid ran aground on 16 November on the Hoyle Sandbank, in Liverpool Bay. She was later refloated and taken in to Bootle Bay.

Intrepid then disappeared from the registers and from the ship arrival and departure data in Lloyd's List.
