= Turtledove Cay =

Islet of the United States Virgin Islands

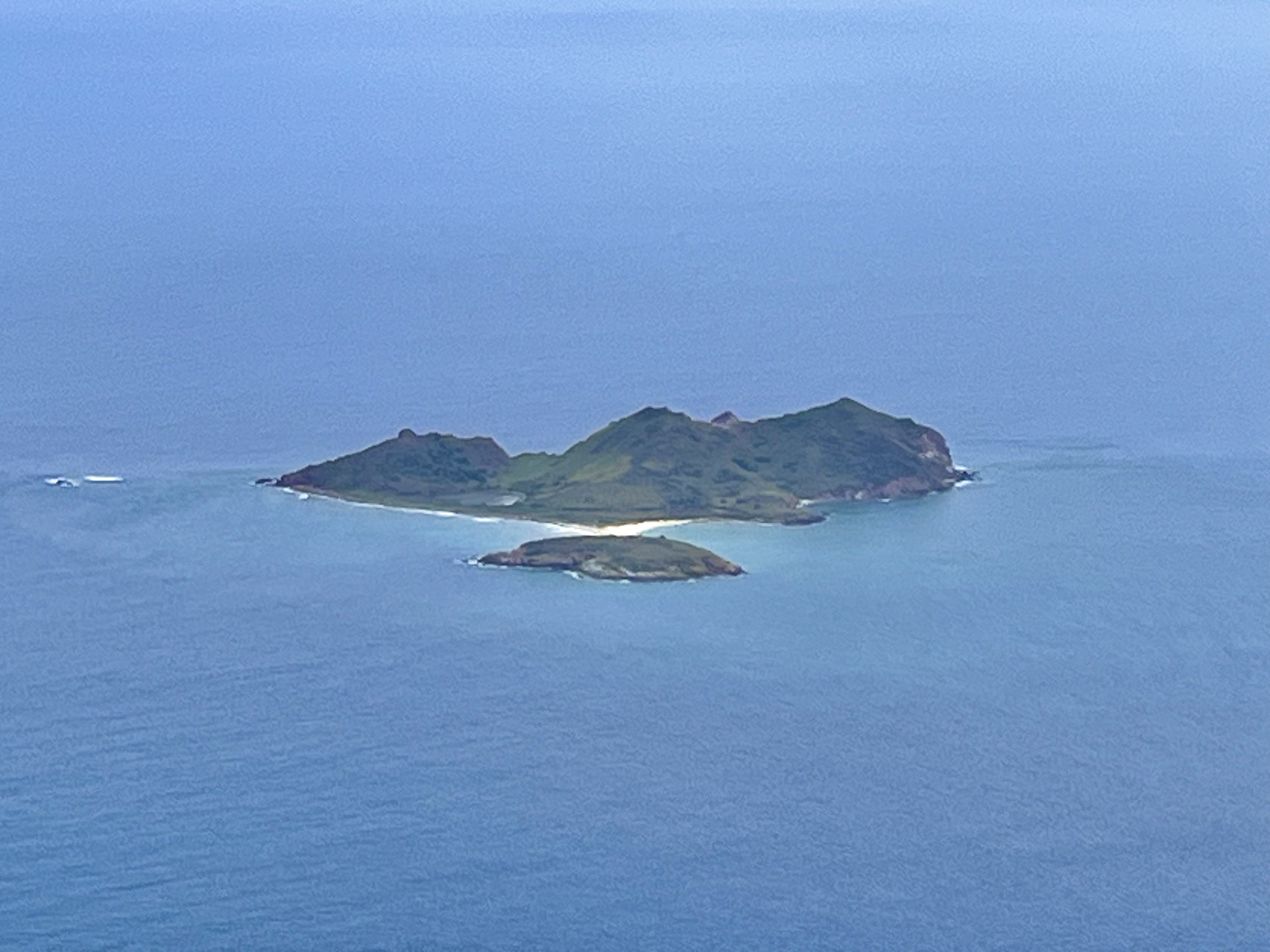
- Saba Island (back) and Turtledove Cay (front)

- Location in the Caribbean Turtledove Cay (the Caribbean)

Geography
- Location: Caribbean Sea
- Coordinates: 18°18′31″N 65°00′01″W

Administration
- United States
- Insular area: United States Virgin Islands

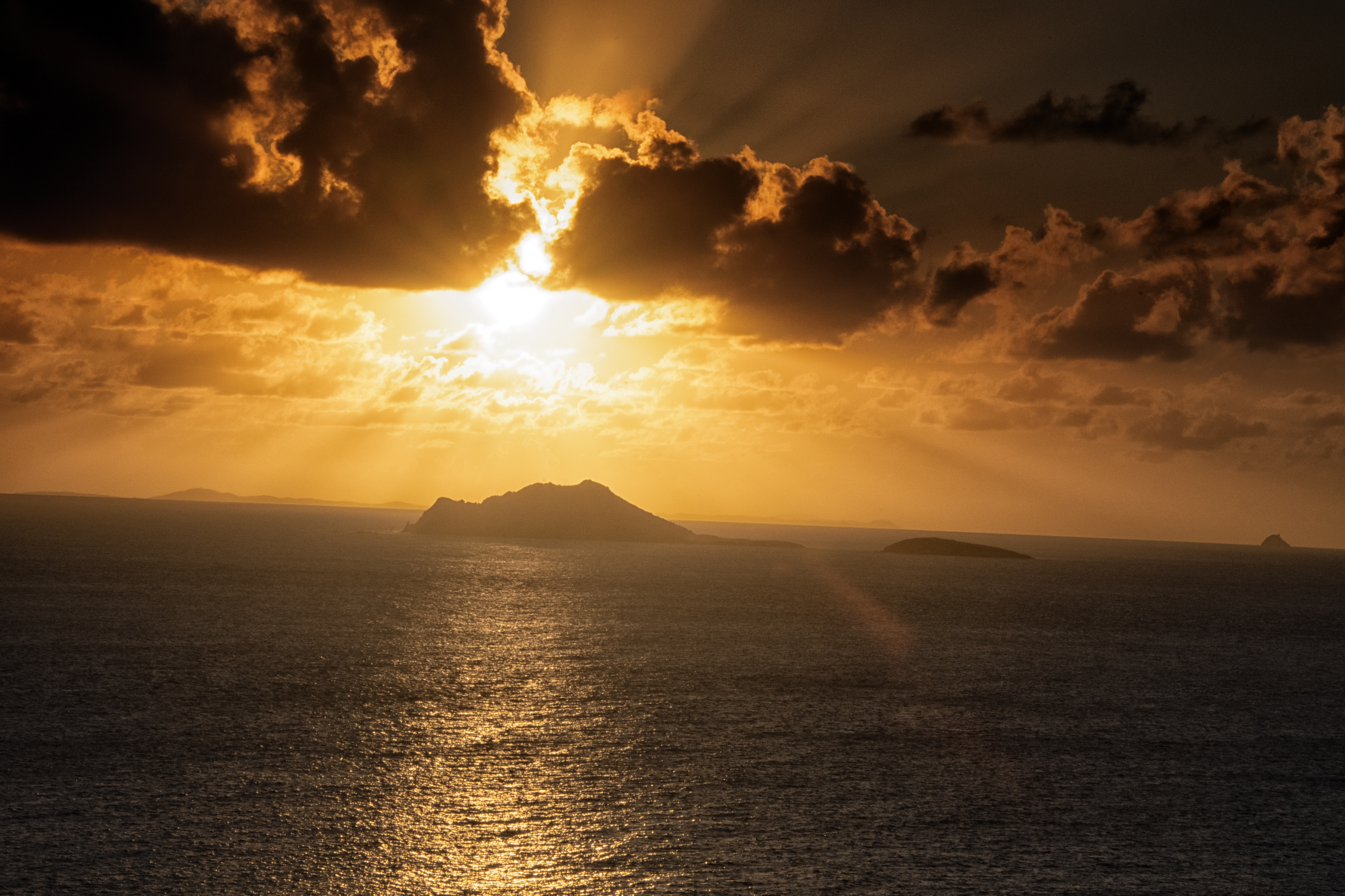
Saba Island and Turtledove Cay at sunset

Turtledove Cay (also known as Turtledove Key, Dove Key and Turtle Dove Cay) is a rocky 3.78 acre islet, located 100 yards north of Saba Island in the United States Virgin Islands. Its elevation is 50 feet and the islet is covered with tall grass. It is joined with Saba Island by a reef, which is bare at times of extremely low water. Turtledove Cay (and nearby Flat Cay, Little Flat Cay and Saba Island) are all designated wildlife reserves by the territorial U.S.V.I. government. Turtledove Cay is home to large quantities of native avifauna, including large colonies of noddies and other seabirds.
