= HMS Vengeur (1810) =

Vengeur-class ship of the line

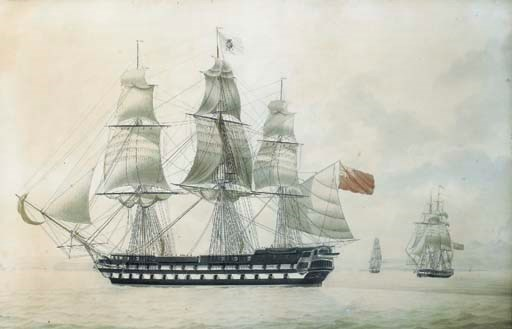
- Vengeur in Naples Bay with the Neapolitan flag at her main masthead, 1820, by Nicolas S. Cammillieri

History

United Kingdom
- Name: Vengeur
- Ordered: 20 October 1806
- Builder: Joseph Graham, Harwich
- Laid down: July 1807
- Launched: 19 June 1810
- Commissioned: September 1810
- Fate: Broken up, 1843

General characteristics (as built)
- Class & type: Vengeur-class ship of the line
- Tons burthen: 1,764 62/94 (bm)
- Length: 176 ft 5 in (53.8 m) (gundeck)
- Beam: 47 ft 9 in (14.6 m)
- Draught: 17 ft 9 in (5.4 m) (light)
- Depth of hold: 21 ft 1 in (6.4 m)
- Sail plan: Full-rigged ship
- Complement: 590
- Armament: 74 muzzle-loading, smoothbore guns; Gundeck: 28 × 32 pdr guns; Upper deck: 28 × 18 pdr guns; Quarterdeck: 4 × 12 pdr guns + 10 × 32 pdr carronades; Forecastle: 2 × 12 pdr guns + 2 × 32 pdr carronades

Plan drawing for the Vengeur

HMS Vengeur was a 74-gun third rate Vengeur-class ship of the line built for the Royal Navy in the first decade of the 19th century. Completed in 1810, she played a minor role in the Napoleonic Wars. launched on 19 June 1810 at Harwich.

== Service ==
On 30 August 1810, Captain Thomas Brown took command of Vengeur, the flagship of Admiral Sir Joseph Sidney Yorke. Brown escorted to Portugal a large body of troops sent as reinforcements to the Duke of Wellington's army there. Vengeur then cruised the Western Isles to protect an inbound fleet of East Indiamen.

Brown's replacement in November 1811 was Captain James Brisbane. Robert Tristram Ricketts took command of Vengeur in October 1813.

Vengeur, Lightning, and Madagascar were in company on 6 March 1814 at the recapture of the Diamond. (Note: A first-class share for Diamond was worth £59 3s 3½d; a sixth-class share was worth 10s 3¾d.)

In May 1814, the 9th Regiment of Foot marched from Bayonne to Bordeaux and embarked on York and Vengeur to sail to Quebec to lend support to the British Army in the fight against the Americans during the War of 1812.

Vengeur then joined Vice Admiral Alexander Cochrane's fleet moored off New Orleans on New Year's Day, having escorted troopships carrying the battalions of the 7th Regiment of Foot and 43rd Regiment of Foot. The Commanding Officer of the Vengeur's Marine detachment, Brevet Major Thomas Adair, was made a Companion of the Order of the Bath for leading a party of 100 Royal Marines on a successful assault on the right bank of the Mississippi River. Although the strongpoint was taken, and seventeen cannons were captured, the battle was lost as the left bank remained impregnable. Of the two fatalities among the Royal Marines, one was from HMS Vengeur.

Ricketts commanded the British naval forces at the Second Battle of Fort Bowyer, the British attack on the American fort at Mobile Point in 1815. The British then attacked and captured Fort Bowyer at the mouth of Mobile Bay on 12 February. The British were making preparations to attack Mobile when news of the peace treaty arrived. The British Parliament had ratified the Treaty of Ghent, but Congress and the President would approve it in mid-February. Tonnant left the anchorage off Mobile Bay on 18 February and arrived in Havana on 24 February 1815, accompanied by Asia and Vengeur.

Captain Thomas Alexander took command in August 1815. Vengeur served as a guardship at Portsmouth from June 1816 to May 1818. From October to December, she was fitted out for sea.

Frederick Lewis Maitland took command of Vengeur in October 1818 and in 1819 sailed her to South America. He took Lord George Beresford from Rio de Janeiro to Lisbon in 1820 and then returned to the Mediterranean. He then carried Ferdinand I, King of the Two Sicilies, from Naples to Livorno on his way to attend the Congress of Laibach (modern Ljubljana). The passage was rough and lasted seven days, but they arrived safely on 20 December. After His Majesty landed, he invested Maitland with the insignia of a knight-commander of the order of St. Ferdinand and Merit. He gave him a gold box with the king's portrait set in diamonds. Maitland and Vengeur then returned to England, arriving at Spithead on 29 March 1821. Vengeur was found to be defective and was paid off on 18 May 1821 at Sheerness.

== Fate ==
She was fitted as a receiving ship between July 1823 and February 1824. She then went to Shearness, where she served as a receiving ship until 1838. She was broken up in 1843.
