= HMS Madagascar (1811) =

Frigate of the Royal Navy

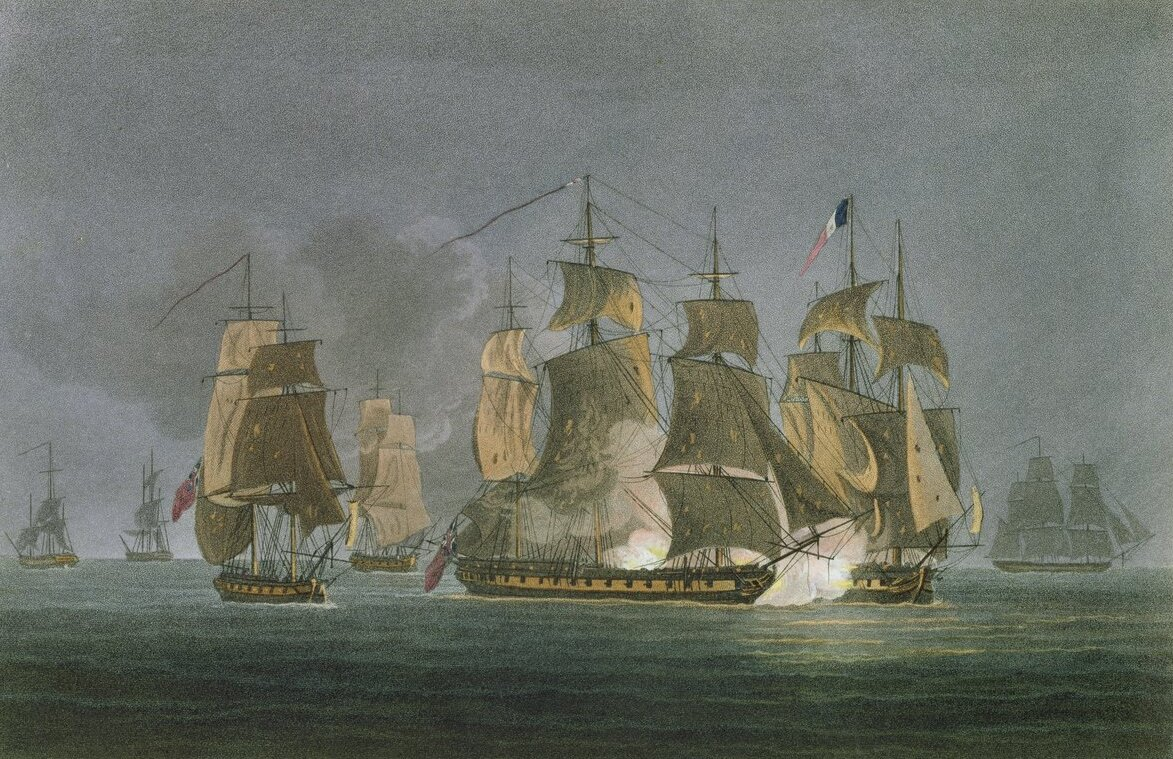
- Néréide at the Battle of Tamatave

History

France
- Name: Néréide
- Namesake: Nereid
- Ordered: 28 December 1805
- Builder: Saint Malo
- Laid down: March 1806
- Launched: 18 April 1809
- Captured: 26 May 1811

United Kingdom
- Name: HMS Madagascar
- Acquired: 26 May 1811
- Fate: Broken up 1819

General characteristics
- Displacement: 1,400 tons (French)
- Tons burthen: 1,113 90/94 (bm)
- Propulsion: Sail
- Complement: 330–340
- Armament: French service; UD: 28 × 18-pounder guns; Spardeck: 8 × 8-pounder guns + 8 × 36-pounder carronades

HMS Madagascar was a 38-gun Piémontaise-class frigate originally of the French Navy. Her French name had been Néréide, and she had been built to a design by François Pestel.

In 1810 as Néréide, she sailed to Guadeloupe but was repelled by the blockade off Basse-Terre, and returned to Brest after a fight with HMS Rainbow and HMS Avon.

The British captured Néréide during the action of 20 May 1811, and commissioned her into the Royal Navy as HMS Madagascar.

She took part in the Peninsular War against France, and the War of 1812 with the United States.

Madagascar, Vengeur, and Lightning were in company on 6 March 1814 at the recapture of Diamond. (Note: A first-class share for Diamond was worth £59 3s 3 1/2d; a sixth-class share was worth 10s 3 3/4d.) Shortly thereafter, Captain Bentinck Cavendish Doyle of Lightning transferred to take command of Madagascar.

In June 1814, Madagascar served in a flotilla under the command of Admiral Lord Cochrane, and carried General William Miller and his troops from Bordeaux to the Chesapeake Bay to reinforce General Ross in the War of 1812.^{1}She returned to Portsmouth on 2 August 1815.
