= Bowes (1808 ship) =

History

United Kingdom
- Name: Bowes
- Builder: Workington
- Launched: 1808
- Fate: Last listed 1863

General characteristics
- Tons burthen: Old Act: 265 (bm); New Act (post 1836):250 (bm)
- Armament: 12 × 6&9-pounder guns (1815)

Bowes was launched in 1808 at Workington. In 1813 an American privateer captured her but the British Royal Navy quickly recaptured her. She traded with the Caribbean, South America, the Black Sea, and across the North Atlantic. She was last listed in 1863.

== Career ==
Bowes first appeared in Lloyd's Register (LR) in 1808 with J.Bowman, master, W.Fell, owner, and trade Workington–West Indies.

Year	Master	Owner	Trade	Source & notes
1810	S.Dixon	J.Hornby	Liverpool–Brazils	LR; good repair 1811

Capture and recapture: The American privateer Comet captured Bowes, Dixon, master, in early 1813. HMS Opossum recaptured Bowes and took her into St Vincents on 6 February 1813.

In 1815 Bowes rescued the crew of Adventure. Adventure had sprung a leak and was scuttled by her crew around 29 March in the Atlantic Ocean whilst on a voyage from Jamaica to Liverpool. Bowes took the crew into Liverpool.

Year	Master	Owner	Trade	Source & notes
1815	J.Hornby; D.Douglas	W.Fell	Liverpool–Trinidad	LR; good repair 1811
1820	Douglas	Boyle & Co.	Liverpool–Trinidad	LR; good repair 1811
1825	Collins	J.Harding	London–Odessa	LR; good repair 1811

Lloyd's List reported that a letter from Constantinople dated 10 December 1823 stated that Bowes, Collins, master, had passed through the Bosphorus without a firman (written permission) and was now loading for Odessa.

Year	Master	Owner	Trade	Source & notes
1830	H.Fawcett	Holliday & Co.	Dublin	LR; good repair 1811; small repairs 1827 & 1829
1835	Johnston	Holiday	Workington	LR; large repair 1832
1840	Johnston	Holiday	Workington; Workington–Quebec	LR; large repair 1832, small repairs 1836 & 1838, & damages repaired 1840
1845	Johnston	Halliday	Workington–North America	LR; large repair 1832 & 1845
1850	Ellwood	Halliday	Cardiff–United States	LR; large repair 1832 & 1845

On 13 August 1851 Bowes ran aground in the River Tyne at Hebburn. She was on a voyage from Dalhousie, New Brunswick, British North America to Newcastle upon Tyne

Year	Master	Owner	Trade	Source & notes
1855	Ellgood	Holliday	Workington–North America	LR; large repair 1832 & 1845, and small repair 1845
1860	Ellwood	Holliday	Workington–Newfoundland	LR; large repair 1832 & 1845, small repair 1854 and 1856, and large repair 1858

== Fate ==
Bowes was last listed in 1864 with E.Penrice, master and trade Maryport coaster.
