= HMS Redbridge (1807) =

History

United Kingdom
- Name: HMS Redbridge
- Builder: America
- Launched: 1806
- Acquired: 1807 by capture
- Renamed: HMS Variable in 1808
- Fate: Sold 1814

General characteristics
- Tons burthen: 172 (bm)
- Length: Overall: 80 ft 5 in (24.5 m); Keel: 67 ft 7 in (20.6 m)
- Beam: 21 ft 10 in (6.7 m)
- Depth of hold: 8 ft 0 in (2.4 m)
- Sail plan: Schooner
- Complement: 50
- Armament: 2 × 6-pounder guns + 8 × 12-pounder carronades

HMS Redbridge was the French schooner Aristotle, built in America. The Royal Navy took her into service as HMS Redbridge in 1807 and renamed her HMS Variable in 1808. She was sold in 1814.

== Career ==
Lieutenant Robert Yates commissioned Redbridge in 1808 in Jamaica.

On 26 July 1812 Variable captured Resolution, which was on her way to Havana with a cargo of flour, rice, etc. Then on 20 August Variable captured Trinidad, which too was on her way to Havana, but with a cargo of lumber. On 29 August Variable captured Louisa Antoina, bound to Havan with lumber.

In late 1812 Rhodian, Captain John George Boss, and the schooner Variable captured the American privateer Dash. Dash was armed with one gun and had a crew of 30 men. (Note: Dash, Captain J. Conway, of Norfolk, had earlier captured the schooner HMS Whiting, which had anchored at Hampton Roads, unaware that war had broken out between the United Kingdom and the United States.) Next, Variable and the boats of Rhodian, on 16 September 1812 captured Sarah Ann, of one 12-pounder gun and 44 men.

In late March 1813 Variable recaptured two vessels and captured two more, all of which she sent into Nassau, Bahamas:

- English schooner Mayflower (23 March), laden with flour, from Providence and bound to Providence;
- English brig Dominica Packet (23 March), laden with sugar, coffee, etc., bound to Liverpool. (Note: Dominca Packet's captor was the Baltimore privateer Comet. Dominica Packet arrived at Nassau on 28 March. e)
- Spanish schooner Maria (23 March), laden with flour, bound to Havana from Philadelphia.
- American brig Penobscot (27 March), laden with molasses and sugar, bound to Boston from St. Jago de Cuba.

== Fate ==
Variable was sold in 1814. She was struck from the lists on 23 November.
