= Sarah Ann (1799 ship) =

History

Great Britain
- Name: Sarah Ann
- Builder: Philadelphia
- Launched: 1795
- Captured: Captured and recaptured 1800
- Fate: Last listed 1806

General characteristics
- Tons burthen: 119 (bm)

Sarah Ann (or Sarah & Ann), was a ship launched at Philadelphia in 1795. A French privateer captured her, but she was recaptured and sold. She returned to service and was last listed in 1806.

== Career ==
Sarah Ann first appeared in Lloyd's Register (LR) in 1799 with J.Greves, master, J.Hunter, owner, and trade Liverpool–New Providence.

Sarah Ann sailed from Cork, Ireland, on 16 November 1799 for New Providence in the Bahamas. Lloyd's List (LL) reported on 2 May 1800 that as of 14 March 1800 she had not arrived at New Providence. It turned out that the French privateer corvette Berceau, of 14 guns and 100 men, had captured Sarah Ann on 21 January 1800. On 3 February 1800 the Antiguan privateer Peggy had recaptured Sarah Ann, Groves, master. Peggy had sent Sarah Ann into Antigua, where she was sold.

Sarah & Ann returned to the United Kingdom.

Year	Master	Owner	Trade	Source
1801	J.Greris; J.Richards	J.Hunter; Rowe	London–New Providence; Dublin–Liverpool	LR

== Fate ==
Sarah & Ann was last listed in 1806.
