= Sarah Ann (1811 ship) =

History

United States
- Name: Sarah Ann
- Owner: Dutton Williams, James Ramsey, Charles Malloy, & John Craig
- Builder: Saint Mary's County, Maryland
- Launched: 1811
- Commissioned: 27 July 1812
- Captured: 16 September 1812

General characteristics
- Tons burthen: 78 or 230 (bm)
- Length: 90 ft (27 m)
- Beam: 18 ft 10 in (5.7 m)
- Complement: 40, 44, or 50
- Armament: 1 × 9 or 12–pounder gun on a pivot

Sarah Ann was a United States privateer commissioned at Baltimore in 1812. She captured a British merchantman in a single-ship action before HMS Rhodian captured Sarah Ann on 16 September 1812.

== Prize taking ==
Captain Richard Moon sailed Sarah Ann on a cruise in August. She encountered the brig Elizabeth, Hanna, master, which was coming from Kingston, Jamaica, bound for London. Elizabeth was armed with ten 12-pounder carronades but she tried to escape. Sarah Ann chased Elizabeth for three hours before Sarah Ann was able to board her. Elizabeth struck after she had four men wounded; Sarah Ann had two men wounded. Sarah Ann took her prize into Savannah, Georgia, arriving there on 2 September. Elizabeth was carrying 323 hogsheads, and some tierces and barrels of sugar. She was also carrying 13 hogsheads and 37 tierces of coffee, and nine hogsheads and 29 barrels of ginger. Elizabeth was four years old. Lloyd's List (LL) reported that an American privateer had taken Elizabeth, Hannah, master, and taken her into Savannah. She was sold for US$65,883.10, though half of the proceeds went for duties and court costs. Sarah Ann had had two men wounded in the acton.

== Capture ==
Variable and the boats of Rhodian, Captain John George Boss, captured Sarah Ann, of one 12-pounder gun and 44 men, on 16 September 1812. The prize was sent into New Providence, The Bahamas, in October 1812. (Note: Some sources give the name of the captor as HMS Statira. However, Statira captured Sally Ann on 16 or 17 September 1812 and sent her into Halifax, Nova Scotia. Sally Ann, a schooner of 124 tons, J.Day, master, had been sailing from New London to St. Bartholomew with a cargo of flour, corn, and tobacco.)

== Prisoners ==
When Sarah Ann arrived at New Providence, six men of her crew, including Baltimorean George Roberts, were identified as possibly British subjects and were sent to Jamaica on Sappho for further investigation. Captain Moody wrote a letter attesting to the fact that the six were American citizens, five native born and one naturalized. Eventually Vice Admiral Charles Stirling, commander of the Royal Navy's Jamaica Station, had the men reclassified as prisoners of war, not British subjects. He had them transferred to a prison ship for eventual exchange for American prisoners.
