= Saba Island (United States Virgin Islands) =

Island in the United States Virgin Islands

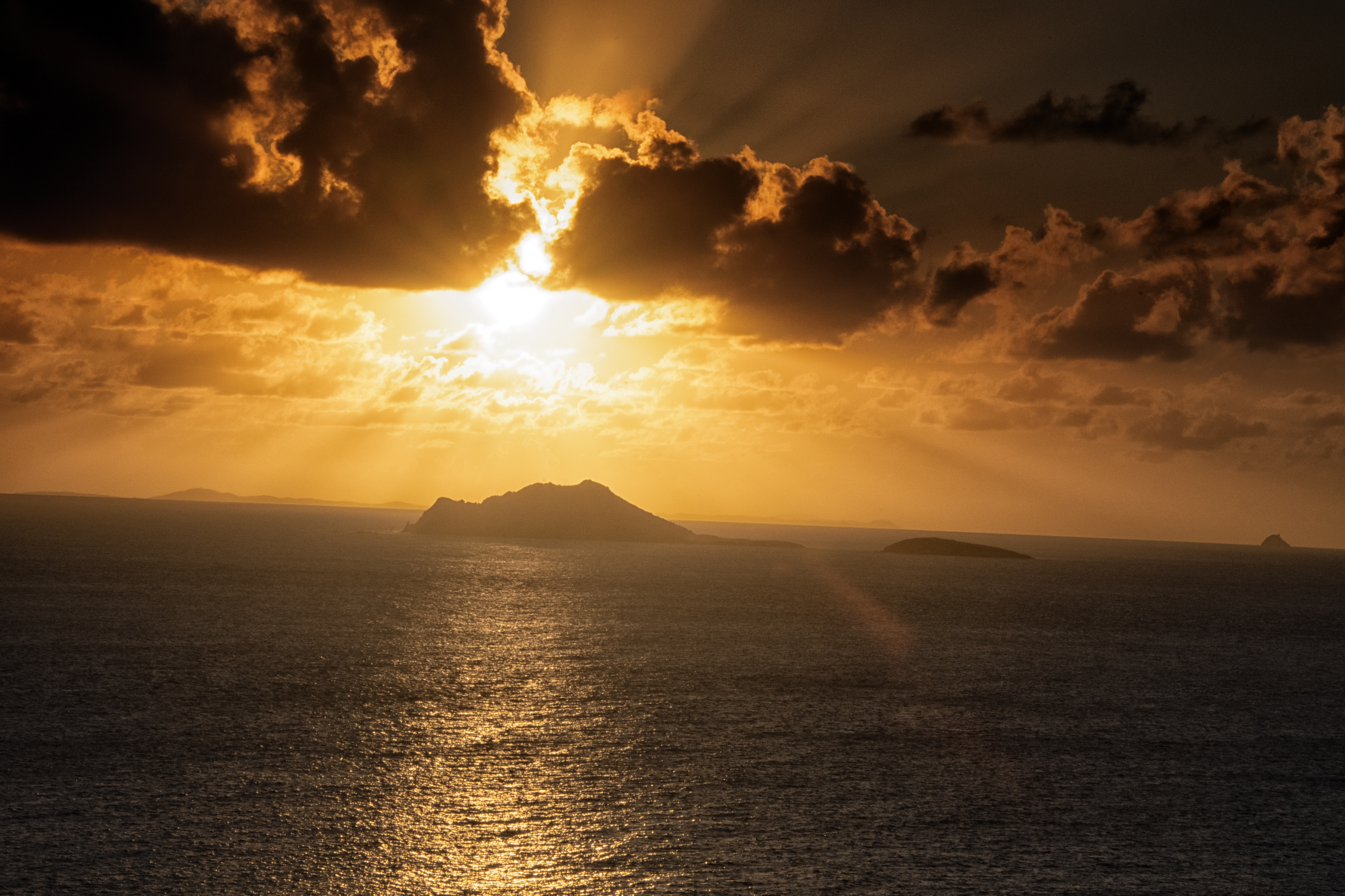
- Saba Island (left) and Turtledove Cay (right)

- Location in the Caribbean Saba Island (United States Virgin Islands) (the Caribbean)

Geography
- Location: Caribbean Sea
- Coordinates: 18°18′20″N 65°00′03″W

Administration
- United States; United States Virgin Islands
- Federal Department: U.S. Department of the Interior
- Federal Agency: U.S. Fish and Wildlife Service

Saba Island is a rocky Caribbean island in the United States Virgin Islands, situated three miles south of Cyril E. King Airport on St. Thomas and 2.6 miles west of Water Island. It is a steep, 200 feet high island with a sandy beach on the northern side. Turtledove Cay is connected by a shallow sandbar. Saba Island has salt ponds on both the eastern and western sides, which is popular bird observation posts, and has numerous rocky cliffs with sea birds on its southern shores. Besides for bird observation, the island is visited by scuba divers and snorkelers. In addition to coral reefs, the waters here are home to numerous ship wrecks, such as the Witshoal II, Witconcrete II, Grainton, and Witservice IV.

== Flora and fauna ==
The island has the archipelago's largest colonies of seabirds with more than 30,000 sooty terns. Other seabird species include bridled, sandwich, royal and roseate terns, brown noddies, laughing gulls, as well as red-billed and white-tailed tropicbirds. The island has been recognised as an Important Bird Area (IBA) by BirdLife International.
